= Monarchism in Brazil =

Political movement

The flag of the Empire of Brazil is widely used by Brazilian monarchists, sometimes modified to have 27 stars instead of 20.

The flag of the United Kingdom of Portugal, Brazil, and the Algarves

The political movements for the re-adoption of monarchy in Brazil has taken place as a series of uprisings and political acts, usually in a fragmented way and peripherally to larger causes. It has been fringe historically and remains a small movement to this day. It advocates restoration of the constitutional monarchy under the Brazilian imperial family, a cadet branch of the House of Braganza, which ruled Brazil for 72 years as the kingdom and later Empire of Brazil until the monarchy was abolished in 1889 by a military coup d'état that gave rise to the First Brazilian Republic.

== History ==
After the 1889 coup d'état that ended the imperial rule and established a republic in Brazil, the first monarchist nucleus began to form. Under the republican rule, they were a minority and initially even illegal. In 1890, the Brazilian Monarchical Directory was founded by Afonso Celso, the last Prime Minister of the Empire of Brazil in Rio de Janeiro. Its main objective was to organise the country's monarchists and to report directly with the exiled Brazilian Imperial Family. The institution was disestablished in 1921.

=== Monarchist uprisings ===
The Navy revolt (1893–1894) was a rebel movement promoted by units of the Brazilian Navy against the dictatorial government of Floriano Peixoto, supposedly supported by the monarchist opposition to the recent installation of the republic. It was part of the Federalist Revolution, led by the monarchist Gaspar da Silveira Martins, one of the last ministers of the Empire of Brazil, who was disaffected by Deodoro da Fonseca.

The Canudos War (1896–1897) was the confrontation between the Brazilian Army and the members of a popular movement of socio-religious background led by Antonio Conselheiro that lasted from 1896 to 1897, in the community of Canudos, Bahia. The great farmers of the region, joining the Church, formed a strong pressure group against the newly installed republic, asking that measures be taken against Antônio Conselheiro and his followers. Rumors were created that Canudos was armed to attack neighbouring towns and leave for the capital to depose the republican government and reinstall the monarchy.

A little known event was the Revolt of Ribeirãzinho (1902), a conservative movement that occurred in the city of Ribeirãozinho (now Taquaritinga), in São Paulo. Its fundamental objective was the restoration of the monarchy and the coronation of Prince Luiz of Orléans-Braganza, son of Isabel, Princess Imperial of Brazil. Unhappy with the First Brazilian Republic, the São Paulo monarchists had planned an uprising that was supposed to take place on 23 August 1902, and which was to topple then President Campos Sales. In fact, the uprising had only been carried out in Ribeirãozinho and Espírito Santo do Pinhal, a neighbouring town. This attempt to restore the monarchy lasted one day.

== Parties and organizations ==
=== Diretório Monárquico (1890–1921) ===
Monarchist Institution founded in 1890 by the Viscount of Ouro Preto, the last President of the Council of Ministers in Brazil. The institution was dissolved in 1921. On 25 November 2015, the Diretório Monárquico do Brasil was re-established by a group of monarchists, including jurist and writer Carlos Egert and Patrick Kouark. The organization maintains a presence on social media and participates in in-person activities, including marches and meetings of monarchist circles.

=== Pátria-Nova (1928–1937) ===
Founded in 1928, the Brazilian Imperial Patrianovist Action, or simply Patrianovism, was a monarchist organization present in several Brazilian states that expressed the nationalist and authoritarian ideas of the late 1920s and early 1930s. Idealised by Arlindo Veiga dos Santos, it aimed to establish a new monarchy in Brazil, based on a conservative political philosophy. The movement was linked to Prince Pedro Henrique of Orléans-Braganza, then Head of the Imperial House of Brazil and heir to the throne, as well as Plínio Salgado, leader and founder of the Brazilian Integralist Action. The organization was dissolved in 1937.

== Famous monarchists ==
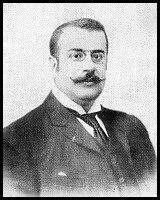
Eduardo Prado was a journalist and staunch monarchist who wrote, in 1893, A Ilusão Americana ("American Illusion"), criticising republicans and American imperialism. It was the first literary work to be censored by the newly established republic. Prado is the patron of the National Restorative Union (UNR), a counter-revolutionary and dissident monarchist movement in Brazil.

Many famous personalities in Brazil have declared themselves convicted monarchists.

Among the most famous names are Machado de Assis, Joaquim Nabuco, Baron of Rio Branco, André Rebouças, Viscount of Taunay, João Camilo de Oliveira Torres, Carlos de Laet and Count of Mota Maia.

Some monarchists, however, were victims of the republican regime. Among them is José da Costa Azevedo, the Baron of Ladario, who was shot by an unknown marksman for resisting an arrest warrant during 15 November, surviving only because a student, Carlos Vieira Ferreira, rescued him.

Another little known case is the murder of Colonel Gentil de Castro during the Canudos War. Owner of the monarchist newspapers Gazeta da Tarde and Gazeta da Liberdade, he was shot by unknown attackers in Rio de Janeiro.

A list of some notable monarchists by date of birth:

| Name | Political party | Occupation | Birth | Death |
|---|---|---|---|---|
| José Bonifácio de Andrada | None | Statesman | 1763 | 1838 |
| Maria Quitéria | None | Lieutenant | 1792 | 1853 |
| José Paranhos, Viscount of Rio Branco | Conservative Party | Politician | 1819 | 1880 |
| João Lustosa da Cunha Paranaguá, Marquis of Paranaguá | Liberal Party | Politician | 1821 | 1912 |
| Deodoro da Fonseca | None | Politician; marshal | 1827 | 1892 |
| José de Alencar | Conservative Party | Novelist; politician | 1829 | 1877 |
| Antônio Conselheiro | None | Religious leader | 1830 | 1897 |
| Antônio Carlos Gomes | None | Composer | 1836 | 1896 |
| Afonso Celso, Viscount of Ouro Preto | Liberal Party | Politician | 1836 | 1912 |
| André Rebouças | None | Engineer | 1838 | 1898 |
| Machado de Assis | None | Novelist | 1839 | 1908 |
| Joaquim Nabuco | None | Diplomat; politician | 1839 | 1910 |
| José Paranhos, Baron of Rio Branco | Conservative Party | Diplomat; politician | 1845 | 1912 |
| José do Patrocínio | None | Writer; politician | 1854 | 1905 |
| Arlindo Veiga dos Santos | AIPB | Writer, politician, poet | 1902 | 1978 |
| José Osvaldo de Meira Penna | None | Diplomat; writer | 1917 | 2017 |
| Ariano Suassuna | PSB | Playwright; writer | 1927 | 2014 |
| Prince Luiz of Orléans-Braganza | None | Activist | 1938 | 2022 |
| Prince Bertrand of Orléans-Braganza | None | Activist | born 1941 | |
| Olavo de Carvalho | None | Activist | 1947 | 2022 |
| Prince Luiz Philippe of Orléans-Braganza | Liberal Party (PL) | Politician; businessman | born 1969 | |
| Carla Zambelli | Liberal Party (PL) | Politician | born 1980 | |

== Present day ==
According to the Los Angeles Times, the level of support for a return of monarchy has remained fairly steady with 10.2% in the 1993 referendum and 10.7% in a 2017 survey by pollster Paraná Pesquisas.

Luiz Philippe of Orléans-Braganza, nephew of the current Head of the Vasourian pretenders to the Imperial House of Brazil, is known in the Brazilian academic environment. He is an active member of liberal movements in the country. In 2018, he was elected as a federal deputy for the state of São Paulo, representing the Social Liberal Party.

Politically, the movement is still small. In 2016, journalist Paulo Eduardo Martins, known for his monarchist positions, was elected federal deputy. The movement now hopes to raise public awareness of the issue and discuss the possibility of a new plebiscite similar to the one of 1993. In early 2017, a legislative idea was launched on the website of the Federal Senate to hold a referendum on the restoration of the monarchy in Brazil. Needing 20,000 votes in favour, it reached the mark of 32,000 votes and was converted into a legislative suggestion, already sent to the Commission of Human Rights of the Brazilian Federal Senate for debate, awaiting a rapporteur. On 10 August 2017, a state deputy from Minas Gerais sent a motion of support to the legislative suggestion to the President of the Senate through the Legislative Assembly of Minas Gerais, although this motion was not subject to a vote by the full membership of the assembly. On 14 November 2017, the state of Rondônia did the same by sending a motion to support the referendum proposal for the restoration of the monarchy to the federal senate through its legislative assembly.

== National "Bandeiraço" of the Independence ==
In 2015, some Brazilian monarchists started appearing with Brazil's imperial flag in military parades and similar events during Independence Day, an act known as the National "Bandeiraço" of Independence (bandeiraço may be translated as "great flag demonstration"). In 2016, the act was carried out nationally, in 16 cities. In 2017, 34 cities participated.

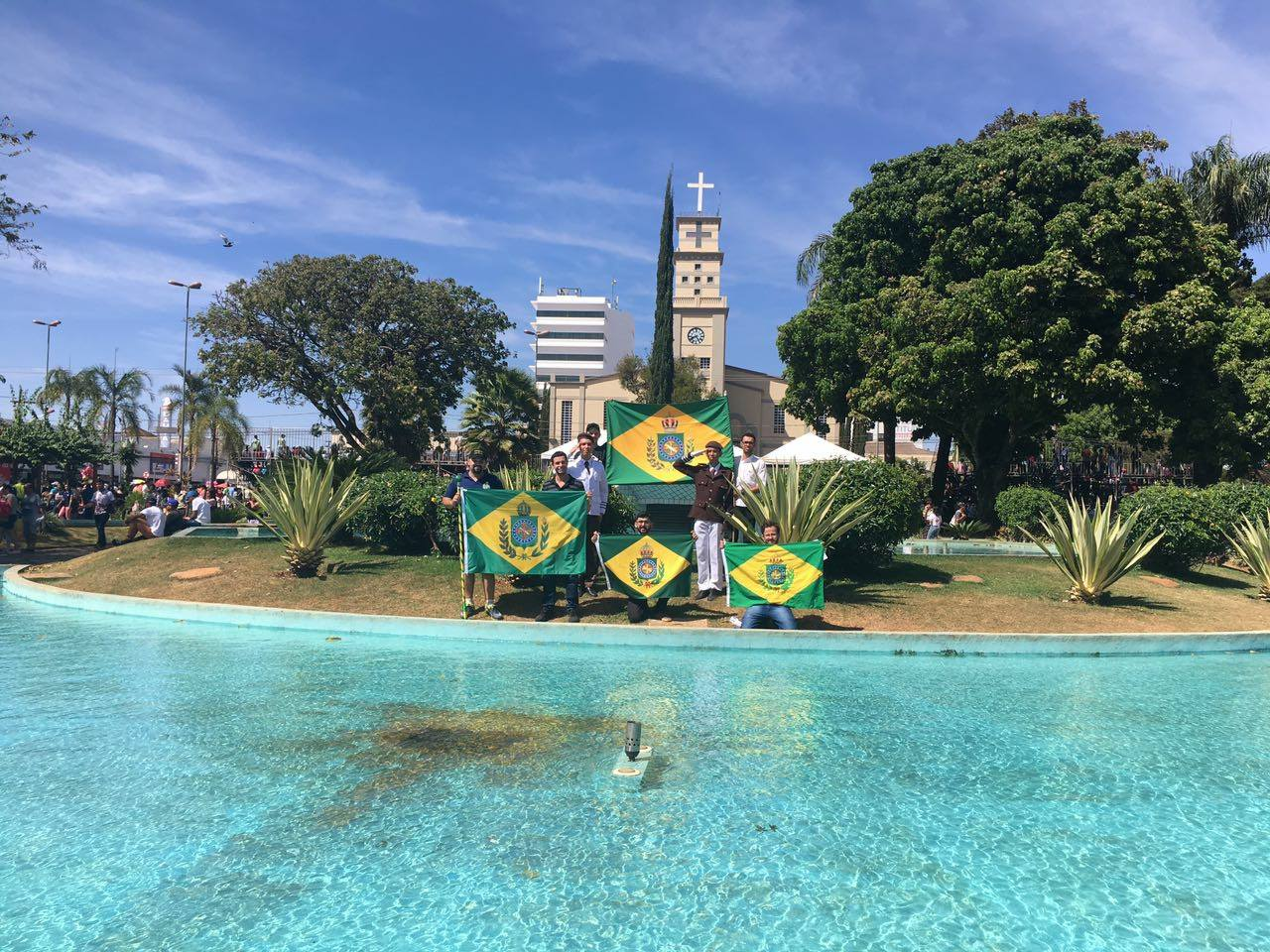
National "Bandeiraço" of the Independence in Anápolis, Goiás, in 7 September 2017.

== Pretenders ==
The most recognised pretender to the Brazilian throne is Prince Bertrand of Orléans-Braganza. He is the head of the called Vassouras branch of the Imperial Family, since it was divided after the resignation of his great-uncle Pedro de Alcântara, Prince of Grão-Pará in 1908. The descendants of Prince Pedro de Alcântara did not accept his resignation and maintained an active claim to the throne until the death of his elder son, Prince Pedro Gastão of Orléans-Braganza in 2007, whose claim passed to his son, Prince Pedro Carlos of Orléans-Braganza, head of the Petrópolis branch.

== Public opinion ==
There is no official research on public opinion regarding which form of government is preferred in Brazil. However, the emergence and growth of monarchist activity and organisations throughout the country is visible, especially in anti-government protests. Currently, according to an online poll conducted on the Brazilian Senate's website, 92.8% of the participants expressed support for a referendum on the restoration of the monarchy as a constitutional monarchy. This legislative suggestion has been terminally rejected by the legislative committee responsible for appraising it.

| Date | Polling organisation | Question | Yes | No | No answer | Ref |
|---|---|---|---|---|---|---|
| 4 June 2018 | "O Tempo" (Newspaper from Minas Gerais) | "Do you support the restoration of the monarchy in Brazil?" | 78% | 22% | — | |
| 23 June 2017 | Paraná Research Institute | "Would you be for or against the return of the Monarchy in Brazil, or rather, going back to having a King/Queen or an Emperor/Empress?" | 10.7% | 84.5% | 4.8% | |
| 22 June 2017 | "Senado Federal" (Official Brazilian senate website) | "Do you support the legislative suggestion to restore constitutional monarchy?" | 92.8% | 7.2% | — | |
| 21 April 2013 | "Portal Terra" (Newspaper) | "From the same ticket used in 1993, you can vote for this virtual plebiscite. Which system of government do you choose?" | 82% | 18% | — | |
| 21 April 1993 | "Federal Government of Brazil" (Federal Law n° 8.624) | "Constitutional Referendum about the Government regime and system" | 10.2% | 66% | 23.8% | |
