= Diretório Monárquico do Brasil =

Monarchical institution

Brazilian Monarchical Directory Diretório Monárquico do Brasil
- 1890–c. 1921
- Flag (1853–1889) Coat of arms of Ouro Preto

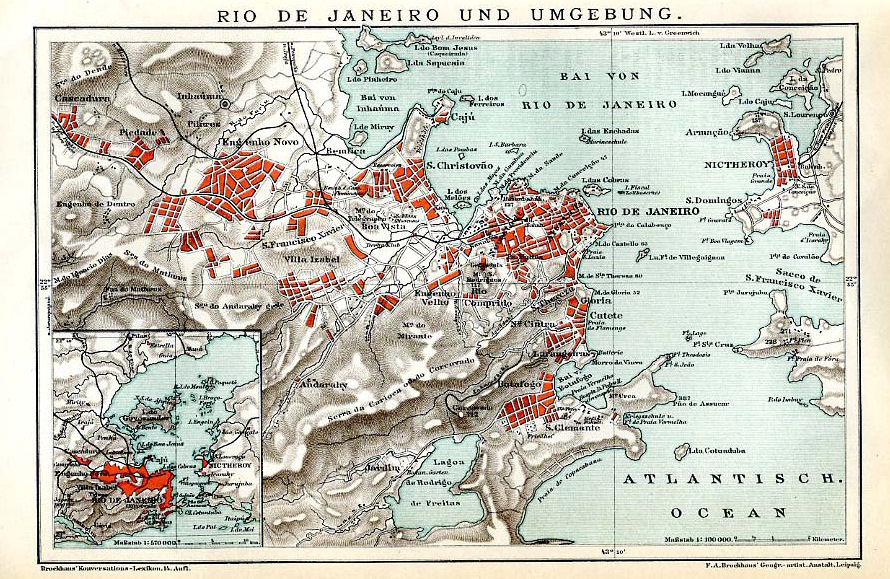
- Neutral Municipality
- Seat: Eu, Seine-Maritime, France (the imperial family); Rio de Janeiro (directory political members)
- Government: Constitutional monarchy in exile
  - Empress: Isabel I
  - President-general: The Viscount of Ouro Preto (1890–1912); The Count Afonso Celso (1912–1921)
- History
  - Ouro Preto appointed Prime Minister: 7 June 1889
  - Republican coup d'état: 15 November 1889 1890
  - Directory established: 7 April 1890
  - Second navy revolt: 17 September 1893
  - Prince Pedro's renunciation: 30 October 1908
  - Disestablished: c. 1921
Preceded by
Empire of Brazil

Diretório Monárquico do Brasil (English: Brazilian Monarchical Directory) was a monarchical institution established in Rio de Janeiro in 1890, one year after the proclamation of the republic, by Afonso Celso, Viscount of Ouro Preto, the last Prime Minister of the Empire of Brazil, entrusted by the former Princess Regent Isabel, to whom they considered Empress of Brazil after the death of her father Pedro II, in 1891, to organize the actions of Brazilian monarchists. The organization was constituted as an unofficial representation of the deposed heiress to the throne of Brazil and also functioned as a council.

During its existence, the Monarchic Directory started as an illegal institution until the beginning of the civil republican government, acting throughout the country through a network composed of nobles, members of civil society and intellectuals and former loyalist politicians of the empire such as the also former Prime Minister João Alfredo Correia de Oliveira, actively trying to manipulate and influence Brazilian political life. Although not considered a parallel government, the Monarchic Directory reported and acted in accordance with the exiled imperial family, acted in accordance with the laws of the empire's constitution of 1824 and was responsible for the monarchist acts present in various events in Brazilian history, such as in the resignation of Deodoro da Fonseca and in the Revolta da Armada. It was also in the institution's headquarters that Pedro de Alcântara, Prince of Grão-Pará, son of Isabel, signed his official resignation, which was issued by the directory itself.

With old age and Isabel's increasing distance during and after the First World War, the directory was informally dissolved with the end of its political activities, eventually leading to the formation of other monarchist organizations, these without official sponsorship of the Imperial Family such as the Brazilian Patrianovist Imperial Action.

== History ==
=== Foundation Manifesto ===
In 1890, the Viscount of Ouro Preto issued the manifesto that created the directory:

"The Brazilian republic, as it was proclaimed, is a coup, a work of iniquity. The republic has risen on the bucklers of the mutinous soldiery, comes from a criminal origin, was carried out by means of an attack unprecedented in history and shall have an ephemeral existence!"

=== Action on Prince Pedro's resignation ===
In 1908, when Prince Pedro de Alcântara signed his instrument of resignation, supposedly under pressure from his mother, to marry a Bohemian noblewoman, his mother Isabel, in the capacity of Head of the Imperial House of Brazil and recognized by the Monarchic Directory as Empress of Brazil, hastened to communicate the fact to them, sending it, in a letter of November 9, 1908, one of three copies of the resignation document.

The Monarchic Directory was the body entrusted by the Head of the Imperial House to guide the actions of the monarchists in Brazil. Established in 1890, as a sort of unofficial representation of the heir to the abolished throne for political purposes, it was also, to a certain extent, an advisory body that the former Princess Regente Isabel used to listen to when it came to Brazilian affairs. With only the powers delegated by the Head of the Imperial House, did not formally constitute a government-in-exile, but functioned as a continuing representation of the monarchy. In such a way, it was not up to the Monarchic Directory to accept or refuse the actions of the Head of the House, only to observe, advise, and make them public in Brazilian territory, always working with observance to the government to advance the cause of monarchical restoration politically.

== Composition ==
The Monarchic Directory had representations in all states of Brazil at the time, and its nucleus was composed of former Empire politicians such as former Prime Ministers, ministers, senators, nobles, journalists, abolitionists and members of the intellectuals of the time. Stand out the ex-prime ministers Viscount of Ouro Preto, João Alfredo Correia de Oliveira and Lafayette Rodrigues Pereira, Carlos de Laet, Domingos de Andrade Figueira, Amador da Cunha Bueno, among others.

== Bibliography ==
- Marson, Izabel Andrade (2009). Da "restauração" da monarquia à "conciliação" com a república: diálogo entre textos, escolhas políticas de Nabuco e episódios da primeira década republicana (PDF) (in Portuguese). Fortaleza: ANPUH. Archived from the original (PDF) on 2017-03-13.
- Causa Imperial: http://causaimperial.com.br/822/
- Barman, Roderick J. (2002). Princess Isabel of Brazil: gender and power in the nineteenth century. Wilmington, Delaware: Scholarly Resources. ISBN 0-8420-2846-3.
- Carvalho, José Murilo de (2007). D. Pedro II: ser ou não ser (in Portuguese). São Paulo: Companhia das Letras. ISBN 978-85-359-0969-2.
