= Patrianovism =

Brazilian Imperial Patrianoist Action Ação Imperial Patrianovista Brasileira
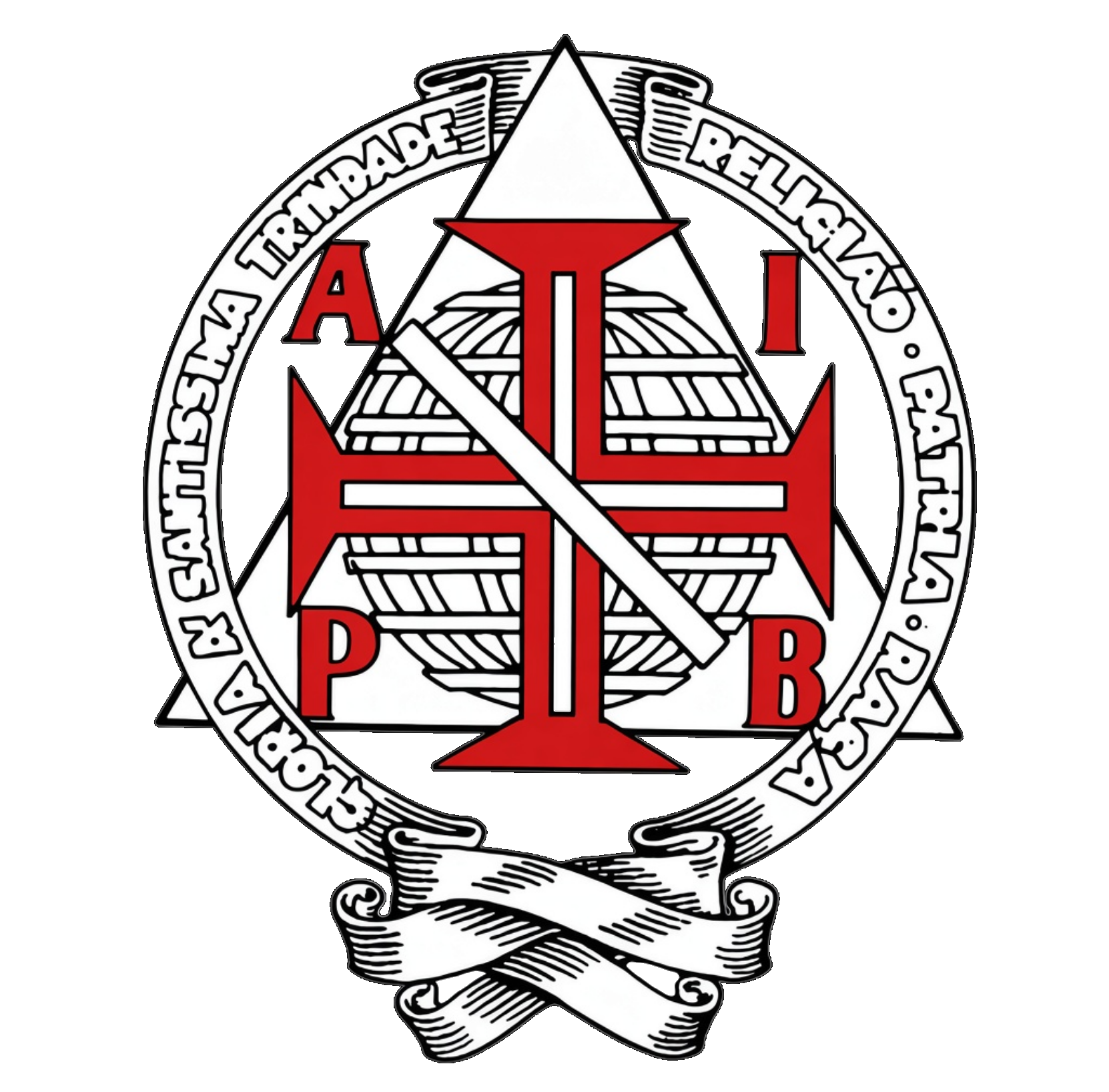
- Abbreviation: AIPB
- President: Arlindo Veiga dos Santos (1932–1934); Arlindo Veiga dos Santos (1936–1937)
- Founder: Arlindo Veiga dos Santos
- Founded: March 3, 1928; 98 years ago
- Dissolved: November 10, 1937; 88 years ago
- Preceded by: CMCSP Pátria Nova; Diretório Monárquico do Brasil
- Headquarters: São Paulo, Estados do Unidos Brasil
- Newspaper: Monarquia, Pátria-Nova
- Women's wing: Departamento Nacional Feminino
- Paramilitary: Guarda Imperial Patrianovista
- Membership: 250,000 (1937 est.)
- Ideology: Patrianovism: Monarchism; Anti-communism; Anti-liberalism; Municipalism; Corporatism; Integral nationalism
- Political position: Far-right
- Religion: Roman Catholicism
- Slogan: Sem Rei não há União Nacional ("With no King there is no National Unity")
- Anthem: "Marcha dos Camisas Brancas"

Party flag
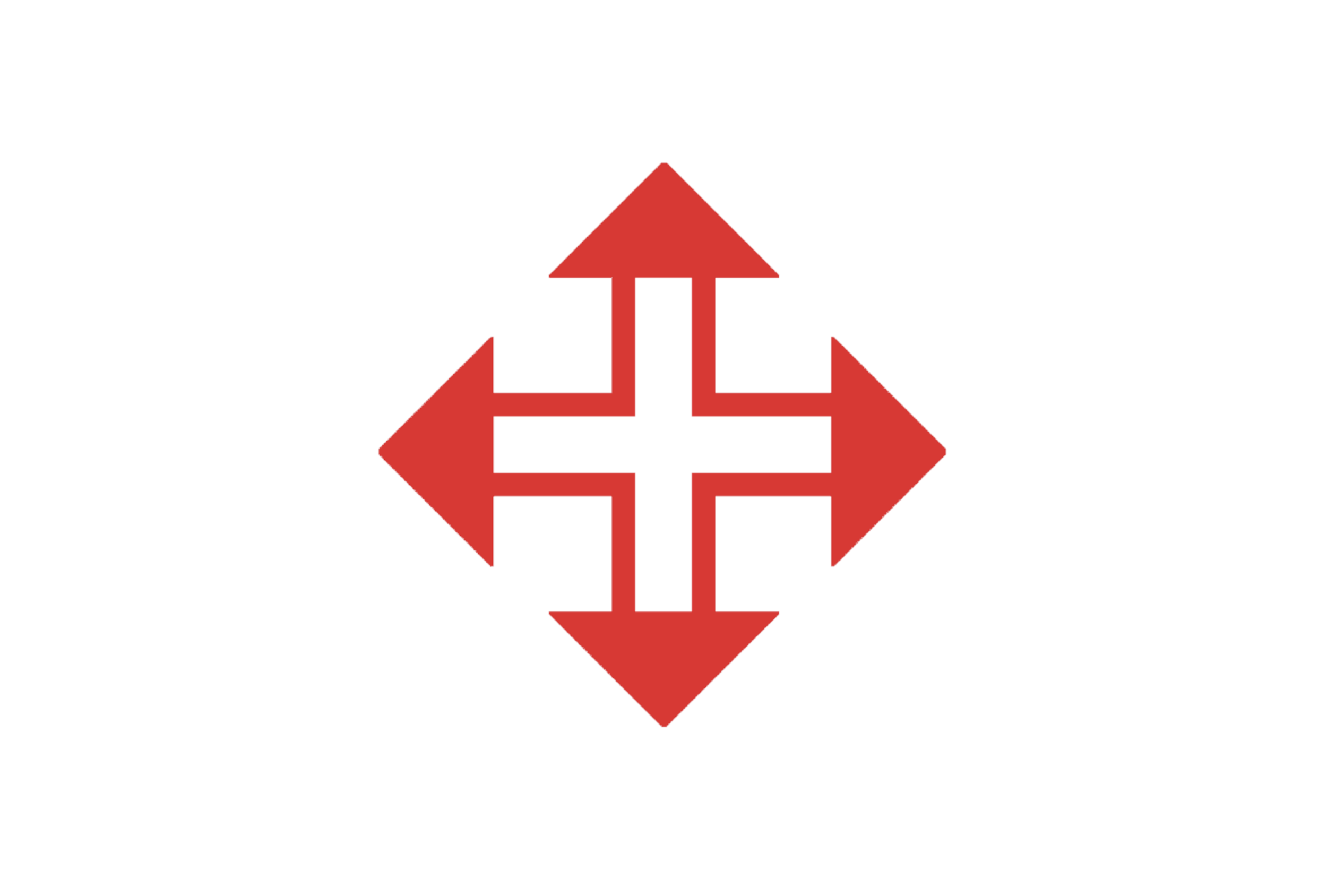

The Brazilian Patrianovist Imperial Action (Ação Imperial Patrianovista Brasileira, AIPB), Pátria-Nova, or simply Patrianovism, was a monarchist organization that was present in many Brazilian states and that expressed the nationalist ideals of the 1920s and 1930s. Idealized by Arlindo Veiga dos Santos, it sought to establish a new organic monarchy in Brazil based on traditionalist policies, unlike what the now-defunct Empire of Brazil, which the patrianovists saw as liberal.

Patrianovism is considered to be the pioneer of the ultra-right movement in Brazil, being the most expressive prior to the existence of the Brazilian Integralist Action (AIB). Even though they are considered the most relevant monarchist organization of the First Brazilian Republic, the party never managed to rally the masses to join their ranks, making it a vanguardist movement composed mostly of the middle-class. Some journalists claimed that patrianovism was just another movement portrayed as the new trend.

== Etymology ==
The term Pátria-Nova (New Fatherland) originated from Portuguese integralism, which sought to create a "New Portugal" by recovering the many medieval institutions and adapting them to the modern age. This ideology supported the establishment of an organic, traditionalist, and anti-parliament monarchy based on Catholic, nationalistic and anti-liberal ideals. Such ideas were aligned with the Brazilians who sought to establish a similar form of government. Thus, In Brazil, Pátria-Nova became synonymous with searching for a new fatherland with its basis in tradition.

== History ==
The dawn of the 20th century raised opposition to liberalism, democracy and republicanism, not only in Brazil but also in Portugal and most of the world, in the form of fascism. This line of thought strengthened radical monarchism in those two countries, during the rise of the First Brazilian Republic and before the First Portuguese Republic.

The Catholic Church also poised itself to stand against Socialism and promote a "spiritual revolution" in Brazil. For this reason, Jackson Figueiredo established the Centro Dom Vital in 1922. The vitalistas based their line of thought from the Catholic social teaching and integralist movements, like the Action Française and Lusitanian Integralism.

These events led to a rise in Traditional Monarchism which is different from other monarchist movements and groups like the Diretório Monárquico do Brasil or the Monarchist Party of São Paulo.

=== First phase (1928–1937) ===
In 1928, a group of young Catholic intellectuals from the Brazilian middle class, mostly from the University of São Paulo and from the Marian Congress of Saint Ifigênea, following the lead of Arlindo Veiga dos Santos, a black poet, founded the Monarchist Center of Social Culture and New-Fatherland Politics (CMCSP Pátria Nova), which sought to study national problems, uniting the ideas of corporatism to anti-liberal monarchism. This centre was the first group in Brazil to have a fascist-leaning outlook.

In 1932, after a period in which the monarchists grouped together with what would become the Brazilian Integralist Action, Pátria-Nova would then become the Ação Imperial Patrianovista Brasileira, a separate organization. At this point, the patrianovists already had elaborated their policies, to promote the instauration of an Organic Empire, with an emphasis on taking a different governmental approach to what the Brazilian Empire had taken, and also had established centres for the propagation of such ideals in almost all Brazilian provinces, founding more than 200 centres for meetings and studies as of 1935, ranging from the Brazilian South to the Amazon, with notable examples such as the Centro de Cultura Social Dom Henrique in the state of Pernambuco.

In 1934, Veiga resigned from his post as the president of the AIPB, alleging particular motivations. The reason why he left his post is unclear, but it could have been either due to indiscipline or disrespect for authority. Some historians speculate that he decided to leave his post because other high-ranking Patrianovists were racist. While he was away, Patrianovism still was running somewhat normally, performing celebrations and events, such as the celebration of Dom Pedro Henrique, the then pretender to the Brazilian throne. Nonetheless, he re-assumed the position of president in 1936.

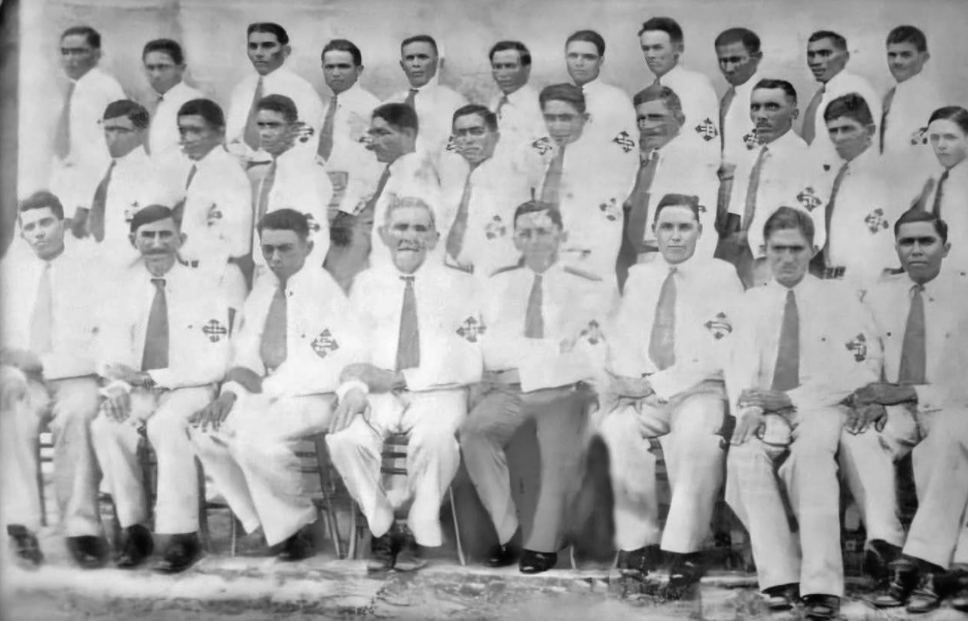
'Whiteshirts' in the 30s

Patrianovism persisted in Brazilian politics, expanding to more than fifteen states, being predominant in the south of Brazil, where pátria-nova competed with the integralists, especially in areas of Germanic heritage, appealing to such demographic by exposing Dom Pedro Henrique of Orléans-Braganza as a true German, as many of the Brazilian House of Bragança had married German nobility. Patrianovism expanded irregularly, due to communication hardships, personalist leaders, faulty propaganda and scarce funds. The consequence of such a situation is the empty state the AIPB was left in 1936. The situation remained the same until President Getúlio Vargas prohibited the existence of all political organizations with his proclamation of the Estado Novo in 1937. The patrianovists applauded the measures taken by the new regime and identified themselves with it.

=== Second phase (1945–1978) ===
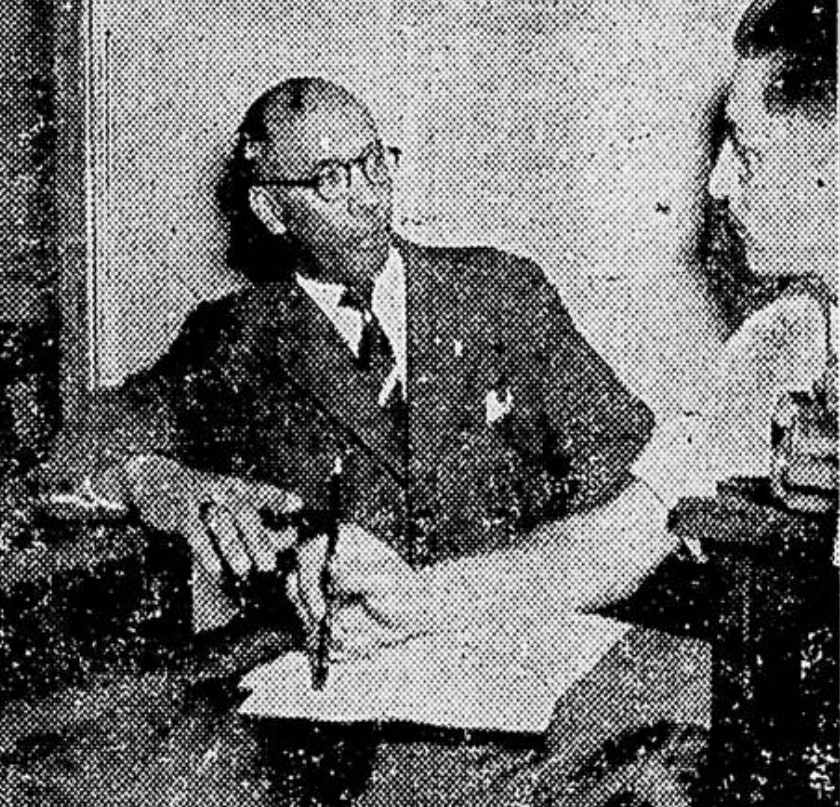
Arlindo Veiga dos Santos promoting Patrianovism in 1949

The Patrianovists resurfaced in 1945, after the end of Vargas' rule, but the group was almost empty. When parties became legal again, the Political Police started to follow dos Santos on the basis that he was an Integralist. He was never able to reproduce the capability of mobilization Patrianovism witnessed in its first phase. The organization was only formally reactivated in 1955, under the name AIPB.

In 1964, military and civilian forces organized a coup d'état. The Patrianovists were yet again supporters of the new regime, as they were part of the conspiring forces. In the following years, political liberties were weakened by the new dictatorial government. Patrianovism was also affected as the movement progressively crumbled. In 1978, Arlindo Veiga dos Santos died, after persisting in the political exclusion he found himself in.

The Historian Teresa Malatian, who kickstarted the study on patrianovism in 1981, noted that "There were no archives, nor bibliographies, nor documentation" when she began her studies, only managing to do so by a chance encounter with someone who knew a patrianovist. This showcases how small the movement was, even though it was in a part of Brazilian history, the biggest ultra-right organization.

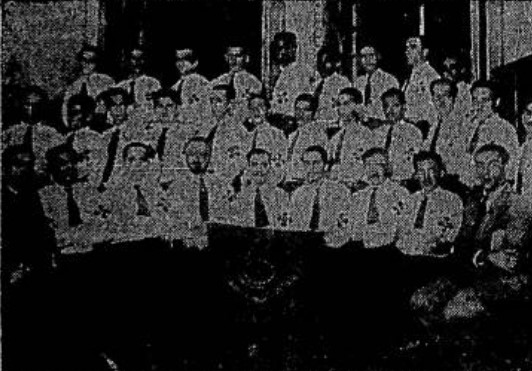
Members of the GUIP

== Paramilitary ==
In 1932, the paramilitary group Guarda Imperial Patrianovista (GUIP), called the camisas brancas ("white shirts") and who bore the patrianovist red arrow cross, meaning the "union of the cross of Christ and the arrows of the indians", on their left arm, was formed to "defend a Christian Brazil against the attacks of communism" and prepare the country for the establishment of the third Empire. Patrianovists thought of themselves as "mythical warriors of Christianity".

== Ideology ==
Patrianovism is rooted in Catholicism, the political teachings of Saint Thomas Aquinas, nationalism, and the rejection of liberalism and a constitution. It thus criticizes not only the process of Brazilian independence, from the perspective that the country had achieved independence in 1815 – when Brazil was elevated to the status of constituent kingdom of the United Kingdom of Portugal, Brazil and Algarves – but also those seeking to restore the empire with the 1824 Brazilian Constitution. They argued that there were more self-ruling liberties for municipalities than after the "separation".

For Patrianovists, when a monarch signs a constitution, no matter the circumstances that they were in, they become subject to those who were once their vassals. The AIPB argued that the notion of the absolute king being a despot is false and that liberalism is the true despotic government since despotism is when the one or the many in power do not recognize any other principle except their own will.

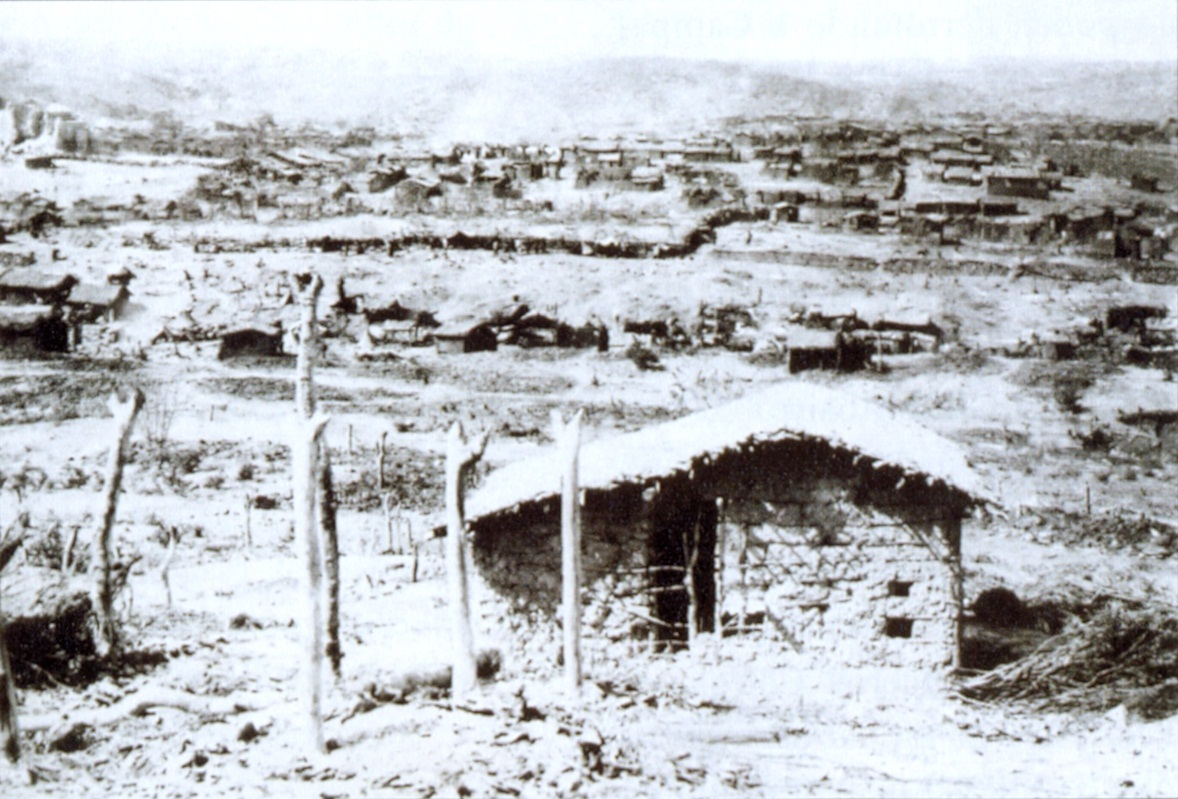
Canudos was the town where an anti-republican movement spawned in Brazil in 1896. The townsfolk organized themselves in what could be categorized as municipalism.

=== Eight points ===
The eight points made in the party's newspaper Pátria Nova in 1929 were the following:

1. Creed – Roman Catholicism should be made mandatory in every institution;
2. Monarchy – A responsible monarch should be able to rule and govern freely. The monarchy is the basis for syndicalist municipalism;
3. Brazilian fatherland and race – Affirmation of the Brazilian people in every stance: religiously, physically and economically;
4. New method of administrative division – Brazil should be divided into smaller provinces and regions, solely for administrative reasons, to prevent regionalism and consecutively separatism;
5. Syndicalist organization – Both spiritual and economical productions should be organized in syndicates.
6. Imperial capital at the center/heart of the Empire;
7. Foreign relations based on Christianity;
8. Special agreement relationship with Ibero-America.

=== Manifesto ===
We are Pátria-Nova, radical and violent extreme Right, affirmers of God and His Church, affirmers of the Imperial, Catholic Nation, irreconcilable and intolerant enemies of bourgeoisism, plutocratism and the materialist, atheist, mocking, exploitative, internationalist, Judaizer and Freemasonic capitalism; enemies of the republic, of the parties, of parliamentarism, in short, of religious, political and economic liberalism; that is, also as enemies of the Bolshevik anarchy that with equally big mistakes intend, in vain, to "correct" the tyranny of liberal bourgeoisie, as enemies of the lying social order, installed virtually all over the world.

=== Corporatism ===
The movement was adept of corporatism as the ideal political, social and economic form of organization. The central reason for the support of corporatism was the discredit of the liberal and secular republic, fueled by the economic collapse the world suffered in 1929 and the patrianovists' religiousness. Paim Vieira claimed that corporatism is simply "the instrument of the Christian spirit" and it can't work without religion. For Afro-Brazilian patrianovists, such as the party leader, corporatism was the way out of social exclusion.

=== Anti-democracy ===
It rejected the participation of the masses and political parties, as did the AIB, in politics since:

- The power is exclusive to the monarch;
- The masses themselves were in favour of a form of government led by a powerful figure (such as a King or a General) instead of politicians who were apathetic to their well-being;
- Different political parties would lead to the polarization and the separation of the population;
- They transform public goods into private property;
- They work against the cooperation of municipalities;
- The various political factions worked against national unity.

Patrianovism also accuses the various political parties of being the same conglomeration, but only with a different name to disguise themselves. They also accused parties of having predatory manners and of trying to take the reins, with the intent of striking the Traditional Order, seeking the benefit of becoming an organization with no accountability to the nation. Reinforcing their anti-partisanship view, patrianovists expressed disinterest, in the results of presidential elections in Brazil, and discontentment in the compulsory voting laws.

That, however, did not stop the AIPB from participating in the Elections of 1935.

=== Anti-Republicanism ===
For Patrianovists, the Democratic Partisanship Republic goes in the complete opposite direction of municipalism, proposed as the state where the community esteem each other, works for each other and conspire for the greater good. They also expressed that this form of government, much like the "anti-Luso action of the 1820s", is a barbarian-imported political scheme, "...an idea of Brazilians, but never a Brazilian idea...", similar to a tyrannical invader, damaging traditional and sacred institutions of a genuine Brazil. For them, the Republic is the eternal restart in that the republican government always has a setback, never learning to grow. Meanwhile, in the monarchical government, there exists a linear growth towards prosperity. The republican form of government – demoralized, disorganized and improvident – would also be the nest for caudillos, dictators and tyrants, whereas the monarchical form of government would be the best suited to preserve order and liberty. Arlindo characterized the republic as an oppressive, bureaucratic, incompetent, unpious, immoral and demoralized form of government, and while Brazil is under such regimen, it will be in a status of an occupied and explored country.

=== Traditionalism ===
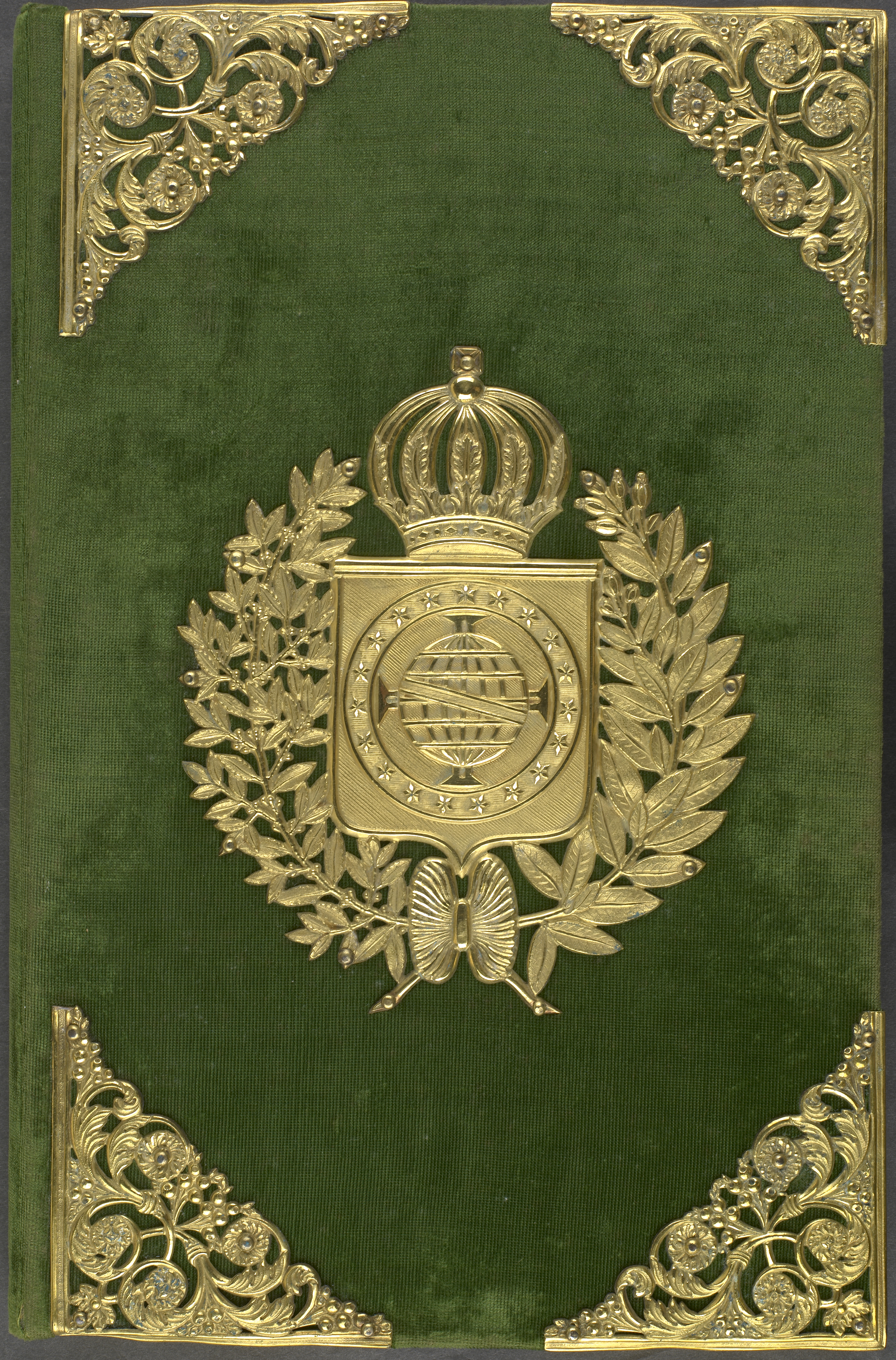
The Constitution of the Brazilian Empire is considered to be one of the most liberal constitution of its times.

Patrianovism considers that every true politic is centred on traditionalism, the basis for genuine progress, responsible for the continuance of the country's identity. A recurrent line of thought in Patrianovism is the nostalgia for the past, not for the Empire, but pre-independence Brazil, where – they believed – all of the great things such as honour, dignity, greatness etc. were left. The position the Church held in the past was also attractive to the patrianovists. The period from 1822 to 1889 was considered by the patrianovists one of "accidentals mistakes", such as the form of government of the empire. They claim that Pedro II's reign did not take advantage the catholic and monarchic roots of the Brazilian identity and had major social-political and religious errors.

However, in the present, that is, the time after the military republican coup of 1889, the country was left morally and economically in ruins, with the decline of national identity. The solution for all of the problems in the present, would then be supposedly solved by the past. Patrianovists feared that if they returned to the liberal Monarchy, the outcome would be another coup, that could install socialism or communism in Brazil.

Unlike other third-position movements, like Fascism, patrianovism was a reactionary movement, not a revolutionary one. That meant that the group yearned for a return to the agrarian economic state rather than proceed with the industrialization of the nation.

=== Rejection of internal and external capitalism ===
In many speeches, Jews mostly took the blame for the ailments of the Brazilian blacks, being described as capitalist explorers always associated with the international bourgeoisie, finances, usury and the embodiment of "alien" interests. The Freemasons were often put alongside the Semites, evoking the Judeo-Freemason plot.

The AIPB also viewed monarchism as a way to stand against International exploration of Brazil. Then Secretary of the AIPB, Sebastião Pagano, wrote that the "Imperial Brazilians" want a monarchy because they need to "stand strong against exploration" because Brazil is poor and the "Monarchy is the best economic system".

=== Immigration and Racial problems ===
Corresponding to the beliefs that the Republic was "anti-national", the movement had discontentment with the branqueamento policy, that promoted immigration to Brazil from various European countries, specially from Italy and other Mediterranean nations, and from Japan. The Patrianovists believed that those immigrants were stealing away the jobs from native Brazilians, standing, for example, against the establishment of a Japanese company in the Amazon.

Coupled with branqueamento, Arlindo blamed the Republic for the bad quality of life Afro-Brazilians had.

According to researcher Ramatis Jacino, the AIPB was, perhaps, the most significant representant of black conservatism in Brazilian history.

== Party relationships ==
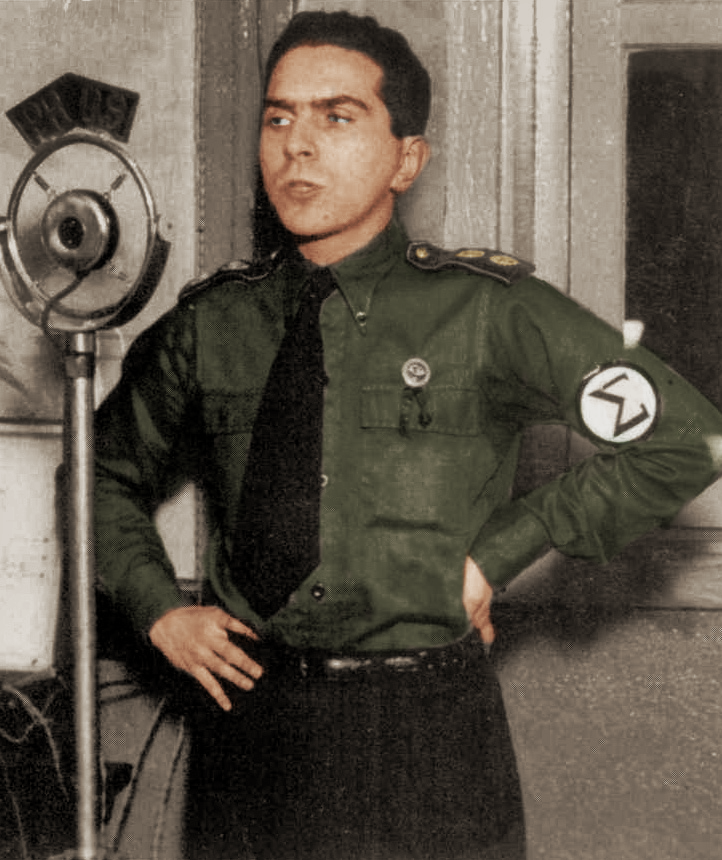
Miguel Reale was the one who published the book which led to the divide.

=== Brazilian Integralist Action ===
There were a lot of similarities between the AIPB and the AIB, as the Patrianovist political discourse appointed Brazilian Integralism as complementary to Patrianovism. Plínio Salgado, the most important Integralist figure in Brazil, used to exchange letters with Veiga, trying to get the later to support Integralism.

In 1932, Arlindo Veiga dos Santos, the president of the party, co-founded the Secretary of Political Study, alongside Plínio. A handful of Patrianovists joined the organization, which would end up becoming the Brazilian Integralist Action (AIB). The Patrianovists left the group in the second semester, after it was made clear in the book "A posição do Integralismo" (Integralism's Alignment) that the best model of government for the Integralists would be a "Social Republic" in virtue of the loyalty of the integralists to republicanism.

[With the Integral State] The Federative Republican system must be maintained [...] We affirm our Republican ideology

— Miguel Reale, Integralism's Alignment

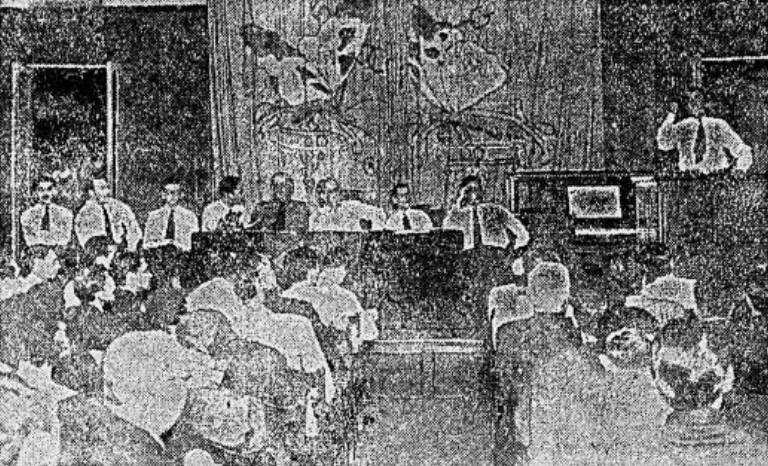
Integralist leader Gustavo Barroso seated with Patrianovists for the birthday of Pedro Henrique of Orléans-Braganza

In the first periods of the AIB, Plínio was tempted to blame the Patrianovists in any eventual ailment of Integralism, for not joining them. However, when the AIB became a movement of the masses, which was never possible for the AIPB, he gave it up. With such turntables, several Patrianovists decided to leave the ranks of the AIPB to join their ideological cousins.

One of the leaders of the patrianovist movement, Sebastião Pagano, proclaimed to the newspaper Diário de Notícia, that the reason behind the success of the integralist movement was due to the effort of patrianovism since 1928.

Even though both groups were not in the same political group, the relationship between them was very friendly. Monarchists had no problem in joining with the integralists, considering Brazilian integralism as a complement to organic monarchism. The leaders of the integralist movement, Plínio Salgado and Gustavo Barroso had monarchist sentiments. According to Barroso, "Patrianovism is monarchist because it is integralist".

=== Brazilian Black Front ===
Both organizations were founded by Arlindo Veiga dos Santos, who was himself a black Brazilian. Created in 1931, the Frente Negra Brasileira materialized the fight for the "Social and Political Union of the National Black People". Veiga wished to raise support for the monarchist cause in the black masses, turning FNB into another center for Patrianovist ideals, trying to merge black politics with Patrianovism.

But even with that effort, Francisco Lucrécio, a former director of the FNB, noted that although the black community understood the ideals of nationalism, they never really managed to comprehend Patrianovism.

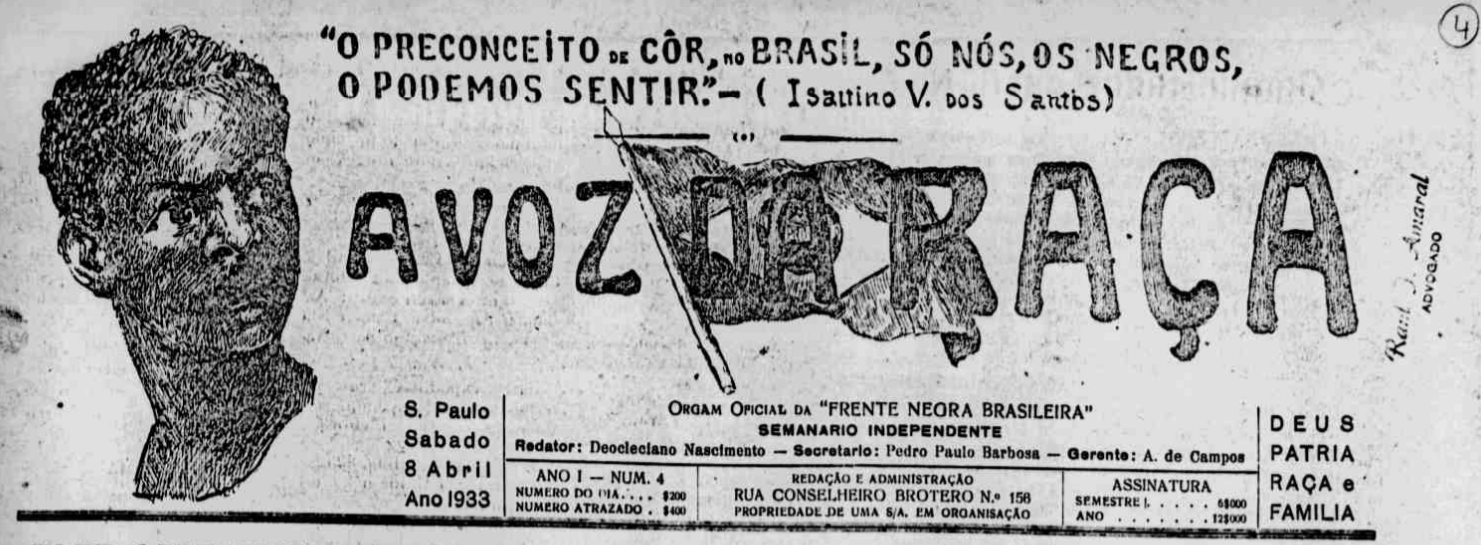
FNB's official newspaper. Above is a quote from Arlindo's brother: "Only we, the blacks, can feel the racial prejudice in Brazil".

Even though Arlindo had this setback, it is noticeable that the two groups had much in common. Both organizations supported:

- Exacerbated nationalism;
- Defence of Brazilian traditions;
- Extreme rejection of communism;
- Attacks against democracy and liberalism.

The cooperation between the groups went even further. Isaltino Veiga dos Santos, Arlindo's brother, and Salatiel Campos, both Patrianovists, were active in various activities of the FNB. It is also notable that both organizations used to share the same building for meetings. They both used paramilitary groups, with the highlight of a segment of the FNB militia being of black practitioners of capoeira, akin to the Black Guard, that fought against republicans after slavery was abolished in the Brazilian Empire.

=== Integralismo Lusitano ===
The two organisations, Integralismo Lusitano ("Lusitanian Integralism") and the AIPB, considered each other to be their counterpart in across the ocean.Such argument was made because they both:

- Were Integral-Christians;
- Had the same Luso-Brazilian background;
- Supported corporatism as the ideal form of political, social and economical government organization;
- Supported an Organic Monarchy;
- Held the belief that Constitutional monarchies and Liberal Republics will bring the same problems.

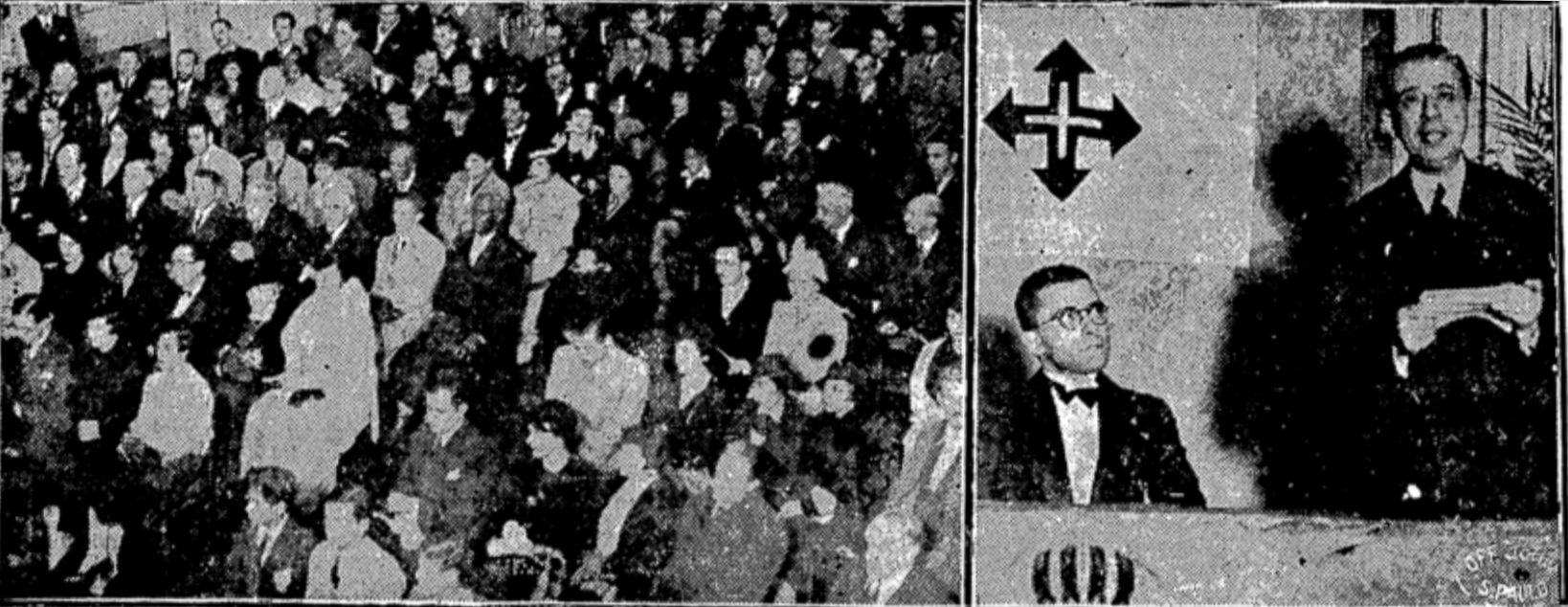
Solemnity for the birthday of D. Pedro Henrique

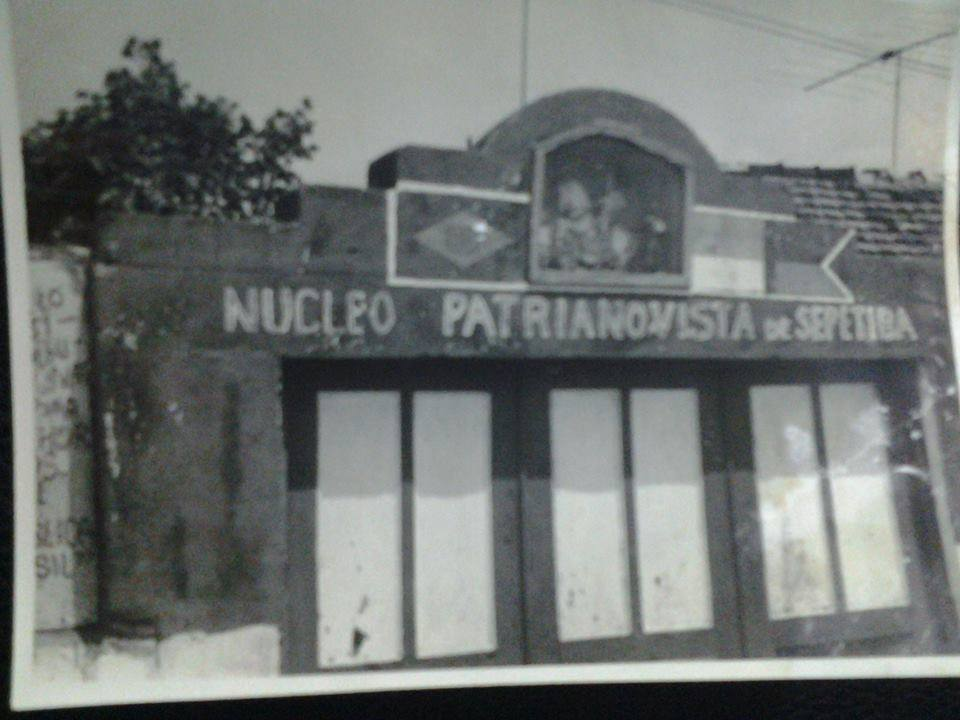
A Patrianovist Center in Sepetiba

The first contact between the two movements happened in 1930 when, in Política, the Portuguese offered their sympathy for Pátria-Nova and classified them as an interesting movement. In the same year, the School Board of Lusitanian Integralism published an article written by Couto Magalhães, first published in Pátria-Nova. Both groups continued to contact each other with great intensity.

=== Centro Dom Vital ===
According to George Wink, the AIPB was undistinguishable from the Centro Dom Vital, a catholic association, where Arlindo Veiga was the treasurer, and the leader of the CDV was a contributor to the Pátria-Nova newspaper.

=== Liga Eleitoral Católica ===
The Liga Eleitoral Católica (Catholic Electoral League) was an organization created to gather support for candidates that subscribed to the Social Doctrine of the Roman Catholic Church. The Liga counted with the support of the Patrianovist movement "for Religious reasons" in their efforts to elect their politicians.

=== Imperial legitimacy ===
The movement was later supported by the then-pretender to the Brazilian throne Prince Pedro Henrique of Orléans-Braganza, which wrote letters as early as 1933 to the party, congratulating them on their efforts in establishing an organic monarchy. In 1945, when the descendants of Emperor Pedro II of Brazil returned to Brazil, the two entities became closer than ever, signaling the approval of the movent from the Orleans-Braganca family.

== Structure ==
The Patrianovist had a hierarchical structure, with the Headquarters in São Paulo. In each different city, there was a Center for studies, composed normally of a Leader, a secretary and a treasurer. Each "Centro" bore the name of a different Patron saint, normally either a member of the Brazilian imperial family or a notable Noble from the Empire of Brazil. There were also Regional Councils, such as the one in the State of Santa Catarina, headed by Elias J. Domit, and a Supreme Council, located in the city of São Paulo. There were at least 200 centers as of 1935.

Known Municipal Patrianovist Centers
Center Name	Headquarters	Leader	Local Newspaper
Centro Monarquista de Cultura Social e Política	São Paulo	Arlindo Veiga dos Santos	"Pátria-Nova"
Centro D. Luiz de Bragança	Rio de Janeiro	Mario Sombra
Centro de Cultura Social D. Pedro Henrique	Recife	Nilo Pereira & Guilherme Auler	"Monarchia" & "O Estado"
Centro Monarquista de Cultura Política Príncipe Imperial	Petrópolis	Maya Monteiro & Torres Guimarães & Mario Cardoso de Miranda	"Correio Imperial"
Centro Imperial de Estudos Políticos e Sociais Princesa D. Maria Pia	Niterói	Ségio Alvim
Centro Patrianovista	Canivete	Guilherme Buch
Centro Patrianovista Princesa Isabel	União da Vitória	Victorino Vital
Centro Imperial D. Luiz de Bragança	Caratinga	Leonel Fountoura de Oliveira	"O Município"
Chefia Patrianovista Visconde de Ouro Preto	Ouro Preto	Jurandyr Campos
Núcleo Patrianovista	São Vicente de Ferrer	José Penha Vilela
Centro Patrianovista	Andrelândia	Priest Pedro Carvalho Ciruffo
Núcleo Patrianovista	Ribeirão Vermelho	Luís W. Sobrinho
Centro Patrianovista	Barbacena	Joaquim de Oliveira Fonseca
Centro Imperial Patrianovista	Porto União	Elias J. Domit
Centro de Cultura Social Conde D'Eu	Natal	Luiz Camara Cascudo
Centro Imperial	Cuiabá	Severino Benedicto de Almeida
Centro de Cultura Social Princesa Isabel	João Pessoa	Moacyr Coelho	"Restauração"
Centro imperial Patrianovista	Cruz Machado	-
Centro Imperial Patrianovistaj	Belo Horizonte	-
Centro Patrianovista Marquês do Herval	Boa Viagem	-
Centro Imperial Patrianovista	Fortaleza	-	"O Império"
Centro D. Pedro Henrique	Olinda	-
Centro Imperial	São Mateus	-
Centro Imperial	Palmas, Paraná	-
Centro Imperial	Joinville	-
Centro Imperial	Vallões	-
Centro Imperial Patrianovista Imperatriz Leopoldina	Manaus	-
Centro Patrianovista Marquês de Inhambupe	Inhambupe	-
Centro Imperial	Tucuruvi	-
Centro Imperial	Franca	-
Centro Imperial	Campinas	-
Centro Príncipe do Grão-Pará	Belém	-
Centro Patrianovista Tenente Antonio João	São José do Rio Preto
-	Livramento	Carlos Vargas
-	Porto Alegre	-
-	Ribeirão Preto	-
-	Tabapuã	-

== See also ==
- Brazilian Integralism
- Brazilian Integralist Action
- Lusitanian Integralism
- Action française
- Charles Maurras
- Monarchism in Brazil
- Diretório Monárquico do Brasil

== Bibliography and references ==
- Veiga dos Santos, Arlindo (1946). Das Raízes Históricas do Patrianovismo. Brazil.
- Cazetta, Felipe (2017). "Pátria-Nova e Integralismo Lusitano: propostas autoritárias em contato por meio de revistas luso-brasileiras". Tempo. 24. Scielo: 41–54. doi:10.1590/TEM-1980-542X2018v240103. Archived from the original on August 8, 2021.
- Malatian, Teresa (2013). "O tradicionalismo monarquista (1928-1945)". Revista Brasileira de História das Religiões. 6 (16). RBHR: 75–96. Archived from the original on August 8, 2021.
- Veiga dos Santos, Arlindo (1962). Idéias Que Marcham No Silêncio.
- Veiga dos Santos, Arlindo (1933). Para a Ordem Nova.
- Domingues, Petrônio (2006). O "messias" negro? Arlindo Veiga dos Santos (1902–1978)* "Viva a nova monarquia brasileira; Viva Dom Pedro III !".
- Vargas, Getúlio (1937). "Decreto-Lei Nº 37, de 2 de Dezembro de 1937". "Art. 3º Fica proibida, até a promulgação da lei eleitoral, a organização de partidos políticos, seja qual for a forma de que se revista a sua constituição, ainda que de sociedades civis destinadas ostensivamente a outros fins, uma vez se verifique haver na organização o propósito próximo ou remoto de transformá-la em instrumento de propaganda de idéias políticas."
- Cazetta, Felipe (2016). Fórmulas Antidemocráticos No Além-Mar: Análises em torno do Integralismo Lusitano e da Ação Integralista Brasileira (1914–1937) (PDF).
- Malatian, Teresa (1981). "Pátria Nova: Por Deus, Pel Brasil e Pelo Imperador". Projeto História: Revista do Programa de Estudos Pós-Graduados de História. 1.
- Rezzutti, Paulo (2015). D. Pedro: a história não contada (in Brazilian Portuguese). LeYa. ISBN 978-85-7734-583-0.
- Cazetta, Felipe (2015). Deus, Pátria, Familia... Monarquia: Ação Imperial Patrionovista e Ação Integralista Brasileira - Choques e Consonâncias.
- Barroso, Gustavo (1935). O Que O Integralista Deve Saber. Brazil.
- Brian Soares, Stephan (2019). ARLINDO VEIGA DOS SANTOS: ENTRE O PATRIANOVISMO E A FRENTE NEGRA BRASILEIRA (PDF).
- Quadros, Marcos (2017). "Conservadorismo coroado: movimentos monarquistas no Brasil atual". Estudos de Sociologia. 22 (42). doi:10.52780/res.9113.
- "Na Ação Monárquica Brasileira". O Globo. June 6, 1935.
- "Ação Imperial Patrianovista Brasileira". CEDIC-PUC-SP.
- Bezerra, Juliana (2013). "Ditadura Militar no Brasil (1964–1985)". Toda Matéria.
- Menuzzier & Werk, Renan & Kauê (2020). Pátria-Nova. Ação Orleanista.
- Wink, Gorg (2021). Brazil, Land of the Past: The Ideological Roots of the New Right.
- Jacino, Rematis (2022). Frente Negra, Ação Integralista e o conservadorismo como estratégia de enfrentamento ao racismo – 1930-1937.
- Pacheco, Gabriela; Bento, Alice (2022). "Fascismo, catolicismo e corporativismo: conexões entre patrianovismo e integralismo" [Fascism, Catholicism and corporatism: connections between Patrianovism and Integralism]. Faces da História (in Portuguese). 9 (2).

[[Category:Or ganisas based in São Paulo]]
