= Imperial Patrianovist Guard =

- Guarda Imperial Patrianovista
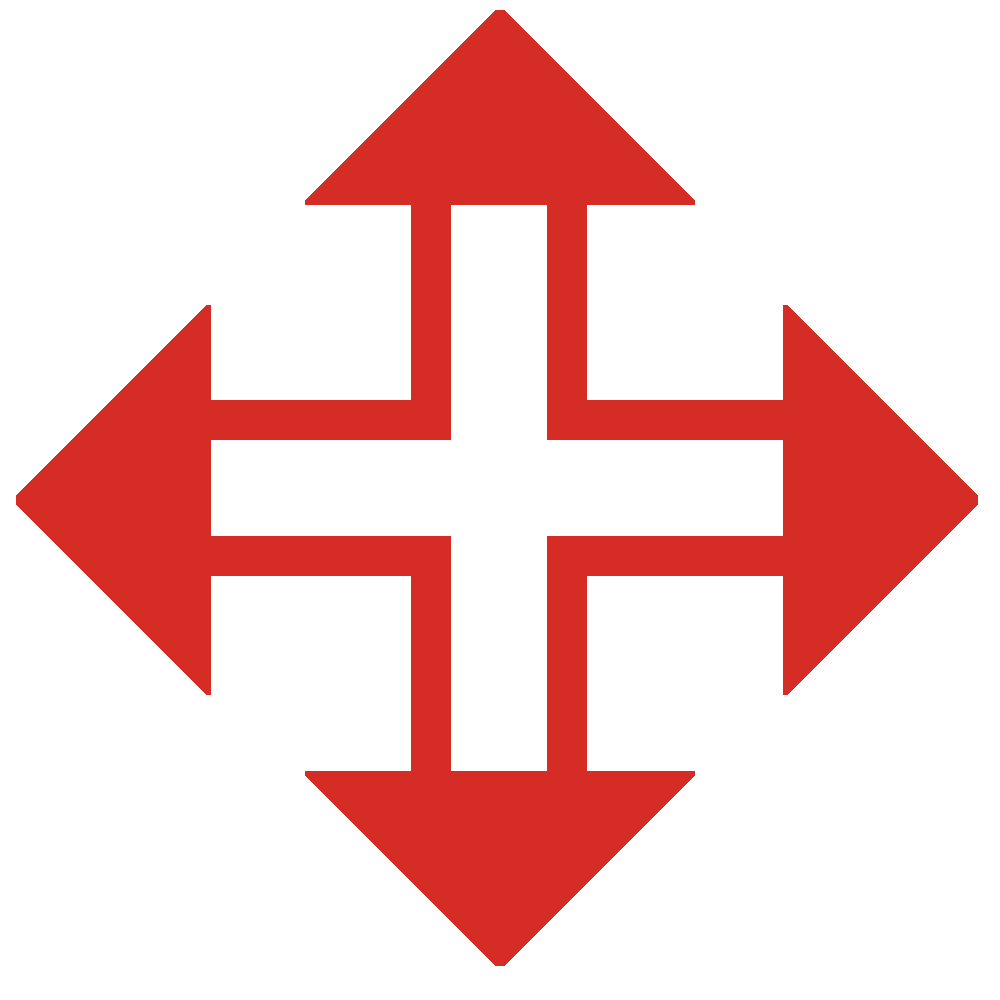
- Patrianovist red arrow cross
- Other name: Camisas Brancas
- Leaders: Arlindo Veiga dos Santos; Carlos Guedes
- Founded: 1932
- Dissolved: 1937
- Country: Brazil
- Allegiance: House of Orleans-Braganza
- Headquarters: São Paulo
- Ideology: Patrianovism

The Imperial Patrianovist Guard (Portuguese: Guard Imperial Patrianovista, GUIP) commonly called the Whiteshirts (Portuguese: Camisas brancas) was the paramilitary wing of the Brazilian Patrianovist Imperial Action (AIPB). Its members distinguished themselves from other organization's paramilitary, such as the integralists Greenshirts, by wearing their white uniforms.

According to historian Joaquim P. Dutra Silva, the creation of the guard was extremely important, given the context in which it was created, as to maintain appearances, since paramilitary groups were considered to be in vogue and even though the patrianovist guard was pacifiic, they would still carry on the symbols they represent.

== History ==
In 1932, the paramilitary group was formed to "defend a Christian Brazil against the attacks of communism" and prepare the country for the establishment of the third Empire. The overwhelming majority of the group's members were in their youth, ecstatic after they heard the speeches which were given by Veiga, who supported the toppling of the "little, ridiculous, liberal-Judeo-Freemason-republican treacherous Brazil through the pen, through the word, and weapons". Just as other third-position movements had their salutes which they used to greet other members with, the Patrianovists would shout "Glória" (Glory), an alternative to "Por Deus, pelo Brasil, pelo Imperador" (For God, Brazil, Emperor), with their right arms lightly uplifted, holding their first three fingers counting from their thumbs up. "Glória" is a shortened version of "Glória to the Santíssima Trindade", which means "Glory to the most Holy Trinity". Even though the GUIP was supposed to be a paramilitary organization, they did not take any military action, never truly bearing weapons, as the true intent of the group was to showcase patrianovism, since most political organizations, such as the AIB, had their own militia. However, as Pátria Nova was not a moviment of the masses, the GUIP was never able to get to even grounds with the integralists green shirts.

== Activities ==
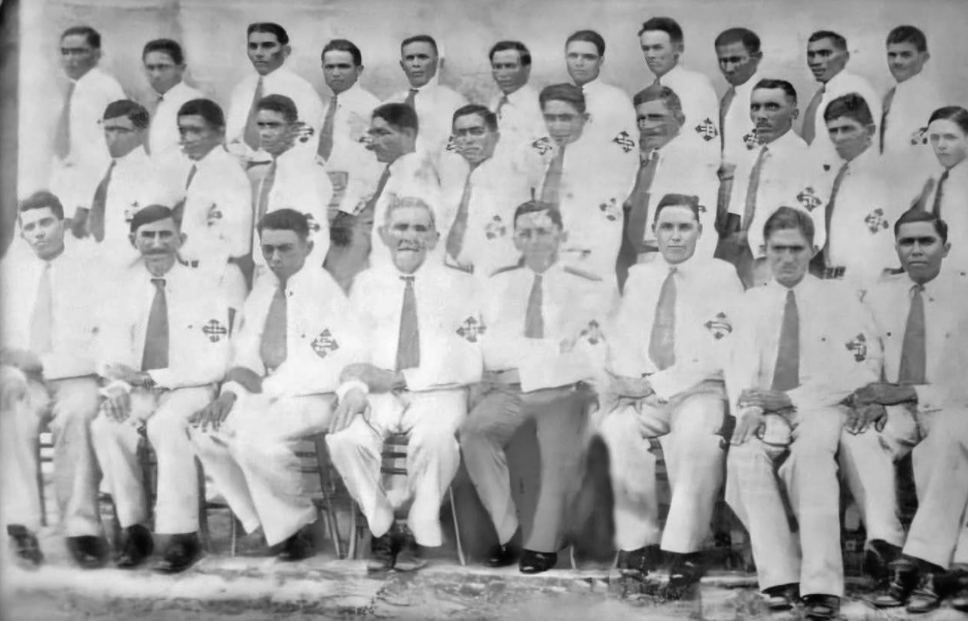
Patrianovists of the 1930s

Even though Arlindo requested to raise up arms, the GUIP remained mostly pacific in the scenario of the different factions during the 1930s, not raising arms. Being more pacific than other paramilitary organizations, such as the paramilitary groups from the communist Ação Libertadora Nacional and the integralist Brazilian Integralist Action, the GUIP were more interested in cultural research, rather than militancy that could lead to any clashes with the other groups. That, however, didn't prevent conflicts seldomly spawning between opposing factions, such as the communists.

The Guard also had to partake, at least once a week, in exercises.

== Organization ==
The militias were organized so that different provinces and municipalities had groups, with members ranging from 15 years old to 40 years old, although the organizers expressed regurlaly that the movement was composed mostly by the youth.

== Bibliography and references ==
- Malatian, Teresa (2013). "O tradicionalismo monarquista (1928-1945)". Revista Brasileira de História das Religiões. 6 (16). RBHR: 75–96.
- Domingues, Petrônio (2006). O "messias" negro? Arlindo Veiga dos Santos (1902–1978)* "Viva a nova monarquia brasileira; Viva Dom Pedro III !".
- Malatian, Teresa (1981). "Pátria Nova: Por Deus, Pel Brasil e Pelo Imperador". Projeto História: Revista do Programa de Estudos Pós-Graduados de História. 1.
