= Brazilian Black Front =

Brazilian Black Front Frente Negra Brasileira
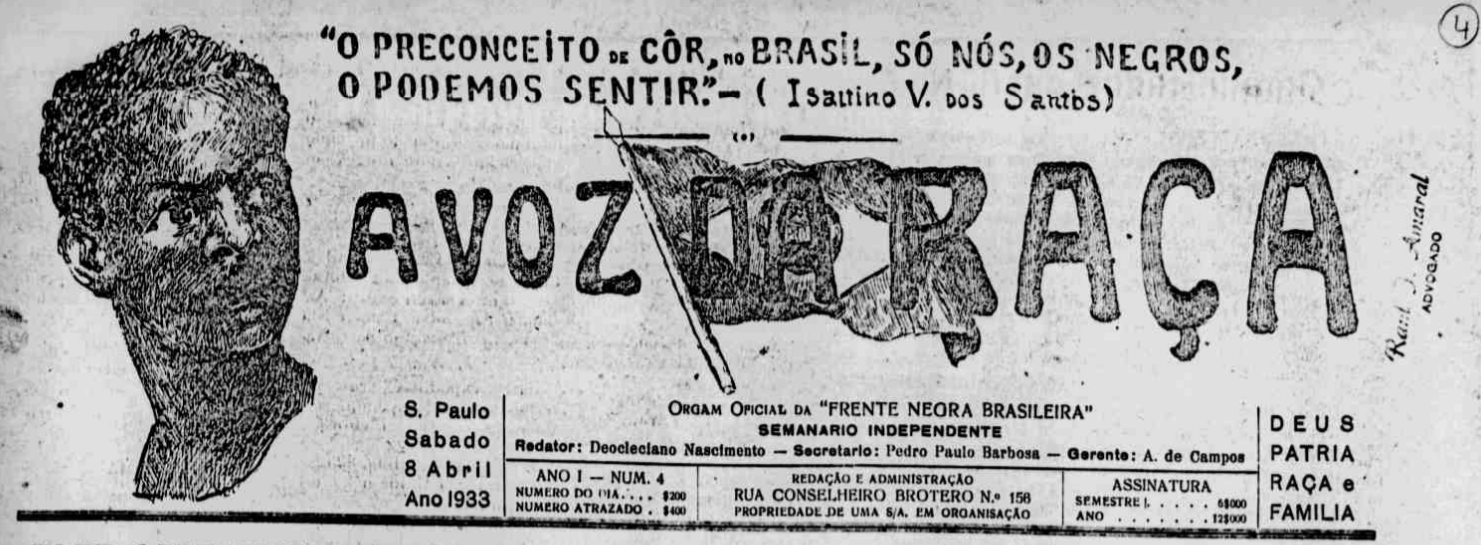
- Abbreviation: FNB
- Historical leaders: Arlindo Veiga dos Santos; José Correia Leite
- Founded: September 16, 1931
- Dissolved: May 1938
- Newspaper: O Clarim da Alvorada
- Ideology: Afro-Brazilian interests Ultranationalism; National syndicalism Factions: Patrianovism (Arlindo); Socialism (Leite)
- Political position: Far-right
- Colors: Black

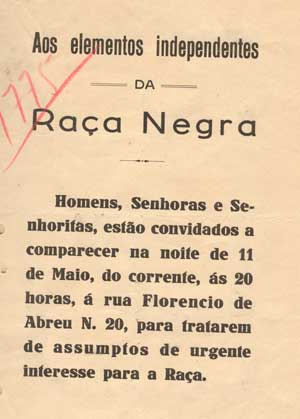
Frente Negra Brasileira Pamphlet

The Brazilian Black Front (Portuguese: Frente Negra Brasileira, FNB), part of the Black Movement of Brazil, was Brazil's first political party representing the Black community. Formed in 1931 and active until the November 10, 1937 suspension of political parties by the then president, Getúlio Vargas, the Frente mobilized Brazil's Afro-Descendant community for a project of racial equality. Desegregation campaigns and popular education focusing on literacy were just two of the ways the Frente engaged in activism.

The party was organized by Arlindo Veiga dos Santos following the Revolution of 1930. It was the first national organization of Afro-Brazilians. The party spread from São Paulo to most of the major states in Brazil including Minas Gerais, Espírito Santo, Bahia, and Rio Grande do Sul. A majority of the chapters were located in São Paulo, Minas Gerais, and Rio Grande do Sul. Many of the chapters were informal and lacked a connection to the main organization.

Besides Veiga dos Santos, José Correia Leite also led the frente. While Arlindo was a promotor of Patrianovism, a far-right ideology, Leite was closer to socialist ideals.

Frente Negra Brasileira was very active within the community and provided social gatherings and services as well as addressing the political concerns of its members. On December 17, 1931, in the first year of its existence, the Frente Negra Brasileira achieved one of its first success stories, the desegregation of public skating rinks. This was following protest by the group to police and threats of violence if the rinks were not shut down. As a political party, the Frente Negra Brasileira also would run candidates for political office, and although they never successfully put a candidate in office they were able to dramatically increase the number of registered voters before the 1934 election. Outside of the political concerns addressed, Frente Negra Brasileira also provided services to its members including literacy and vocational classes, health clinics, jazz and samba bands, and legal services. On Sunday nights, the group would host a domingueira that was a meeting open to the public. These meetings would last roughly 4 hours and became a social gathering for members of the community. During these events, the first part was for business and the directors would speak about what was going on, but afterwards there was time for music and poetry. Throughout their existence, the Frente Negra Brasileira published a newspaper, A Voz da Raça (The Voice of the Race), which provided news about black communities in Brazil and around the world.

== See also ==
- Patrianovism

== Sources ==
Butler, Kim D. "Up from Slavery: Afro-Brazilian Activism in Sao Paulo, 1888-1938." The Americas 49.2 (1992): 179-206.

Butler, Kim D. (1998). Freedoms Given, Freedoms Won : Afro-Brazilians in Post-Abolition São Paulo and Salvador. New Brunswick, NJ: Rutgers University Press. ISBN 978-0-8135-2504-4.

Hanchard, Michael (1994). Orpheus and power : the Movimento negro of Rio de Janeiro and São Paulo, Brazil, 1945-1988. Princeton N.J.: Princeton University Press. ISBN 978-0-691-03292-4.

Fernandes, Florestan (1969). The Negro in Brazilian society. New York: Columbia University Press.

Kimberly Jones-de-Oliveira, "The Politics of Culture or the Culture of Politics: Afro-Brazilian Mobilization, 1920-1968," Journal of Third World Studies, v. 20, part I (2003)

Reichmann, Rebecca Lynn. Race in Contemporary Brazil: From Indifference to Inequality. University Park, PA: Pennsylvania State UP, 1999.
