= 1993 Brazilian constitutional referendum =

- 21 April 1993
- Which form and which system of government should be applied in Brazil?

Form of government
Republic	86.60%
Monarchy	13.40%

System of government
Presidentialism	69.09%
Parliamentarism	30.91%
- Results by state

A constitutional referendum was held in Brazil on 21 April 1993 to determine the form of government of the country. After the re-democratization of Brazil, an article in the new Constitution determined the holding of a referendum for voters to decide if the country should remain a republic or become a monarchy again, and if the system of government should be presidential or parliamentary. Voting for "monarchy" and "presidentialism" in tandem would annul one's vote.

At the time, the country had been a republic for 104 years since the coup d'état that overthrew the monarchy on 15 November 1889 and, apart from a brief parliamentarian experience between 1961 and 1963 (also defeated in a referendum), the system had been presidential. Since the republic was originally a provisional government resulting from a military coup, a decree under the first republican Constitution predicted another referendum to popularly legitimate or change the current form of government.

As to the 1993 referendum, the Constitution specified that Congress, sitting in joint session, would be empowered to effect a revision of the Constitution in 1994 by an absolute majority instead of the qualified majority procedure with separate votes in both houses of Congress that is usually required for constitutional amendments; any change of regime decided during the referendum would be adopted during the said constitutional revision.

Federal Law n° 8.624, signed into law by President Itamar Franco on 4 February 1993, regulated the holding of the referendum.

An overwhelming majority of voters favored the republican regime and the presidential system. In spite of heavy campaigning on TV and radio, turnout was relatively low (73%), considering that voting is compulsory in the country.

== Origin ==
The attempted resurrection of the imperial monarchy came from federal deputy Antônio Henrique Bittencourt da Cunha Bueno (from São Paulo's Democratic Social Party), a member of the Constituent Assembly which approved the 1988 Constitution to replace the 1967 constitution enacted during the military dictatorship (1964–1985). A monarchist since childhood, and son of Antônio Sílvio Cunha Bueno, one of SDP's founders in São Paulo, he decided to propose to his fellow deputies the holding of a referendum to give the people the possibility to choose the form of government they preferred. His main argument was that during the reign of Pedro II, Brazil had experienced a period of great stability and that the republic itself was established through a coup d'état perpetrated by the military.

Surprisingly, his proposal was included in the new Constitution. Bueno managed to convince the Constituent Assembly that, since the Republic had been proclaimed in Brazil by means of a military coup d'état in 1889, without any say of the people, the Brazilian nation should be given the chance of deciding the form of government of their choice. Given that when the Constitution was approved in 1988, the country was in a process of returning to democracy after a long military regime, the idea of giving the people the opportunity to decide their form of government (either choosing the restoration of the monarchy or opting for the republic, an option that would give popular legitimacy to a form of government that had been first imposed in a military coup) gained wide support in the Constituent Assembly.

Also, several members of the Assembly were in favour of a parliamentary republic (the original drafts of the constitution provided for a parliamentary system of government within a republic, but a vote by the Assembly altered the draft so as to preserve the presidential executive); those members of the Assembly who favored a parliamentary model and who had been defeated in the system of government vote then supported the proposal that led to the inclusion in the constitution of the provision summoning the referendum. The supporters of a parliamentary republic, who desired only a referendum on the system of government (parliamentary or presidential) voted in favour of Bueno's proposal for a question also dealing with the form of government (monarchy or republic), because they thought that all monarchists would also vote for a parliamentary model in the system of government question.

In May 1992, Bueno launched the Parliamentary Monarchist Movement alongside Prince Pedro Gastão of Orléans-Braganza, then head of the Petrópolis branch of the Brazilian Imperial Family and one of the two claimants to the defunct Brazilian throne. According to him, only petistas were able to rival the monarchist militancy. On 4 February 1993, President Itamar Franco signed into law the bill N° 8.624, which regulated the holding of the referendum.

== Campaign ==
According to some polling institutes, the monarchist campaign was able to obtain the support of 22% of the voters in 1992. Concerned about this, the main political parties at that time, such as the PT, PFL, PMDB and PTB, formed the so-called Presidential Front on one side and the Parliamentary Front (PSDB) on the other side in order to oppose the ambitions of royalist groups. In spite of the defeat obtained by the monarchist movement, their slogan Vote for the king (Portuguese: Vote no rei!) became one of the most well known in the history of Brazilian electoral campaigns, and 13.4% of the voters supported a monarchical regime.

== Controversies ==
The 1993 plebiscite was marked by several controversies, particularly regarding the treatment of the monarchist option. The Superior Electoral Court (Portuguese: Tribunal Superior Eleitoral, TSE) was criticized for not allowing members of the Brazilian Imperial Family to participate in the free television campaign slots, which, according to monarchists, hindered the personalization and proper representation of their proposal. There were also concerns about the speed and transparency of the vote counting process, as well as the extremely limited airtime allocated to the monarchy compared to the other options. After the vote, the significant number of ballots cast in favor of the monarchy — over 13% — was largely ignored in public and political discourse, leading supporters of the monarchist cause to claim symbolic erasure of that portion of the electorate.

== Results ==
Voter strength for monarchism in the referendum

Voter strength for parliamentarism in the referendum

Form of government
Choice	Votes	%
Republic	43,881,747	86.60
Monarchy	6,790,751	13.40
Total	50,672,498	100.00
Valid votes	50,672,498	76.51
Invalid votes	8,741,289	13.20
Blank votes	6,813,179	10.29
Total votes	66,226,966	100.00
Registered voters/turnout	90,256,552	73.38
Source: Superior Electoral Court

System of government
Choice	Votes	%
Presidentialism	36,685,630	69.09
Parliamentarism	16,415,585	30.91
Total	53,101,215	100.00
Valid votes	53,101,215	80.58
Invalid votes	9,606,163	14.58
Blank votes	3,193,763	4.85
Total votes	65,901,141	100.00
Registered voters/turnout	90,256,552	73.02
Source: Superior Electoral Court

=== Results per state ===
State	Electorate	Abstention	Form of government				System of government			
State	Electorate	Abstention	Monarchy	Republic	Null votes	Blank votes	Parliamentarism	Presidentialism	Null votes	Blank votes
Acre	237,001 (100%)	102,191 (43.1%)	11,292 (11.1%)	90,520 (88.9%)	14,376 (10.6%)	18,622 (13.8%)	23,670 (17.56%)	86,469 (64.14%)	16,810 (12.47%)	7,861 (5.83%)
Alagoas	1,041,236 (100%)	325,352 (31.2%)	64,326 (13.4%)	414,747 (86.6%)	142,350 (19.8%)	94,461 (13.2%)	110,664 (15.46%)	392,295 (54.80%)	152,127 (21.25%)	60,798 (8.49%)
Amapá	169,409 (100%)	73,832 (43.6%)	8,838 (10.8%)	72,743 (89.2%)	5,554 (5.8%)	8,442 (8.8%)	20,369 (21.31%)	65,067 (68.08%)	6,800 (7.11%)	3,341 (3.50%)
Amazonas	1,012,167 (100%)	470,406 (46.5%)	63,575 (13.9%)	394,427 (86.1%)	33,207 (6.1%)	50,552 (9.3%)	130,214 (24.04%)	352,112 (64.99%)	37,389 (6.9%)	22,046 (4.07%)
Bahia	6,701,268 (100%)	3,052,930 (48.5%)	247,479 (9.4%)	2,372,066 (90.6%)	494,501 (13.5%)	534,762 (14.6%)	619,860 (16.99%)	2,189,245 (60%)	564,049 (15.46%)	275,654 (7.55%)
Ceará	3,809,457 (100%)	1,332,959 (35.0%)	212,748 (11.4%)	1,655.,965 (88.6%)	295,062 (11.9%)	313,723 (12.6%)	465,263 (18.79%)	1,485,525 (59.98%)	342.214 (13.82%)	183,496 (7.41%)
Federal District	908,429 (100%)	144,507 (15.9%)	69,552 (11.2%)	550,285 (88.8%)	94,667 (12.4%)	49,418 (6.4%)	233,792 (30.60%)	404,739 (52.98%)	103,961 (13.61%)	21,430 (2.81%)
Espírito Santo	1,618,431 (100%)	382,081 (23.7%)	134,398 (14.8%)	773,667 (85.2%)	188,417 (10.8%)	139,868 (11.3%)	294,872 (23.85%)	663,736 (53.69%)	207,595 (16.79%)	70,147 (5.67%)
Goiás	2,514,553 (100%)	766,846 (30.4%)	174,937 (13%)	1,171,341 (87%)	215,623 (12.3%)	185,806 (10.6%)	415,480 (23.77%)	1,008,878 (57.73%)	241,988 (13.85%)	81,361 (4.66%)
Maranhão	2,590,598 (100%)	1,518,669 (58.6%)	63,094 (7.3%)	799,739 (92.7%)	85,181 (7.9%)	123,915 (11.5%)	140,888 (13.14%)	766,456 (71.50%)	99,547 (9.29%)	65,038 (6.07%)
Mato Grosso	1,196,767 (100%)	480,481 (40.2%)	75,689 (13.7%)	477,506 (86.3%)	73,411 (10.2%)	89,680 (12.5%)	154,651 (21.59%)	434,683 (60.69%)	84,208 (11.76%)	42,744 (5.97%)
Mato Grosso do Sul	1,127,470 (100%)	288,838 (25.6%)	92,456 (14.2%)	559,890 (85.8%)	106,750 (11.5%)	43,739 (10.7%)	200,555 (23.91%)	487,588 (58.14%)	N/A	43,739 (5,22%)
Minas Gerais	10,116,428 (100%)	2,258,639 (22.3%)	731,707 (12.8%)	4,993,742 (87.2%)	1,201,226 (15.3%)	931,482 (11.8%)	1,783,708 (22.7%)	4,283,177 (54.51%)	453,157 (5.77%)	1,338,115 (17.03%)
Pará	2,616,490 (100%)	1,260,558 (48.2%)	153,898 (14.3%)	922,941 (85.7%)	113,001 (8.3%)	166,092 (12.2%)	295,435 (21.33%)	881,445 (63.65%)	131,555 (9.50%)	76,330 (5.51%)
Paraíba	1,986,739 (100%)	660,655 (33.2%)	82,876 (8.7%)	866,191 (91.3%)	201,175 (15.2%)	175,842 (13.3%)	169,452 (12.78%)	832,611 (62.78%)	227,661 (17.17%)	96,560 (7.28%)
Paraná	5,495,947 (100%)	1,189,892 (21.7%)	420,276 (12.8%)	2,855,862 (87.2%)	611,048 (14.2%)	418,869 (9.7%)	937,392 (21.77%)	2,482,818 (57.66%)	660,949 (15.35%)	224,896 (5.22%)
Pernambuco	4,247,205 (100%)	1,357,513 (32.0%)	222,020 (11.1%)	1,787,302 (88.9%)	481,357 (16.6%)	399,013 (13.8%)	397,875 (13.77%)	1,173,108 (40.6%)	134,539 (4.66%)	385,470 (13.34%)
Piauí	1,857,832 (100%)	613,604 (33%)	48,059 (4.8%)	951,774 (95.2%)	103,191 (8.3%)	141,204 (11.3%)	106,124 (11.29%)	636,689 (67.75%)	121,014 (12.88%)	75,958 (8.08%)
Rio de Janeiro	8,732,024 (100%)	1,541,654 (17.6%)	938,964 (16.3%)	4,821,310 (83.7%)	842,977 (11.7%)	587,119 (8.2%)	1,915,454 (26.64%)	4,085,953 (56.83%)	938,202 (13.05%)	250,761 (3.49%)
Rio Grande do Norte	1,417,805 (100%)	441,848 (31.2%)	58,936 (8.7%)	620,418 (91.3%)	170,266 (17.4%)	126,337 (12.9%)	138,424 (14.18%)	578,655 (59.29%)	70,667 (7.24%)	188,393 (19.30%)
Rio Grande do Sul	6,069,273 (100%)	941,185 (15.6%)	372,469 (8.8%)	3,835,721 (91.1%)	403,378 (7.9%)	516,520 (10.1%)	66,336 (20.12%)	203,852 (61.83%)	39,775 (12.07%)	19,708 (5.98%)
Rondônia	661,331 (100%)	331,660 (50.1%)	37,226 (14.9%)	213,098 (85.1%)	35,000 (10.6%)	44,347 (13.4%)	11,010 (18.51%)	41,125 (69.14%)	4,781 (8.04%)	2,566 (4.31%)
Roraima	101,947 (100%)	42,465 (41.7%)	5,121 (10.5%)	43,872 (89.5%)	4,093 (6.8%)	6,396 (10.7%)	1,088,102 (21.22%)	3,342,341 (65.18%)	471,152 (9.19%)	22,493 (0.44%)
Santa Catarina	2,974,926 (100%)	507,669 (17%)	272,577 (14.5%)	1,611,149 (85.5%)	343,173 (13.9%)	240,328 (9.7%)	590,655 (23.94%)	1,375,520 (55.75%)	370,159 (15%)	130,893 (5.31%)
São Paulo	19,812,705 (100%)	2,538,737 (12.8%)	2,210,203 (16.6%)	11,109,007 (83.4%)	2,487,620 (14.4%)	1,467,136 (8.5%)	5,962,921 (34.52%)	7,888,916 (45.67%)	2,726,511 (15.78%)	695,618 (4.03%)
Sergipe	891,788 (100%)	291,995 (32.7%)	48,252 (11.5%)	372,350 (88.5%)	109,413 (18.2%)	69,778 (11.6%)	41,712 (15.26%)	185,969 (68.04%)	27,574 (10.09%)	18,071 (6.61%)
Tocantins	621,900 (100%)	348,574 (56.1%)	19,601 (9.3%)	191,524 (90.7%)	23,442 (8.6%)	38,759 (14.2%)	91,756 (15.30%)	347,525 (57.94%)	117,580 (19.6%)	42,932 (7.16%)

== See also ==
- Monarchism in Brazil
