= Antônio Henrique Cunha Bueno =

Brazilian politician (1949–2024)

Member of the Chamber of Deputies of Brazil for São Paulo
- In office 1 February 1975 – 1 February 2003

Member of the Legislative Assembly of São Paulo
- In office 1 February 1971 – 1 February 1975

Personal details
- Born: Antônio Henrique Bittencourt Cunha Bueno; 17 June 1949 São Paulo, Brazil
- Died: 22 January 2024 (aged 74) São Paulo, Brazil
- Party: ARENA (1970–1979); PDS (1980–1993); PPR (1993–1995); PPB (1995–2024)
- Education: Mackenzie Presbyterian University
- Occupation: Economist

Antônio Henrique Bittencourt Cunha Bueno (17 June 1949 – 22 January 2024) was a Brazilian economist and politician. A member of the National Renewal Alliance, the Democratic Social Party, Reform Progressive Party, and the Progressistas, he served in the Legislative Assembly of São Paulo from 1971 to 1975 and the Chamber of Deputies from 1975 to 2003. He proposed the restoration of the Brazilian monarchy in the 1993 Brazilian constitutional referendum.

Bueno died of kidney failure in São Paulo, on 22 January 2024, at the age of 74.
