= João Alfredo Correia de Oliveira =

Brazilian politician, abolitionist and monarchist

His Excellency João Alfredo Correia de Oliveira
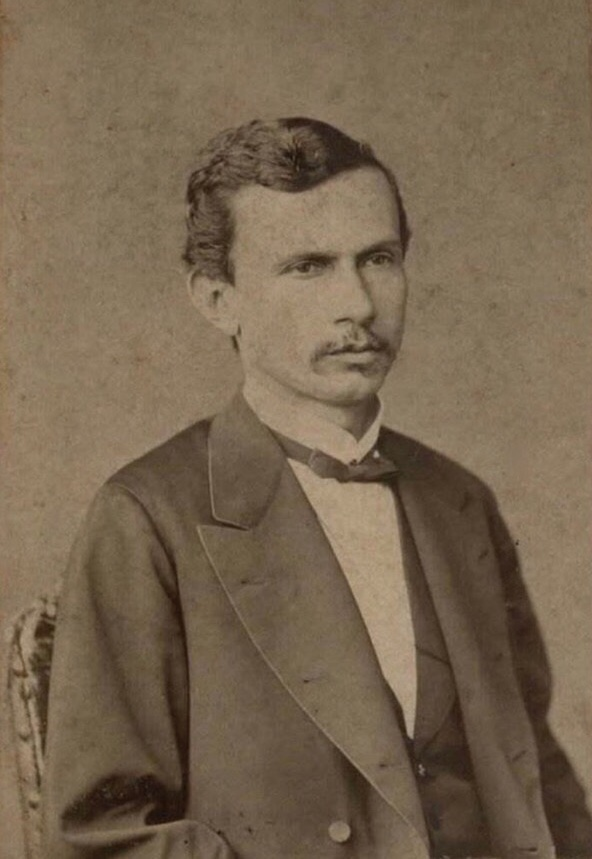

Prime Minister of Brazil
- In office 10 March 1888 – 7 June 1889
- Monarch: Pedro II
- Preceded by: Baron of Cotegipe
- Succeeded by: Viscount of Ouro Preto

Personal details
- Born: 12 December 1835 Ilha de Itamaracá, Empire of Brazil
- Died: 6 March 1919 (aged 83) Rio de Janeiro, Brazil
- Party: Conservative Party
- Occupation: Politician, author, lawyer, professor

João Alfredo Correa de Oliveira (12 December 1835, in Ilha de Itamaracá – 6 March 1919, in Rio de Janeiro) was a Brazilian politician, abolitionist and monarchist.

Integrated in the Conservative Party was linked to the formulation of the Law of Free Womb and the Golden Law. It was also the main articulator of the first universalizing law on civil registration in Brazil, in 1874.

He was provincial deputy, general deputy and also Minister of Business of the Empire (March 1870 to June 1875) which was the longest of a minister in this portfolio (noteworthy, since at the time few ministerial mandates lasted longer than 18 months).

Other positions held include Minister of Agriculture, President of the Council of Ministers (from 10 March 1888 to 7 June 1889), State Councilor, President of the provinces of Pará (2 December 1869 to 17 April 1870) and São Paulo (19 October 1885 to 26 April 1886) and still senator, from 1877 to 1889.

He was President of the Council of Ministers (prime minister of Emperor Pedro II), from 10 March 1888 to 7 June 1889. He was head of government and major opponent of Joaquim Nabuco in Pernambuco. His ministry secured the parliamentary approval of the Golden Law project, sanctioned by Princess Isabel, who held the position of regent of the empire because of the Emperor's trip to Europe.

He presided over the Bank of Brazil, after the proclamation of the republic.

== Imperial Cabinet ==
He was president of the Council of Ministers and simultaneously Minister of Finance.

- Ministry of the Empire: José Fernandes da Costa Pereira Júnior
- Ministry of Foreign Affairs: Antônio da Silva Prado; Rodrigo Augusto da Silva
- Ministry of Justice: Antônio Ferreira Viana
- Ministry of War: Tomás José Coelho de Almeida
- Ministry of the Navy: Luís Antônio Vieira da Silva
- Ministry of Transport and Public Works: José Fernandes da Costa Pereira Júnior
