= Arlindo Veiga dos Santos =

Brazilian intellectual and politician (1902–1978)

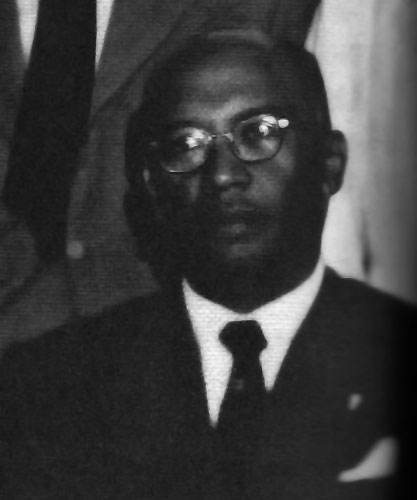

Personal details
- Born: February 12, 1902 Itu, São Paulo, Brazil
- Died: 1978 (aged 75–76) São Paulo, São Paulo, Brazil
- Party: AIPB (1928–1937, 1945–1964); FNB (1936–1938)
- Education: Faculty of Philosophy, Science and Letters of São Bento
- Known for: Monarchism, integralism, and Black activism
- Nickname(s): O Messias Negro ("The Black Messiah); O Cavaleiro Negro ("The Black Knight")

Arlindo Veiga dos Santos (February 12, 1902 – 1978) was a Brazilian intellectual, poet, writer, philosopher and politician. He was the founder of the Brazilian Patrianovist Imperial Action (AIPB) and Black Brazilian Front (FNB) and one of the most important leader of both groups.
