= Prince Luís of Orléans-Braganza (1878–1920) =

Exiled Brazilian royal

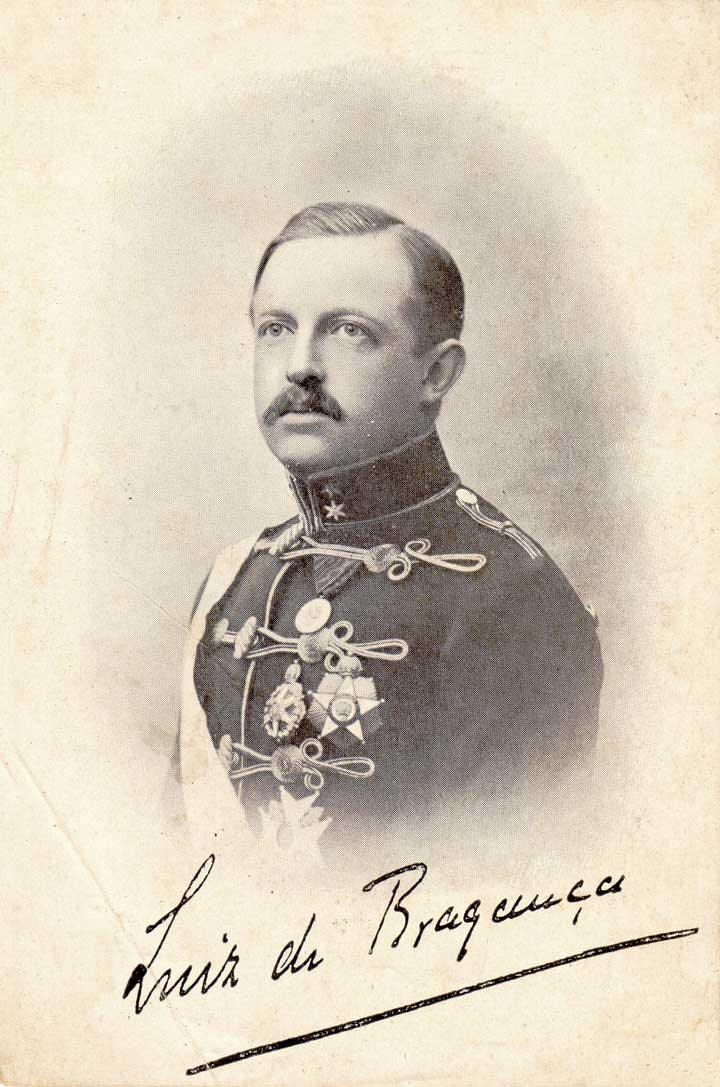
- Luís in 1909
- Born: 26 January 1878; Petrópolis, Empire of Brazil
- Died: 26 March 1920 (aged 42); Cannes, France
- Burial: Royal Chapel, Dreux, France
- Spouse: Princess Maria di Grazia of Bourbon-Two Sicilies (m. 1908)
- Issue: Prince Pedro Henrique; Prince Luís Gastão; Princess Pia Maria
Names
- Portuguese: Luís Maria Filipe Pedro de Alcântara Gastão Miguel Rafael Gonzaga de Orléans e Bragança
- House: Orléans-Braganza
- Father: Prince Gaston, Count of Eu
- Mother: Isabel, Princess Imperial of Brazil

Prince Luís of Orléans-Braganza (26 January 1878 – 26 March 1920), nicknamed "the Perfect Prince", was the second son of Isabel, Princess Imperial of Brazil and Prince Gaston, Count of Eu, and patriarch of the Vassouras branch of the House of Orléans-Braganza. His maternal grandfather, Pedro II of Brazil, was the last emperor of Brazil. After being declared successor to the title of Head of the Imperial House of Brazil by his brother Pedro de Alcântara, Prince of Grão-Pará, following the latter's abdication to get married, Luiz ended up dying before his mother, Isabel, in 1920.

He was exiled along with his family as the result of the 1889 coup d'état that resulted in the formation of the republic. In 1908, the year he married, his older brother Pedro renounced his claim to succeed his mother in her claim to the imperial throne, leaving Dom Luís as her heir. In this role, he worked with monarchists in Brazil in several attempts to restore the monarchy. At the outbreak of World War I, he enlisted as an officer with the British Armed Forces and saw action in Flanders where he contracted a virulent form of rheumatism that caused his death at the age of 42. His efforts on behalf of the Allies of World War I saw him decorated by Belgium, France and Great Britain.

== Childhood ==
Luís was born at Petrópolis on 26 January 1878, to Prince Gaston d'Orléans, Count of Eu, and Isabel, Princess Imperial of Brazil. His maternal grandparents were Pedro II, Emperor of Brazil, and Princess Teresa Cristina of the Two Sicilies while his paternal grandparents were Prince Louis, Duke of Nemours, and Princess Victoria of Saxe-Coburg and Gotha. He was named after his paternal grandfather. His name in full was Luís Maria Filipe Pedro de Alcântara Gastão Miguel Rafael Gonzaga. As the second oldest son of the heiress to the imperial throne of Brazil, he was not expected to one day ascend to the throne.

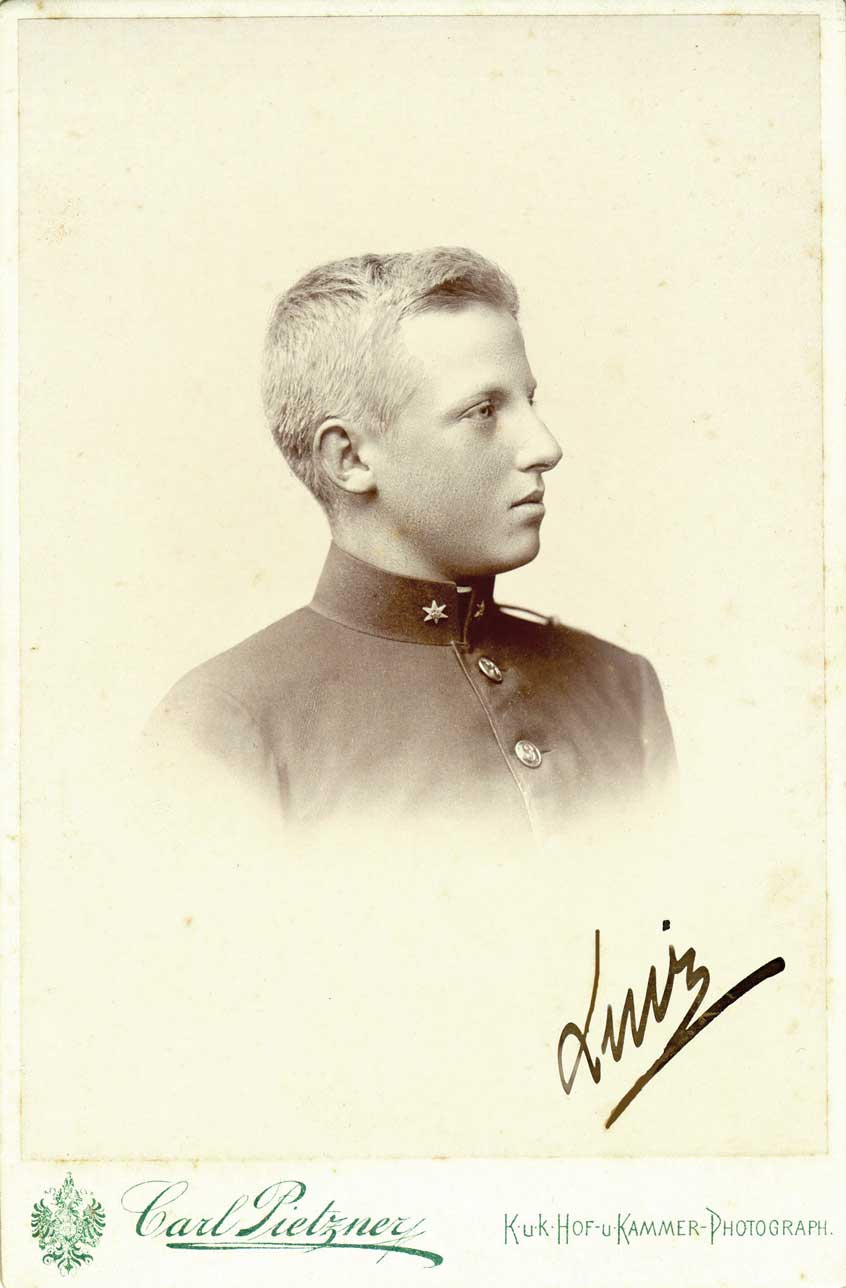
Luís in 1893.

From a young age he demonstrated a strong and determined personality. While on a trip to Europe with his family, an earthquake occurred on 23 February 1887, and while his older brother Pedro appeared very nervous and cried, Luís simply stood calm and showed no emotions. The differences between him and his oldest brother were well known. His father wrote in a letter dated February 1889 that Pedro was "just as incapable and careless in this [playing pool with Pedro II] as in everything else." Although Pedro was gentle and likeable, he did not like to study and was often clumsy, while Luís had a strong will, was active and apparently intelligent.

Gaston affirmed in another letter, written in March 1890, that "Baby Pedro [was] always notable for laziness and ineptness," while "Luís does the identical course work all by himself with admirable distinction and capacity." The prince very early showed the interest in literature that would result in his authorship of several books about his travels around the world, such as Dans les Alps, Tour d´Afrique, Where four empires meet and Under the Southern Cross.

Luís was always impelled to action thanks to his restless spirit that would take him in his childhood to sports and as an adult to politics. At the height of the campaign for the abolition of slavery in Brazil, he and his brothers published a newspaper in favor of abolitionism in the palace of Petrópolis. When the coup that replaced the monarchy with the republic occurred on 15 November 1889, Isabel preferred to send her children to Petrópolis, where later Luís would remember that "locked up in the palace, they had left us during two long days in the most complete ignorance of what was happening out there" until they were sent back to their parents and then left for forced exile. As they had not been able to take anything with them, except for a few personal objects that they could carry with their hands, the imperial family saw itself in a poor financial situation that was only made worse by Pedro II's refusal to accept the five thousand contos of Réis offered initially by the new republican government. In December 1889, the government stopped the family's income from Brazil. They had no alternative but to accept help from their few friends and from Gaston's father.

In 1890, fifteen-year-old Pedro, thirteen-year-old Luís, and their younger brother Antônio (nicknamed "Totó"), moved along with their parents to the outskirts of Versailles. After the death of Pedro II in 1891 the monarchists made various efforts to restore the monarchy in Brazil. However, none of the imperial family provided any kind of aid or even words of explicit support. Luís's older brother, Pedro, reached the age of majority in 1893, but he had no capacity or desire to assume the monarchist cause. In the same year he left for Vienna, capital of the Austro-Hungarian Empire, to study in the military school at Wiener Neustadt. According to his own mother it was "clear that he must do something and a military career seems to us the only one he should follow". Luís and his brother Antônio followed their older brother at the same military school.

== Adulthood ==
By 1896, Pedro was in love with Austro-Hungarian noblewoman Elisabeth "Elsi" Dobržensky. Meanwhile, Luís was ambitious and active, eager to make his mark on the world. He was a mountaineer, and climbed Mont Blanc in September 1896. He traveled to southern Africa, central Asia and India, and later wrote and published travelogues of his experiences. Luís was seen by his parents as the only member of the Imperial family capable of helping the monarchist movement in Brazil.

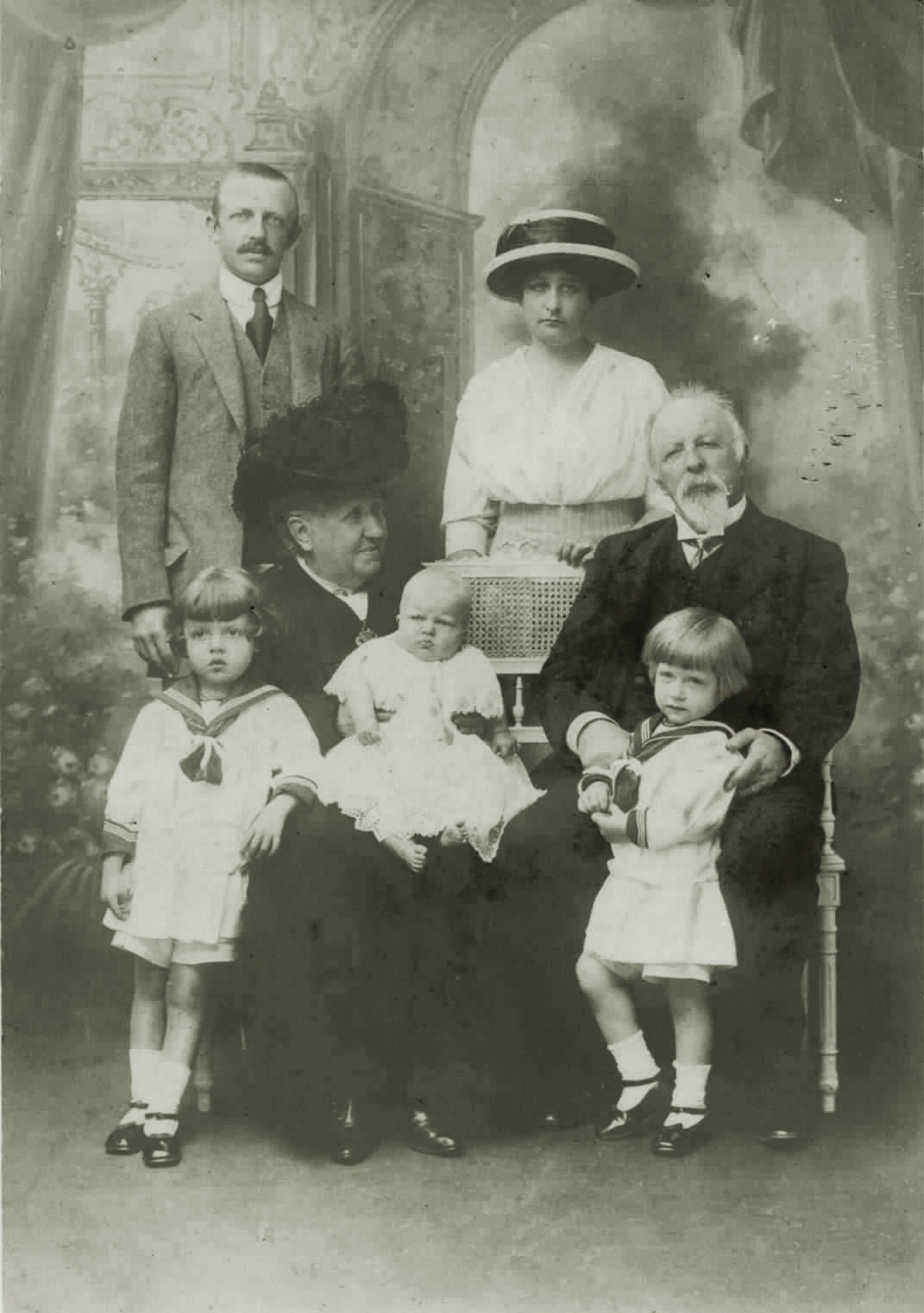
From left to right: Luís; Pedro Henrique, Prince of Grão-Pará; Isabel, de jure Empress of Brazil; Princess Pia Maria; Princess Maria Pia; Gaston d'Orléans, count of Eu and Prince Luís Gastão

After he returned to France in 1907 he planned an ambitious project to defy the decree banishing the imperial family from Brazil by travelling to Rio de Janeiro. His sudden arrival, widely discussed in newspapers, created an uproar in the old imperial capital. It also caused difficulties for Brazilian politicians by placing the imperial family at the center of attention and many Brazilians went to welcome him. However, Luís was prevented from disembarking and was not allowed to set foot on his native land by the republican government. Nonetheless, he sent his mother a telegram saying: "Hindered of disembarking by the Government, I greet the Redeemer of Slaves on the bay of Guanabara in the eve of May 13." Some time later he wrote about his experiences on this trip in the book Under the Southern Cross (Sob o cruzeiro do sul) published in 1913.

Luís became engaged to his cousin Maria Pia of Bourbon-Two Sicilies, a granddaughter of a brother of Luís's maternal grandmother, Teresa Cristina. Meanwhile, his brother Pedro, then the heir to Isabel, desired to marry Elizabeth Dobržensky. His mother disapproved of the marriage because Elizabeth was part of the minor nobility rather than royalty. Isabel agreed to accept the marriage with the condition that Pedro would renounce his position as heir. Pedro had no interest in becoming emperor and so he renounced his rights to the succession on 30 October 1908.

I Prince Pedro de Alcântara Luís Filipe Maria Gastão Miguel Gabriel Rafael Gonzaga of Orléans and Braganza, having maturely reflected, have resolved to renounce the right that, by the Constitution of the Empire of Brazil, promulgated on March 25, 1824, accords to me the Crown of that nation. I declare, therefore, that by my free and spontaneous will I hereby renounce, in my own name, as well as for any and all of my descendants, to all and any rights that the aforesaid Constitution confers upon us to the Brazilian Crown and Throne, which shall pass to the lines which follow mine, conforming to the order of succession as established by article 117. Before God I promise, for myself and my descendants, to hold to the present declaration.

Cannes October 30, 1908 signed: Pedro de Alcântara of Orléans-Braganza

This renunciation was followed by a letter from Isabel to royalists in Brazil:

November 9, 1908, [Castle of] Eu

Most Excellent Gentlemen Members of the Monarchist Directory,

With all my heart I thank you for the congratulations upon the marriages of my dear children Pedro and Luís. Luís' took place in Cannes on day 4 with the brilliance that is desired for so solemn an act in the life of my successor to the Throne of Brazil. I was very pleased. Pedro's shall take place next on day 14. Before the marriage of Luís he signed his resignation to the crown of Brazil, and here I send it to you, while keeping here an identical copy. I believe that this news must be published as soon as possible (you gentlemen shall do it in the way that you judge to be more satisfactory) in order to prevent the formation of parties that would be a great evil for our country. Pedro will continue to love his homeland, and will give all possible support to his brother. Thank God they are very united. Luís will engage actively in everything with respect to the monarchy and any good for our land. However, without giving up my rights I want that he be up to date on everything so that he may prepare himself for the position which with all my heart I desire that one day he will hold. You may write to him as many times as you may want to so that he shall be informed of everything. My strength is not the same as it once was, but my heart is still the same to love my homeland and all those who are so dedicated to us. I give you all my friendship and confidence,

The marriage of Luís and Maria Pia was celebrated on 4 November at Cannes, and that of Pedro and Elizabeth ten days later at Versailles. From the union of Luís and Maria Pia three children were born: Pedro Henrique, who became the direct successor to Princess Isabel and Head of the Imperial House of Brazil after her death in 1921; Luís Gastão, and Pia Maria. Isabel did not take long to reveal her opinion about her grandchildren and wrote in a letter in 1914: "I am sending enclosed a photograph of myself with my grandchildren by Luís. Pedro Henrique is growing continually and is a very intelligent child. His grandparents have a particular love for their darling little grandchildren."

== Political activity ==
With the renunciation of the throne by his brother, Luís could finally collaborate effectively with the Brazilian monarchic movement, assuming clearly his position as heir to the throne (after his mother) and trying to assume the leadership of the restoration campaign. His efforts to reverse the damage caused by the imperial family's inertia was valued by their supporters, and in 1909 he presented a political manifest to the Brazilian monarchists with the intent to restart the stalled campaign. He had some success as he was able to congregate coreligionists in several states of Brazil. Some of the letters from the prince reveal his plans to restore the monarchy, such as the one written for Martim Francisco de Andrada III:

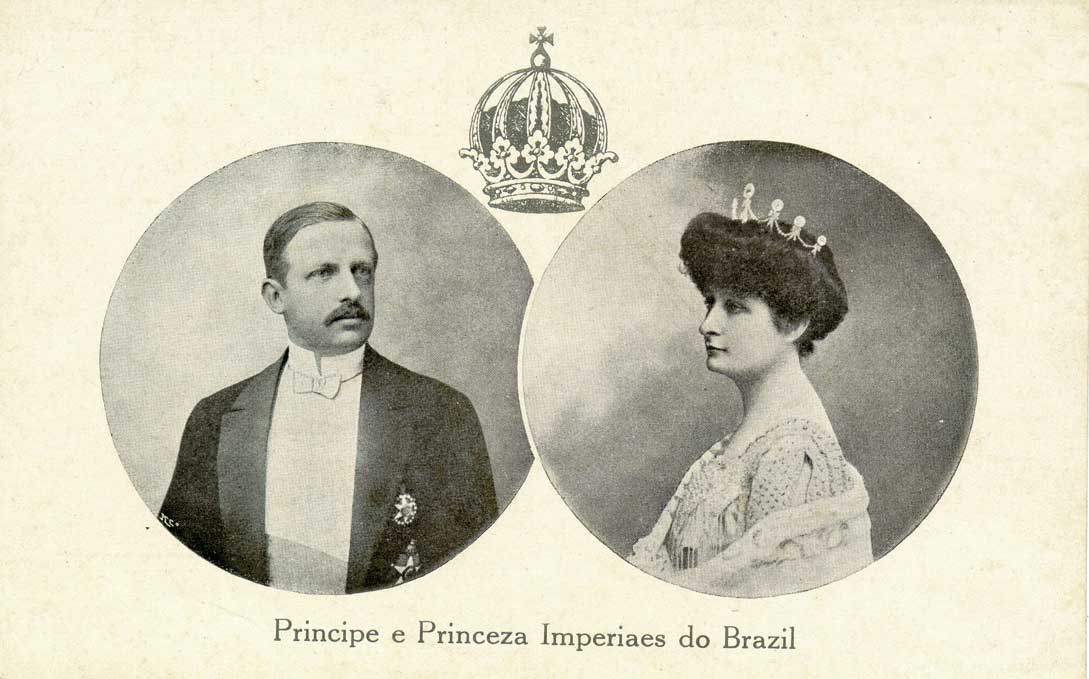
Luís and his wife, Maria Pia. Below, in old Portuguese: "Prince and Princess Imperial of Brazil"

"it costs me so much to be here with crossed arms, when I think that a handful of determined men would be enough to pull out our Fatherland from the claws of the adventurers who explore it".

"I still do not know what will be your attitude in the matter of the candidacies. As for me, I judge both the candidates 'undesirable'; but as we have to choose, I would pick Rui "[Barbosa]", whose partisans represent the element more reasonable and with bigger prestige in the country. It seems to me that we could use to advantage of the moment for an agreement with the members of this group in order to obtain a common effort for the restoration just after the presidential elections. What are your thoughts on it?"

The prince was active from 1907 through to his death in 1920, and argued in favor of federalism, obligatory military service and an improvement in the quality of life for laborers. In the first case, he was in favor of a greater degree of decentralization and economical and political freedom for the Brazilian states. In the second, he refuted the old custom of enlistment to the armed forces based on individuals coming only from particular sectors of society in favor of a truly professional military force formed by elements of all parts of society. The third, and more important case, was his proposal for a monarchy supported by social legislation that could make better conditions for Brazilian laborers possible.

Luís defended ideas that were well ahead of his time and the necessity to guarantee worthy conditions of subsistence for the Brazilian workers would only be observed thirty years later during the dictatorship of Getúlio Vargas. At the beginning of the twentieth century, neither the government nor Brazilian politicians admitted even the possibility of such basic rights as vacations, right to strike, and weekly maximum hours of work, amongst others. He said that "we monarchists must convince the laborers that the truth is that in the case of a restoration their situation could only improve". The progressive vision of Luís made him a target for accusations of being a "socialist" and a "radical" when, in reality, his intent was to hinder the work force from adhering to socialism, communism, or even anarchism.

== World War I and final years ==
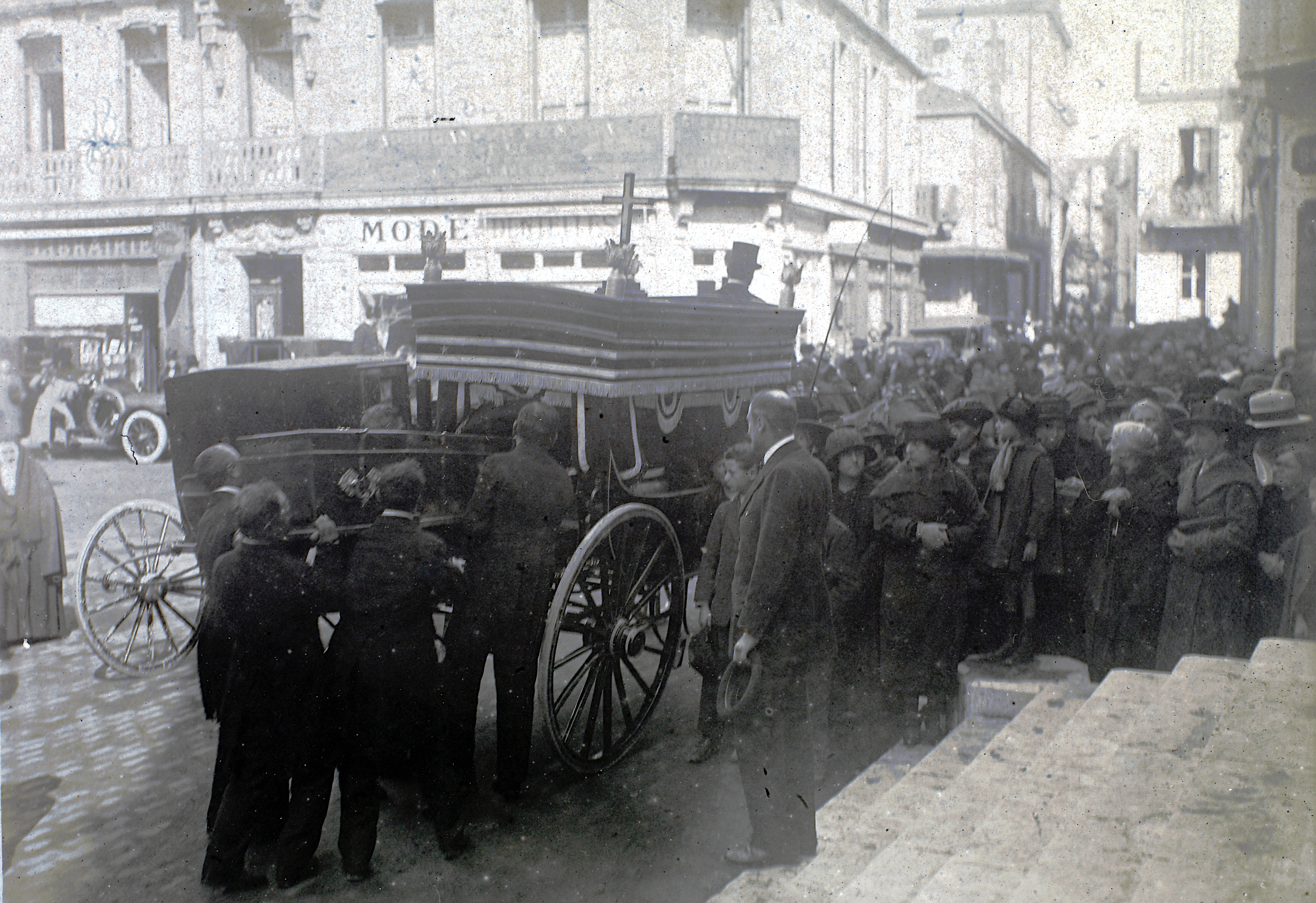
Funeral of Prince Luís in 1920

The start of World War I in August 1914 and the invasion of France by Germany made it possible for Luís to once more prove his idealism and activism as, in his own words, he was a "soldier heart and soul". He and his brother Antônio wanted to defend the homeland of their ancestors. As it was forbidden by law for them to serve in the French armed forces they both enlisted in the British armed forces as officers. Luís joined the army while Antônio served as an air force pilot.

While fighting in the trenches of Flanders in 1915 Luís contracted an aggressive type of bone rheumatism that left him very weak and incapable of walking. The prince was invalided out of active service seriously ill and taken to safety in order to be able to recover from the disease. As a consequence of his actions in the conflict and for his bravery, Luís received several decorations: Military medal of the Yser, from King Albert I of Belgium; Legion of Honour, in the degree of knight, and the Cross of War from the French government; the British War Medal, the Victory Medal and Star from the Great Britain. The serious illness contracted in the trenches proved resistant to all treatments and his health gradually deteriorated until he died on 26 March 1920. As his mother lived until 1921, her successor in pretense to the throne of Brazil was her grandson, Pedro Henrique, Luís's son.

"He died, unexpectedly, in Cannes, D. Luiz de Orléans e Bragança, died in exile where he was purging the crime of being Pedro II grandson. He had inherited the qualities of his grandfather, his nobility of soul, his heart, his love for letters. He left in the memory of those who knew him the indelible mark that can only print the elected creature of moral elevation; and in the memory of those who read him, the admiration for a talent of choice. He tried, but failed, to set foot on the land of his homeland. The ridiculous republicanism of Affonso Penna blocked his step. He tried, but failed, to penetrate the Academy of Letters. These two petty things, however, only succeeded in smashing the government and the Academy. One lost an excellent opportunity to show breadth of vision; the other, the best opportunity to honor its true creator, Pedro II. D. Luiz was kept in exile because he didn't fit here. He didn't fit here in the same way that Princess Isabel, that shrew who signed the Golden Law, nor the Count of Eu, that bad man who ended the War of Paraguay, don't fit here. The Republic is coherent. Made for the use and pleasure of a rapacious mediocracy, it receives with open arms the Caillaux and the Bolo-Pachá, but does not allow the great exponents of Honor, of Honor, of Intelligence and Greatness of soul to disembark. Their presence would shame our phrygian cap..."

— Revista do Brasil

== Legacy ==
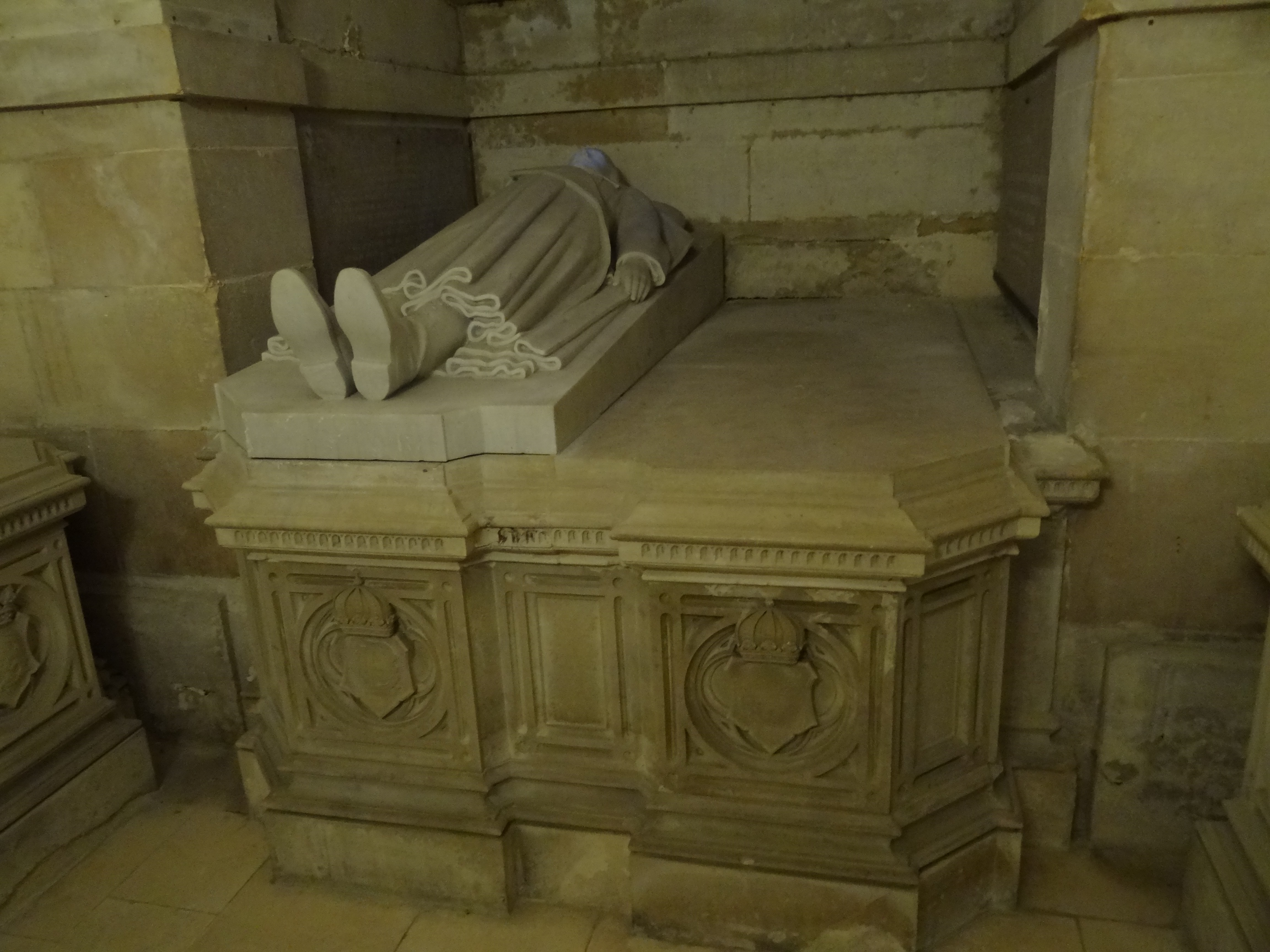
Tomb of Prince Luís and Princess Maria Pia in the Royal Chapel of Dreux, France.

Prince Luís is largely unknown to Brazilians today. He is remembered for his role as a claimant to the Brazilian throne beginning in 1908, and he was publicly involved in the campaign for restoring the monarchy. He continued to take an active role in monarchist movements until the First World War.

His support for the social welfare of working-class Brazilians, at a time when it was considered a "police case" by the rulers of the First Brazilian Republic, earned him the epithet "perfect prince" or, in the words of King Albert II of Belgium: "man as few, Prince like none".

In 1918, the Portuguese-Brazilians Rodolfo Smith de Vasconcelos, and his son, Jaime Smith de Vasconcelos, published the Brazilian Nobiliarchic Archive, a work that documents the Brazilian nobility. The authors dedicated the work to His Imperial Highness the Sire Dom Luiz de Orléans-Braganza.

The Municipality of Pimenta Bueno, in the State of Rondônia (Brazil), honored Dom Luís and the entire Brazilian imperial family in 2010 by renaming one of its streets "Príncipe Dom Luiz de Órleans e Bragança".

== Honors ==
- (Restoration (Spain)) Grand Cross of the Order of Charles III, 5 December 1879

== Children ==
By his wife, Maria Pia of Bourbon-Two Sicilies (12 August 1878 – 20 June 1973):

- Prince Pedro Henrique of Orléans-Braganza (13 September 1909 – 5 July 1981)
- Prince Luiz Gastão of Orléans-Braganza (19 February 1911 – 8 September 1931)
- Princess Pia Maria of Orléans-Braganza (4 March 1913 – 24 October 2000) ∞ René, Count de Nicolaÿ, at Paris, on 12 August 1933. Pia Maria and René had three sons.

== Ancestry ==
Ancestors of Prince Luís of Orléans-Braganza (1878–1920)

8. Louis Philippe I of France
4. Prince Louis, Duke of Nemours
9. Princess Maria Amalia Naples and Sicily
2. Prince Gaston, Count of Eu
10. Prince Ferdinand of Saxe-Coburg and Gotha
5. Princess Victoria of Saxe-Coburg and Gotha
11. Princess Maria Antonia Koháry of Csábrág and Szitnya
1. Prince Luís of Orléans-Braganza
12. Pedro I of Brazil and IV of Portugal
6. Pedro II of Brazil
13. Archduchess Leopoldina of Austria
3. Isabel, Princess Imperial of Brazil
14. Francis I of the Two Sicilies
7. Princess Teresa Cristina of the Two Sicilies
15. Infanta Maria Isabella of Spain

== Notes ==
Prince Luís of Orléans-Braganza (1878–1920) House of Orléans-Braganza Cadet branch of the House of Orléans Born: 26 January 1878 Died: 26 March 1920
Titles in pretence
Preceded by Prince Pedro de Alcântara	— TITULAR — Prince Imperial of Brazil; 30 October 1908 – 26 March 1920; Reason for succession failure: Empire abolished in 1889	Succeeded by Prince Pedro Henrique
