= Afonso Celso, Viscount of Ouro Preto =

Brazilian politician

Viscount of Ouro Preto
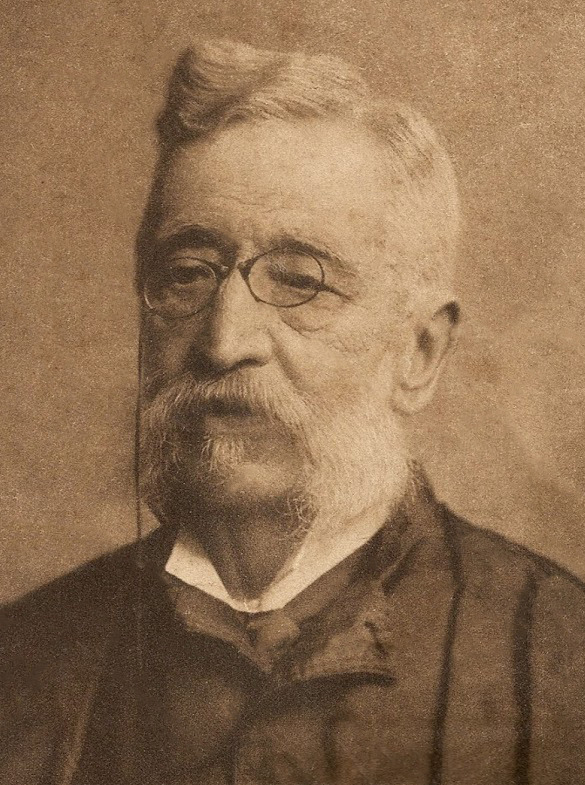

Prime Minister of Brazil
- In office 7 June 1889 – 15 November 1889
- Monarch: Pedro II
- Preceded by: João Alfredo
- Succeeded by: Office abolished
Further offices held
Minister of Finance
In office 7 June 1889 – 15 November 1889
Prime Minister	Himself
Preceded by	João Alfredo
Succeeded by	Ruy Barbosa
In office 8 February 1879 – 28 March 1880
Prime Minister	Viscount of Sinimbu
Preceded by	Silveira Martins
Succeeded by	José Antônio Saraiva
Minister of the Navy
In office 3 August 1866 – 16 July 1868
Prime Minister	Zacarias de Góis
Preceded by	Silveira Lobo
Succeeded by	Baron of Cotegipe
Senator for Minas Gerais
In office 26 April 1879 – 15 November 1889
Appointed by	Pedro II
General Deputy for Minas Gerais
In office 1 February 1877 – 26 April 1879
In office 1 January 1864 – 18 July 1868

Personal details
- Born: 21 February 1836 Ouro Preto, Minas Gerais, Empire of Brazil
- Died: 21 February 1912 (aged 76) Petrópolis, Rio de Janeiro, Brazil
- Party: Liberal
- Spouse: Francisca de Paula Martins de Toledo (m. 1859)
- Children: 6
- Parents: João Antônio Afonso (father); Maria Madalena de Figueiredo (mother)
- Education: Faculty of Law of Largo de São Francisco
- Occupation: author; lawyer; politician; professor
- Coat of Arms of the Viscount of Ouro Preto

Afonso Celso de Assis Figueiredo, Viscount of Ouro Preto (21 February 1836 – 21 February 1912) was a Brazilian politician who served as the last Prime Minister of the Empire of Brazil.

== Biography ==
=== Personal life ===
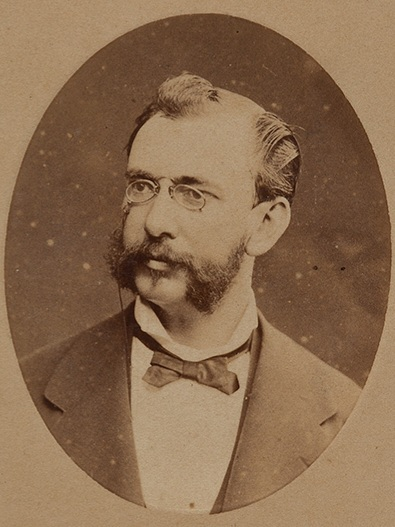
Ouro Preto in the 1860–70s

Afonso Celso was born in Ouro Preto, then the capital of the province of Minas Gerais, on 21 February 1836.

He married on 6 January 1859 with Francisca de Paula Martins de Toledo (1839–1916), the daughter of Joaquim Floriano de Toledo – a Colonel of the National Guard and counselor – and his second wife, Ana Margarida da Graça Martins.

From the marriage between the Viscount of Ouro Preto and Francisca de Paula was born the immortal Count Afonso Celso de Assis Figueiredo Júnior, who came to found the Jornal do Brasil (he would not have founded but collaborated for more than 30 years in the newspaper). Francisca de Paula was the sister of Carlota Martins de Toledo, the wife of Jorge João Dodsworth, the second Baron of Javary. Dodsworth was the brother-in-law of the Baron of Teffé and, therefore, uncle of Nair de Teffé, who was the First Lady of Brazil as the wife of President Hermes da Fonseca.

His brother, Carlos Afonso de Assis Figueiredo, was Minister of War and president of the province of Rio de Janeiro. The Viscount of Ouro Preto wrote a work of history about the first ten years of the Republic.

=== Career ===
A member of the Liberal Party, Afonso Celso was elected senator by the province of Minas Gerais and took office on 26 April 1879. He also held the positions of Secretary of Police, Inspector of the Provincial Treasury and procurator of the Treasury. Having been provincial deputy in two terms and general deputy for Minas Gerais four times.

Still in the Empire, the viscount of Ouro Preto, a convinced monarchist, embraced the abolitionist cause. As senator, he created a tax of 20 réis on the price of tram tickets, which provoked great agitation in Rio de Janeiro, known as the "Revolta do Vintém", in January 1880.

He published, among other works, the squadron and the parliamentary opposition and Advent of the military dictatorship. He was awarded the Viscount's nobiliarchic title with greatness on 13 June 1888 by Isabel, Princess Imperial of Brazil, who was acting as regent.

He was Minister of the Navy and of the Treasury and member of the Council of State. It presided over the last Council of Ministers of the Empire. Assis Figueiredo was arrested on 15 November 1889 at Campo de Santana Headquarters, on the day of the proclamation of the republic, with the whole ministry, and then exiled with the Brazilian Imperial Family.

=== Later life ===
He lived in exile until 1892, a year after the Emperor's death, when he was allowed to return and decided not to pursue a career in republican politics.

At the beginning of the 20th century, after the proclamation of the republic, he was professor of Civil and Commercial Law at the Free School of Legal and Social Sciences of Rio de Janeiro. He was one of the most important politicians of the Second Reign of the Empire of Brazil and great friend of Emperor Pedro II.

The Viscount of Ouro Preto died in Petrópolis on 21 February 1912.
