= List of ministers of justice of Brazil =

Minister of Justice and Public Security of Brazil
- Ministro da Justiça e Segurança Pública
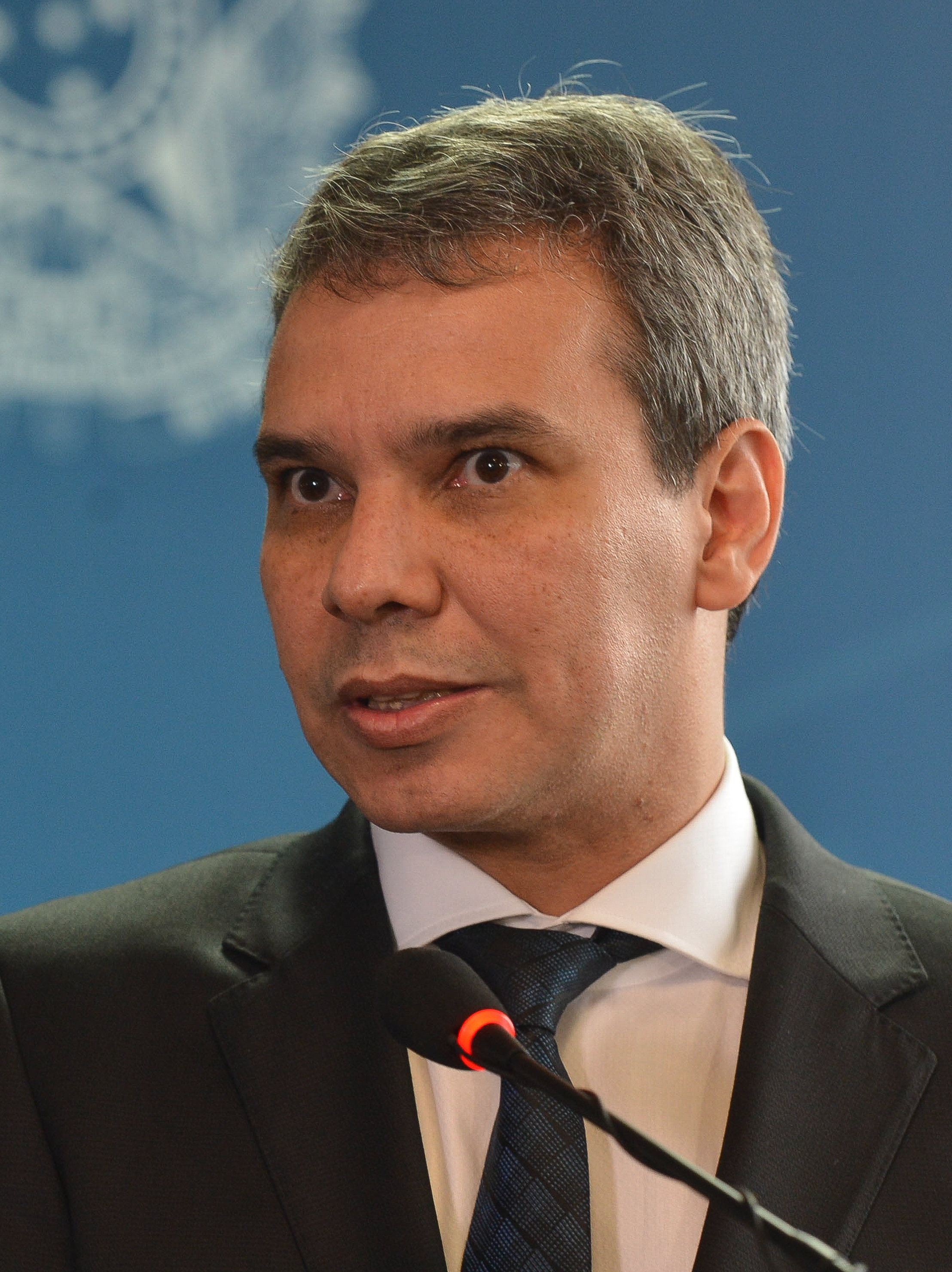
- Incumbent; Wellington Lima e Silva since 15 January 2026
- Style: Mr. Minister (informal); The Most Excellent Minister (formal); His Excellency (diplomatic)
- Type: Ministry
- Abbreviation: MJSP
- Member of: Cabinet; National Defense Council; Council of the Republic
- Reports to: the President
- Seat: Brasília, Federal District
- Appointer: President of Brazil
- Constituting instrument: Constitution of Brazil
- Formation: 3 July 1822; 204 years ago
- First holder: Caetano de Miranda Montenegro, Marquis of Vila Real da Praia Grande
- Salary: R$ 39,293.32 monthly
- Website: www.gov.br/mj/

This is a list of ministers of justice of Brazil.

== Empire of Brazil ==
=== Reign of Pedro I ===
No.	Portrait	Minister	Took office	Left office	Time in office	Monarch
1	Caetano de Miranda MontenegroMarquis of Vila Real da Praia Grande	Caetano de Miranda Montenegro; Marquis of Vila Real da Praia Grande (1748–1827)	3 July 1822	28 October 1822	117 days	Pedro I of Brazil
2	Sebastião Luís Tinoco da Silva	Sebastião Luís Tinoco da Silva (1758–1839)	28 October 1822	30 October 1822	2 days	Pedro I of Brazil
3	Caetano de Miranda MontenegroMarquis of Vila Real da Praia Grande	Caetano de Miranda Montenegro; Marquis of Vila Real da Praia Grande (1748–1827)	30 October 1822	10 November 1823	1 year, 11 days	Pedro I of Brazil
4	Clemente Ferreira FrançaMarquis of Nazaré	Clemente Ferreira França; Marquis of Nazaré (1774–1827)	10 November 1823	21 November 1825	2 years, 11 days	Pedro I of Brazil
5	Sebastião Luís Tinoco da Silva	Sebastião Luís Tinoco da Silva (1758–1839)	21 November 1825	21 November 1826	1 year, 0 days	Pedro I of Brazil
6	José Joaquim Carneiro de CamposMarquis of Caravelas	José Joaquim Carneiro de Campos; Marquis of Caravelas (1768–1836)	21 November 1826	15 January 1827	55 days	Pedro I of Brazil
7	Clemente Ferreira FrançaMarquis of Nazaré	Clemente Ferreira França; Marquis of Nazaré (1774–1827)	15 January 1827	11 March 1827	55 days	Pedro I of Brazil
8	José Feliciano Fernandes PinheiroViscount of São Leopoldo	José Feliciano Fernandes Pinheiro; Viscount of São Leopoldo (1774–1847)	11 March 1827	18 May 1827	68 days	Pedro I of Brazil
9	Estêvão Ribeiro de ResendeMarquis of Valença	Estêvão Ribeiro de Resende; Marquis of Valença (1777–1856)	18 May 1827	20 November 1827	186 days	Pedro I of Brazil
10	Lúcio Soares Teixeira	Lúcio Soares Teixeira (1792–1838)	20 November 1827	18 June 1828	211 days	Pedro I of Brazil
11	José Clemente Pereira	José Clemente Pereira (1787–1854)	18 June 1828	25 September 1828	99 days	Pedro I of Brazil
12	José Bernardino de Almeida	José Bernardino de Almeida (1783–1861)	25 September 1828	22 November 1828	58 days	Pedro I of Brazil
13	Lúcio Soares Teixeira	Lúcio Soares Teixeira (1792–1838)	22 November 1828	4 December 1829	1 year, 12 days	Pedro I of Brazil
14	João Inácio da CunhaViscount of Alcântara	João Inácio da Cunha; Viscount of Alcântara (1781–1834)	4 December 1829	19 March 1831	1 year, 105 days	Pedro I of Brazil
15	Manuel de Sousa França	Manuel de Sousa França (1780–1856)	19 March 1831	5 April 1831	17 days	Pedro I of Brazil
16	João Inácio da CunhaViscount of Alcântara	João Inácio da Cunha; Viscount of Alcântara (1781–1834)	5 April 1831	7 April 1831	0 days	Pedro I of Brazil

=== Regency period ===
No.	Portrait	Minister	Took office	Left office	Time in office	Regent
17	Manuel de Sousa França	Manuel de Sousa França (1780–1856)	7 April 1831	5 July 1831	89 days	Provisional Triumviral Regency; Permanent Triumviral Regency
18	Diogo Feijó	Diogo Feijó (1784–1843)	5 July 1831	3 August 1832	1 year, 29 days	Permanent Triumviral Regency
19	Pedro de Araújo LimaMarquis of Olinda	Pedro de Araújo Lima; Marquis of Olinda (1793–1870)	3 August 1832	13 September 1832	41 days	Permanent Triumviral Regency
20	Honório Hermeto Carneiro LeãoMarquis of Paraná	Honório Hermeto Carneiro Leão; Marquis of Paraná (1801–1856)	13 September 1832	14 May 1833	243 days	Permanent Triumviral Regency
21	Cândido José de Araújo VianaMarquis of Sapucaí	Cândido José de Araújo Viana; Marquis of Sapucaí (1793–1875)	14 May 1833	4 June 1833	21 days	Permanent Triumviral Regency
22	Aureliano CoutinhoViscount of Sepetiba	Aureliano Coutinho; Viscount of Sepetiba (1800–1855)	4 June 1833	16 January 1835	1 year, 226 days	Permanent Triumviral Regency
23	Manuel Alves Branco2nd Viscount of Caravelas	Manuel Alves Branco; 2nd Viscount of Caravelas (1797–1855)	16 January 1835	14 October 1835	271 days	Permanent Triumviral Regency
24	Antonio Paulino Limpo de AbreuViscount of Abaeté	Antonio Paulino Limpo de Abreu; Viscount of Abaeté (1798–1883)	14 October 1835	3 June 1836	233 days	Diogo Feijó
25	Gustavo Adolfo de Aguilar Pantoja	Gustavo Adolfo de Aguilar Pantoja (1798–1867)	3 June 1836	16 May 1837	347 days	Diogo Feijó
26	Francisco Jê Acaiaba de MontezumaViscount of Jequitinhonha	Francisco Jê Acaiaba de Montezuma; Viscount of Jequitinhonha (1794–1870)	16 May 1837	19 September 1837	126 days	Diogo Feijó
27	Bernardo Pereira de Vasconcelos	Bernardo Pereira de Vasconcelos (1795–1850)	19 September 1837	16 April 1839	1 year, 209 days	Pedro de Araújo Lima, Marquis of Olinda
28	Francisco de Paula Almeida e Albuquerque	Francisco de Paula Almeida e Albuquerque (1792–1869)	16 April 1839	1 September 1839	138 days	Pedro de Araújo Lima, Marquis of Olinda
29	Francisco Ramiro de Assis Coelho	Francisco Ramiro de Assis Coelho	1 September 1839	18 May 1840	260 days	Pedro de Araújo Lima, Marquis of Olinda
30	José Antônio da Silva Maia	José Antônio da Silva Maia (1789–1853)	18 May 1840	23 May 1840	5 days	Pedro de Araújo Lima, Marquis of Olinda
31	Paulino Soares de Sousa1st Viscount of Uruguai	Paulino Soares de Sousa; 1st Viscount of Uruguai (1807–1866)	23 May 1840	24 July 1840	62 days	Pedro de Araújo Lima, Marquis of Olinda

=== Reign of Pedro II ===
No.	Portrait	Minister	Took office	Left office	Time in office	Party	Monarch
32	Antonio Paulino Limpo de AbreuViscount of Abaeté	Antonio Paulino Limpo de Abreu; Viscount of Abaeté (1798–1883)	24 July 1840	23 March 1841	242 days	Conservative	Pedro II of Brazil
33	Paulino Soares de Sousa1st Viscount of Uruguai	Paulino Soares de Sousa; 1st Viscount of Uruguai (1807–1866)	23 March 1841	20 January 1843	1 year, 303 days	Conservative	Pedro II of Brazil
34	[[Honório Hermeto Carneiro Leão, Marquis of ParanáHonório Hermeto Carneiro Leão]]Marquis of Paraná	[[Honório Hermeto Carneiro Leão, Marquis of Paraná; Honório Hermeto Carneiro Leão]] Marquis of Paraná (1801–1856)	20 January 1843	2 February 1844	1 year, 13 days	Conservative	Pedro II of Brazil
35	Manuel Alves Branco2nd Viscount of Caravelas	Manuel Alves Branco; 2nd Viscount of Caravelas (1797–1855)	2 February 1844	23 May 1844	111 days	Liberal	Pedro II of Brazil
36	Manuel Antônio Galvão	Manuel Antônio Galvão (1791–1850)	23 May 1844	26 May 1845	1 year, 3 days	Conservative	Pedro II of Brazil
37	José Carlos Pereira de Almeida TorresViscount of Macaé	José Carlos Pereira de Almeida Torres; Viscount of Macaé (1799–1850)	26 May 1845	29 September 1845	126 days	Liberal	Pedro II of Brazil
38	Antonio Paulino Limpo de AbreuViscount of Abaeté	Antonio Paulino Limpo de Abreu; Viscount of Abaeté (1798–1883)	29 September 1845	2 May 1846	215 days	Conservative	Pedro II of Brazil
39	Joaquim Marcelino de Brito	Joaquim Marcelino de Brito (1799–1879)	2 May 1846	5 May 1846	3 days	Conservative	Pedro II of Brazil
40	José Joaquim Fernandes Torres	José Joaquim Fernandes Torres (1797–1869)	5 May 1846	17 May 1847	1 year, 12 days	Liberal	Pedro II of Brazil
41	Caetano Lopes GamaViscount of Maranguape	Caetano Lopes Gama; Viscount of Maranguape (1795–1864)	17 May 1847	22 May 1847	5 days	Conservative	Pedro II of Brazil

No.	Portrait	Minister	Took office	Left office	Time in office	Party	Prime Minister
42	Nicolau Pereira de Campos Vergueiro	Nicolau Pereira de Campos Vergueiro (1778–1859)	22 May 1847	1 January 1848	224 days	Liberal	Manuel Alves Branco, 2nd Viscount of Caravelas (Liberal)
43	Saturnino de Sousa e Oliveira Coutinho	Saturnino de Sousa e Oliveira Coutinho (1803–1848)	1 January 1848	29 January 1848	28 days	Conservative	Manuel Alves Branco, 2nd Viscount of Caravelas (Liberal)
44	José Antônio Pimenta BuenoMarquis of São Vicente	José Antônio Pimenta Bueno; Marquis of São Vicente (1803–1878)	29 January 1848	31 May 1848	123 days	Conservative	Manuel Alves Branco, 2nd Viscount of Caravelas (Liberal); José Carlos Pereira de Almeida Torres, Viscount of Macaé (Liberal)
45	Antônio Manuel de Campos Melo	Antônio Manuel de Campos Melo (1809–1878)	31 May 1848	29 September 1848	121 days	Liberal	Francisco de Paula Sousa e Melo (Liberal)
46	Eusébio de Queirós	Eusébio de Queirós (1812–1868)	29 September 1848	11 May 1852	3 years, 225 days	Conservative	Pedro de Araújo Lima, Marquis of Olinda (Conservative); José da Costa Carvalho, Marquis of Monte Alegre (Conservative)
47	José Ildefonso de Sousa RamosViscount of Jaguari	José Ildefonso de Sousa Ramos; Viscount of Jaguari (1812–1883)	11 May 1852	14 June 1853	1 year, 34 days	Conservative	Joaquim Rodrigues Torres, Viscount of Itaboraí (Conservative)
48	Luís Antônio Barbosa	Luís Antônio Barbosa (1805–1860)	14 June 1853	6 September 1853	84 days	Conservative	Joaquim Rodrigues Torres, Viscount of Itaboraí (Conservative)
49	José Tomás Nabuco de Araújo	José Tomás Nabuco de Araújo (1813–1878)	6 September 1853	4 May 1857	3 years, 240 days	Liberal	Honório Hermeto Carneiro Leão, Marquis of Paraná (Conservative); Luís Alves de Lima e Silva, Duke of Caxias (Conservative)
50	Francisco Diogo Pereira de Vasconcellos	Francisco Diogo Pereira de Vasconcellos (1812–1863)	4 May 1857	12 December 1858	1 year, 222 days	Conservative	Pedro de Araújo Lima, Marquis of Olinda (Conservative)
51	José Tomás Nabuco de Araújo	José Tomás Nabuco de Araújo (1813–1878)	12 December 1858	21 March 1859	99 days	Liberal	Antonio Paulino Limpo de Abreu, Viscount of Abaeté (Conservative)
52	Manuel Vieira TostaMarquis of Muritiba	Manuel Vieira Tosta; Marquis of Muritiba (1807–1896)	21 March 1859	10 August 1859	142 days	Liberal	Antonio Paulino Limpo de Abreu, Viscount of Abaeté (Conservative)
53	João Lustosa da Cunha ParanaguáMarquis of Paranaguá	João Lustosa da Cunha Paranaguá; Marquis of Paranaguá (1821–1912)	10 August 1859	3 March 1861	1 year, 205 days	Liberal	Ângelo Moniz da Silva Ferraz, Baron of Uruguaiana (Conservative)
54	Francisco de Paula Negreiros de Saião LobatoViscount of Niterói	Francisco de Paula Negreiros de Saião Lobato; Viscount of Niterói (1815–1884)	3 March 1861	24 May 1862	1 year, 82 days	Conservative	Luís Alves de Lima e Silva, Duke of Caxias (Conservative)
55	Francisco José Furtado	Francisco José Furtado (1818–1870)	24 May 1862	30 May 1862	6 days	Liberal	Zacarias de Góis e Vasconcelos (Progressive League)
56	Caetano Maria Lopes GamaViscount of Maranguape	Caetano Maria Lopes Gama; Viscount of Maranguape (1795–1864)	30 May 1862	2 June 1863	1 year, 3 days	Conservative	Pedro de Araújo Lima, Marquis of Olinda (Progressive League)
57	João Lins CansançãoViscount of Sinimbu	João Lins Cansanção; Viscount of Sinimbu (1810–1906)	2 June 1863	15 January 1864	227 days	Liberal	Pedro de Araújo Lima, Marquis of Olinda (Progressive League)
58	Zacarias de Góis e Vasconcelos	Zacarias de Góis e Vasconcelos (1815–1877)	15 January 1864	31 August 1864	229 days	Progressive League	Zacarias de Góis e Vasconcelos (Progressive League)
59	Francisco José Furtado	Francisco José Furtado (1818–1870)	31 August 1864	12 May 1865	254 days	Liberal	Francisco José Furtado (Liberal)
60	José Tomás Nabuco de Araújo	José Tomás Nabuco de Araújo (1813–1878)	12 May 1865	3 August 1866	1 year, 83 days	Liberal	Pedro de Araújo Lima, Marquis of Olinda (Liberal)
61	João Lustosa da Cunha ParanaguáMarquis of Paranaguá	João Lustosa da Cunha Paranaguá; Marquis of Paranaguá (1821–1912)	3 August 1866	27 October 1866	85 days	Liberal	Zacarias de Góis e Vasconcelos (Liberal)
62	Martim Francisco Ribeiro de Andrada	Martim Francisco Ribeiro de Andrada (1825–1886)	27 October 1866	16 July 1868	1 year, 263 days	Conservative	Zacarias de Góis e Vasconcelos (Liberal)
63	José de Alencar	José de Alencar (1829–1877)	16 July 1868	10 January 1870	1 year, 178 days	Conservative	Joaquim Rodrigues Torres, Viscount of Itaboraí (Conservative)
64	Joaquim Otávio Nébias	Joaquim Otávio Nébias (1811–1872)	10 January 1870	9 June 1870	150 days	Conservative	Joaquim Rodrigues Torres, Viscount of Itaboraí (Conservative)
65	Manuel Vieira TostaMarquis of Muritiba	Manuel Vieira Tosta; Marquis of Muritiba (1807–1896)	9 June 1870	29 September 1870	112 days	Liberal	Joaquim Rodrigues Torres, Viscount of Itaboraí (Conservative)
66	José Ildefonso de Sousa RamosViscount of Jaguari	José Ildefonso de Sousa Ramos; Viscount of Jaguari (1812–1883)	29 September 1870	7 March 1871	159 days	Conservative	José Antônio Pimenta Bueno, Marquis of São Vicente (Conservative)
67	Francisco de Paula Negreiros de Saião LobatoViscount of Niterói	Francisco de Paula Negreiros de Saião Lobato; Viscount of Niterói (1815–1884)	7 March 1871	20 April 1872	1 year, 44 days	Conservative	José Paranhos, Baron of Rio Branco (Conservative)
68	Manuel Antônio Duarte de Azevedo	Manuel Antônio Duarte de Azevedo (1831–1912)	20 April 1872	25 June 1875	3 years, 66 days	Conservative	José Paranhos, Baron of Rio Branco (Conservative)
69	Diogo Cavalcanti de AlbuquerqueViscount of Cavalcanti	Diogo Cavalcanti de Albuquerque; Viscount of Cavalcanti (1829–1899)	25 June 1875	15 February 1877	1 year, 235 days	Conservative	Luís Alves de Lima e Silva, Duke of Caxias (Conservative)
70	Francisco Januário da Gama Cerqueira	Francisco Januário da Gama Cerqueira (1827–1889)	15 February 1877	5 January 1878	324 days	Liberal	Luís Alves de Lima e Silva, Duke of Caxias (Conservative)
71	Lafayette Rodrigues Pereira	Lafayette Rodrigues Pereira (1834–1917)	5 January 1878	28 March 1880	2 years, 83 days	Liberal	João Lins Cansanção, Viscount of Sinimbu (Liberal)
72	Manuel Pinto de Sousa Dantas	Manuel Pinto de Sousa Dantas (1831–1894)	28 March 1880	21 January 1882	1 year, 299 days	Liberal	José Antônio Saraiva (Liberal)
73	Rodolfo Epifânio de Sousa Dantas	Rodolfo Epifânio de Sousa Dantas (1854–1901)	21 January 1882	1 February 1882	11 days	Liberal	Martinho Álvares da Silva Campos (Liberal)
74	Manuel da Silva Mafra	Manuel da Silva Mafra (1831–1907)	1 February 1882	3 July 1882	152 days	Liberal	Martinho Álvares da Silva Campos (Liberal)
75	João Ferreira de Moura	João Ferreira de Moura (1830–1912)	3 July 1882	24 May 1883	325 days	Conservative	João Lustosa da Cunha Paranaguá, Marquis of Paranaguá (Liberal)
76	Francisco Prisco de Sousa Paraíso	Francisco Prisco de Sousa Paraíso (1840–1895)	24 May 1883	6 June 1884	1 year, 13 days	Liberal	Lafayette Rodrigues Pereira (Liberal)
77	Francisco Maria Sodré Pereira	Francisco Maria Sodré Pereira (1839–1903)	6 June 1884	6 May 1885	334 days	Conservative	Manuel Pinto de Sousa Dantas (Liberal)
78	Afonso Pena	Afonso Pena (1847–1909)	6 May 1885	20 August 1885	106 days	Liberal	José Antônio Saraiva (Liberal)
79	Joaquim Delfino Ribeiro da Luz	Joaquim Delfino Ribeiro da Luz (1824–1903)	20 August 1885	10 May 1887	1 year, 263 days	Conservative	João Maurício Vanderlei, Baron of Cotegipe (Conservative)
80	Samuel Wallace MacDowell III	Samuel Wallace MacDowell III (1843–1908)	10 May 1887	10 March 1888	305 days	Conservative	João Maurício Vanderlei, Baron of Cotegipe (Conservative)
81	Antônio Ferreira Viana	Antônio Ferreira Viana (1833–1903)	10 March 1888	4 January 1889	300 days	Conservative	João Alfredo Correia de Oliveira (Conservative)
82	Francisco de Assis Rosa e Silva	Francisco de Assis Rosa e Silva (1857–1929)	4 January 1889	7 June 1889	154 days	Conservative	João Alfredo Correia de Oliveira (Conservative)
83	Cândido Maria de Oliveira	Cândido Maria de Oliveira (1845–1919)	7 June 1889	15 November 1889	161 days	Liberal	Afonso Celso, Viscount of Ouro Preto (Liberal)

== Republican period ==
=== First Brazilian Republic ===
No.	Portrait	Minister	Took office	Left office	Time in office	Party	President
–	Ruy Barbosa	Ruy Barbosa (1849–1923); Acting	15 November 1889	18 November 1889	3 days	PRP	Deodoro da Fonseca (Ind)
1	Campos Sales	Campos Sales (1841–1913)	18 November 1889	22 January 1891	1 year, 65 days	PRP	Deodoro da Fonseca (Ind)
2	Henrique Pereira de Lucena	Henrique Pereira de Lucena (1835–1913); Acting	22 January 1891	22 May 1891	120 days	PR Federal	Deodoro da Fonseca (Ind)
3	Antônio Luís Afonso de Carvalho	Antônio Luís Afonso de Carvalho (1828–1892)	22 May 1891	23 November 1891	184 days	PR Federal	Floriano Peixoto (Ind)
–	José Higino Duarte Pereira	José Higino Duarte Pereira (1847–1901); Acting	23 November 1891	10 February 1892	79 days	Independent	Floriano Peixoto (Ind)
4	Fernando Lobo Leite Pereira	Fernando Lobo Leite Pereira (1851–1918)	10 February 1892	8 December 1893	1 year, 301 days	PR Federal	Floriano Peixoto (Ind)
5	Alexandre Cassiano do Nascimento	Alexandre Cassiano do Nascimento (1856–1912)	8 December 1893	15 November 1894	342 days	PRR	Floriano Peixoto (Ind)
6	Antônio Gonçalves Ferreira	Antônio Gonçalves Ferreira (1846–1931)	15 November 1894	30 August 1896	1 year, 289 days	PR	Prudente de Morais (PR Federal)
7	Alberto Torres	Alberto Torres (1865–1917)	30 August 1896	7 January 1897	130 days	PRF	Prudente de Morais (PR Federal)
8	Bernardino de Campos	Bernardino de Campos (1841–1915)	7 January 1897	19 January 1897	10 days	PRP	Prudente de Morais (PR Federal)
9	Amaro Cavalcanti	Amaro Cavalcanti (1849–1922)	17 January 1897	15 November 1898	1 year, 302 days	PR Federal	Prudente de Morais (PR Federal)
10	Epitácio Pessoa	Epitácio Pessoa (1865–1942)	15 November 1898	6 August 1901	2 years, 264 days	PRM	Campos Sales (PRP)
11	Sabino Barroso	Sabino Barroso (1859–1919)	6 August 1901	15 November 1902	1 year, 101 days	PRM	Campos Sales (PRP)
12	J. J. Seabra	J. J. Seabra (1855–1942)	15 November 1902	28 May 1906	3 years, 194 days	PR	Rodrigues Alves (PRP)
13	Félix Gaspar	Félix Gaspar (1865–1907)	28 May 1906	15 November 1906	171 days	Independent	Rodrigues Alves (PRP)
14	Augusto Tavares de Lira	Augusto Tavares de Lira (1872–1958)	15 November 1906	18 June 1909	2 years, 215 days	PRC	Afonso Pena (PRM); Nilo Peçanha (PRF)
15	Esmeraldino Bandeira	Esmeraldino Bandeira (1865–1928)	18 June 1909	15 November 1910	1 year, 150 days	PRF	Nilo Peçanha (PRF)
16	Rivadávia Correia	Rivadávia Correia (1866–1920)	15 November 1910	12 August 1913	2 years, 270 days	PRF	Hermes da Fonseca (PRC)
17	Herculano de Freitas	Herculano de Freitas (1865–1926)	12 August 1913	15 November 1914	1 year, 95 days	PRP	Hermes da Fonseca (PRC)
18	Carlos Maximiliano	Carlos Maximiliano (1873–1960)	15 November 1914	15 November 1918	4 years, 0 days	PRR	Venceslau Brás (PRM)
19	Amaro Cavalcanti	Amaro Cavalcanti (1849–1922)	15 November 1918	21 November 1918	6 days	PRF	Delfim Moreira (PRM)
20	Urbano Santos	Urbano Santos (1859–1922)	21 November 1918	28 July 1919	249 days	PRM	Delfim Moreira (PRM)
21	Alfredo Pinto	Alfredo Pinto (1863–1923)	28 July 1919	3 September 1921	2 years, 37 days	Independent	Epitácio Pessoa (PRM)
22	Joaquim Ferreira Chaves	Joaquim Ferreira Chaves (1852–1937)	3 September 1921	15 November 1922	1 year, 73 days	PR Federal	Epitácio Pessoa (PRM)
23	João Luís Alves	João Luís Alves (1870–1925)	15 November 1922	20 January 1925	2 years, 66 days	PRP	Artur Bernardes (PRM)
24	Aníbal Freire da Fonseca	Aníbal Freire da Fonseca (1884–1970)	20 January 1925	5 February 1925	16 days	PRF	Artur Bernardes (PRM)
25	Afonso Pena Júnior	Afonso Pena Júnior (1879–1968)	5 February 1925	15 November 1926	1 year, 283 days	PRF	Artur Bernardes (PRM)
26	Augusto Viana do Castelo	Augusto Viana do Castelo (1874–1953)	15 November 1926	24 October 1930	3 years, 343 days	PRF	Washington Luís (PRP)

=== Vargas Era ===
No.	Portrait	Minister	Took office	Left office	Time in office	President
27	Gabriel Loureiro Bernardes	Gabriel Loureiro Bernardes (1890–1935)	24 October 1930	26 October 1930	2 days	Military Junta of 1930
28	Afrânio de Melo Franco	Afrânio de Melo Franco (1870–1943)	26 October 1930	3 November 1930	8 days	Getúlio Vargas
29	Oswaldo Aranha	Oswaldo Aranha (1894–1960)	3 November 1930	21 December 1931	1 year, 48 days	Getúlio Vargas
30	Maurício Cardoso	Maurício Cardoso (1888–1938)	21 December 1931	4 March 1932	74 days	Getúlio Vargas
31	Francisco Campos	Francisco Campos (1891–1968)	4 March 1932	17 September 1932	197 days	Getúlio Vargas
32	Afrânio de Melo Franco	Afrânio de Melo Franco (1870–1943)	17 September 1932	7 November 1932	51 days	Getúlio Vargas
33	Francisco Antunes Maciel Júnior	Francisco Antunes Maciel Júnior (1879–1966)	7 November 1932	24 July 1934	1 year, 259 days	Getúlio Vargas
34	Vicente Rao	Vicente Rao (1892–1978)	24 July 1934	7 January 1937	2 years, 167 days	Getúlio Vargas
35	Agamenon Magalhães	Agamenon Magalhães (1893–1952)	7 January 1937	3 June 1937	147 days	Getúlio Vargas
36	José Carlos de Macedo Soares	José Carlos de Macedo Soares (1883–1968)	3 June 1937	10 November 1937	160 days	Getúlio Vargas
37	Francisco Campos	Francisco Campos (1891–1968)	10 November 1937	17 July 1942	4 years, 249 days	Getúlio Vargas
38	Marcondes Filho	Marcondes Filho (1892–1974)	17 July 1942	23 February 1943	221 days	Getúlio Vargas
39	Fernando Antunes	Fernando Antunes (1887–1950)	23 February 1943	27 March 1943	32 days	Getúlio Vargas
40	Marcondes Filho	Marcondes Filho (1892–1974)	27 March 1943	3 March 1945	1 year, 341 days	Getúlio Vargas
41	Agamenon Magalhães	Agamenon Magalhães (1893–1952)	3 March 1945	29 October 1945	240 days	Getúlio Vargas
42	Antônio de Sampaio Dória	Antônio de Sampaio Dória (1883–1964)	29 October 1945	31 January 1946	94 days	José Linhares

=== Fourth Brazilian Republic ===
No.	Portrait	Minister	Took office	Left office	Time in office	Party	President
43	Carlos Luz	Carlos Luz (1894–1961)	31 January 1946	2 October 1946	244 days	PSD	Eurico Gaspar Dutra (PSD)
44	Benedito Costa Neto	Benedito Costa Neto (1895–1981)	2 October 1946	7 November 1947	1 year, 36 days	PSD	Eurico Gaspar Dutra (PSD)
45	Adroaldo Costa	Adroaldo Costa (1894–1985)	7 November 1947	1 April 1950	2 years, 145 days	PSD	Eurico Gaspar Dutra (PSD)
46	Honório Fernandes Monteiro	Honório Fernandes Monteiro (1894–1968)	1 April 1950	29 June 1950	89 days	PSD	Eurico Gaspar Dutra (PSD)
47	Junqueira Ayres	Junqueira Ayres (1895–1972)	29 June 1950	4 August 1950	36 days	PSD	Eurico Gaspar Dutra (PSD)
48	José Francisco Bias Fortes	José Francisco Bias Fortes (1891–1971)	4 August 1950	31 January 1951	180 days	PSD	Eurico Gaspar Dutra (PSD)
49	Francisco Negrão de Lima	Francisco Negrão de Lima (1901–1981)	31 January 1951	26 June 1953	2 years, 146 days	PSD	Getúlio Vargas (PTB)
50	Tancredo Neves	Tancredo Neves (1910–1985)	26 June 1953	24 August 1954	1 year, 62 days	PSD	Getúlio Vargas (PTB)
51	Miguel Seabra Fagundes	Miguel Seabra Fagundes (1910–1993)	24 August 1954	14 February 1955	174 days	Independent	Café Filho (PSP)
52	Marcondes Filho	Marcondes Filho (1892–1974)	14 February 1955	18 April 1955	63 days	PTB	Café Filho (PSP)
53	Prado Kelly	Prado Kelly (1904–1986)	18 April 1955	11 November 1955	207 days	UDN	Café Filho (PSP)
54	Francisco de Menezes Pimentel	Francisco de Menezes Pimentel (1887–1973)	11 November 1955	31 January 1956	81 days	PTB	Nereu Ramos (PSD)
55	Nereu Ramos	Nereu Ramos (1888–1958)	31 January 1956	4 November 1957	1 year, 277 days	PSD	Juscelino Kubitschek (PSD)
56	Eurico Sales	Eurico Sales (1910–1959)	4 November 1957	8 July 1958	246 days	PSD	Juscelino Kubitschek (PSD)
57	Cirilo Júnior	Cirilo Júnior (1886–1965)	8 July 1958	31 July 1959	1 year, 23 days	PSD	Juscelino Kubitschek (PSD)
58	Armando Falcão	Armando Falcão (1919–2010)	31 July 1959	31 January 1961	1 year, 184 days	PSD	Juscelino Kubitschek (PSD)
59	Oscar Pedro Horta	Oscar Pedro Horta (1908–1975)	31 January 1961	25 August 1961	206 days	PSP	Jânio Quadros (PTN)
60	José Martins Rodrigues	José Martins Rodrigues (1901–1976)	25 August 1961	8 September 1961	14 days	PSD	Ranieri Mazzilli (PSD)

No.	Portrait	Minister	Took office	Left office	Time in office	Party	Prime Minister
–	Tancredo Neves	Tancredo Neves (1910–1985); Acting	8 September 1961	12 October 1961	34 days	PSD	Tancredo Neves (PSD)
61	Alfredo Nasser	Alfredo Nasser (1907–1965)	12 October 1961	12 July 1962	273 days	PSP	Tancredo Neves (PSD)

No.	Portrait	Minister	Took office	Left office	Time in office	Party	President
62	João Mangabeira	João Mangabeira (1880–1964)	24 January 1963	7 June 1963	134 days	PSB	João Goulart (PTB)
63	Carlos Molinari Cairoli	Carlos Molinari Cairoli (1917–2006)	7 June 1963	18 June 1963	11 days	Independent	João Goulart (PTB)
64	Abelardo Jurema	Abelardo Jurema (1914–1999)	18 June 1963	31 March 1964	287 days	PSD	João Goulart (PTB)

=== Military Dictatorship (Fifth Brazilian Republic) ===
No.	Portrait	Minister	Took office	Left office	Time in office	Party	President
65	Luís Antônio da Gama e Silva	Luís Antônio da Gama e Silva (1913–1979)	4 April 1964	15 April 1964	11 days	UDN	Ranieri Mazzilli (PSD)
66	Milton Campos	Milton Campos (1900–1972)	15 April 1964	11 October 1965	1 year, 179 days	UDN	Castelo Branco (Military dictatorship)
67	Luís Viana Filho	Luís Viana Filho (1908–1990)	11 October 1965	19 October 1965	8 days	ARENA	Castelo Branco (ARENA)
68	Juracy Magalhães	Juracy Magalhães (1905–2001)	19 October 1965	14 January 1966	87 days	ARENA	Castelo Branco (ARENA)
69	Mem de Azambuja Sá	Mem de Azambuja Sá (1905–1989)	14 January 1966	28 June 1966	165 days	ARENA	Castelo Branco (ARENA)
70	Luís Viana Filho	Luís Viana Filho (1908–1990)	28 June 1966	19 July 1966	21 days	ARENA	Castelo Branco (ARENA)
71	Carlos Medeiros	Carlos Medeiros (1907–1983)	19 July 1966	15 March 1967	239 days	ARENA	Castelo Branco (ARENA)
72	Luís Antônio da Gama e Silva	Luís Antônio da Gama e Silva (1913–1979)	15 March 1967	30 October 1969	2 years, 229 days	ARENA	Costa e Silva (ARENA); Military Junta of 1969 (Military junta)
73	Alfredo Buzaid	Alfredo Buzaid (1914–1991)	30 October 1969	15 March 1974	4 years, 136 days	ARENA	Emílio Garrastazu Médici (ARENA)
74	Armando Falcão	Armando Falcão (1919–2010)	15 March 1974	15 March 1979	5 years, 0 days	ARENA	Ernesto Geisel (ARENA)
75	Petrônio Portella	Petrônio Portella (1925–1980)	15 March 1979	6 January 1980	297 days	ARENA	João Figueiredo (ARENA)
76	Golbery do Couto e Silva	Golbery do Couto e Silva (1911–1987)	6 January 1980	9 January 1980	3 days	ARENA	João Figueiredo (ARENA)
77	Ibrahim Abi-Ackel	Ibrahim Abi-Ackel (born 1926)	9 January 1980	15 March 1985	5 years, 65 days	PDS	João Figueiredo (PDS)

=== Sixth Brazilian Republic ===
No.	Portrait	Minister	Took office	Left office	Time in office	Party	President
78	Fernando Lyra	Fernando Lyra (1938–2013)	15 March 1985	14 February 1986	336 days	MDB	José Sarney (MDB)
79	Paulo Brossard	Paulo Brossard (1924–2015)	14 February 1986	19 January 1989	2 years, 340 days	MDB	José Sarney (MDB)
80	Oscar Dias Correia	Oscar Dias Correia (1921–2005)	19 January 1989	9 August 1989	202 days	Independent	José Sarney (MDB)
81	Saulo Ramos	Saulo Ramos (1929–2013)	9 August 1989	15 March 1990	218 days	Independent	José Sarney (MDB)
82	Bernardo Cabral	Bernardo Cabral (born 1932)	15 March 1990	13 October 1990	212 days	MDB	Fernando Collor (PRN)
83	Jarbas Passarinho	Jarbas Passarinho (1920–2016)	13 October 1990	2 April 1992	1 year, 172 days	PDS	Fernando Collor (PRN)
84	Célio Borja	Célio Borja (1928–2022)	2 April 1992	2 October 1992	183 days	PDS	Fernando Collor (PRN)
85	Maurício Corrêa	Maurício Corrêa (1934–2012)	2 October 1992	5 April 1994	1 year, 185 days	PSDB	Itamar Franco (MDB)
86	Alexandre Dupeyrat	Alexandre Dupeyrat (born 1944)	5 April 1994	1 January 1995	271 days	Independent	Itamar Franco (MDB)
87	Nelson Jobim	Nelson Jobim (born 1946)	1 January 1995	8 April 1997	2 years, 97 days	MDB	Fernando Henrique Cardoso (PSDB)
88	Milton Seligman	Milton Seligman (born 1951)	8 April 1997	22 May 1997	44 days	MDB	Fernando Henrique Cardoso (PSDB)
89	Iris Rezende	Iris Rezende (1933–2021)	22 May 1997	1 April 1998	314 days	MDB	Fernando Henrique Cardoso (PSDB)
90	José de Jesus Filho	José de Jesus Filho (1927–2021)	1 April 1998	7 April 1998	6 days	Independent	Fernando Henrique Cardoso (PSDB)
91	Renan Calheiros	Renan Calheiros (born 1955)	7 April 1998	19 July 1999	1 year, 103 days	MDB	Fernando Henrique Cardoso (PSDB)
92	José Carlos Dias	José Carlos Dias (born 1939)	19 July 1999	14 April 2000	270 days	Independent	Fernando Henrique Cardoso (PSDB)
93	José Gregori	José Gregori (1930–2023)	14 April 2000	14 November 2001	1 year, 214 days	MDB	Fernando Henrique Cardoso (PSDB)
94	Aloysio Nunes	Aloysio Nunes (born 1945)	14 November 2001	3 April 2002	140 days	PSDB	Fernando Henrique Cardoso (PSDB)
95	Miguel Reale Júnior	Miguel Reale Júnior (born 1944)	3 April 2002	10 July 2002	98 days	PSDB	Fernando Henrique Cardoso (PSDB)
96	Paulo de Tarso Ramos Ribeiro	Paulo de Tarso Ramos Ribeiro (born 1959)	10 July 2002	1 January 2003	175 days	Independent	Fernando Henrique Cardoso (PSDB)
97	Márcio Thomaz Bastos	Márcio Thomaz Bastos (1935–2014)	1 January 2003	16 March 2007	4 years, 74 days	Independent	Luiz Inácio Lula da Silva (PT)
98	Tarso Genro	Tarso Genro (born 1947)	16 March 2007	10 February 2010	2 years, 331 days	PT	Luiz Inácio Lula da Silva (PT)
99	Luiz Paulo Barreto	Luiz Paulo Barreto (born 1964)	10 February 2010	1 January 2011	325 days	Independent	Luiz Inácio Lula da Silva (PT)
100	José Eduardo Cardozo	José Eduardo Cardozo (born 1959)	1 January 2011	3 March 2016	5 years, 62 days	PT	Dilma Rousseff (PT)
101	Wellington Lima e Silva	Wellington Lima e Silva (born 1966)	3 March 2016	14 March 2016	11 days	Independent	Dilma Rousseff (PT)
102	Eugênio Aragão	Eugênio Aragão (born 1959)	14 March 2016	12 May 2016	59 days	Independent	Dilma Rousseff (PT)
103	Alexandre de Moraes	Alexandre de Moraes (born 1968)	12 May 2016	7 February 2017	271 days	PSDB	Michel Temer (MDB)
–	José Levi do Amaral	José Levi do Amaral (born 1976); Acting	7 February 2017	7 March 2017	28 days	Independent	Michel Temer (MDB)
104	Osmar Serraglio	Osmar Serraglio (born 1948)	7 March 2017	31 May 2017	85 days	MDB	Michel Temer (MDB)
105	Torquato Jardim	Torquato Jardim (born 1949)	31 May 2017	1 January 2019	1 year, 215 days	Independent	Michel Temer (MDB)
106	Sergio Moro	Sergio Moro (born 1972)	1 January 2019	24 April 2020	1 year, 114 days	Independent	Jair Bolsonaro (PSL)
107	André Mendonça	André Mendonça (born 1972)	29 April 2020	29 March 2021	334 days	Independent	Jair Bolsonaro (Ind)
108	Anderson Torres	Anderson Torres (born 1976)	29 March 2021	1 January 2023	1 year, 278 days	UNIÃO	Jair Bolsonaro (PL)
109	Flávio Dino	Flávio Dino (born 1968)	1 January 2023	1 February 2024	1 year, 31 days	PSB	Luiz Inácio Lula da Silva (PT)
110	Ricardo Lewandowski	Ricardo Lewandowski (born 1946)	1 February 2024	9 January 2026	1 year, 342 days	Independent	Luiz Inácio Lula da Silva (PT)
111	Wellington Lima e Silva	Wellington Lima e Silva (born 1966)	15 January 2026	Incumbent	235 days	Independent	Luiz Inácio Lula da Silva (PT)
