= List of prime ministers of Brazil =

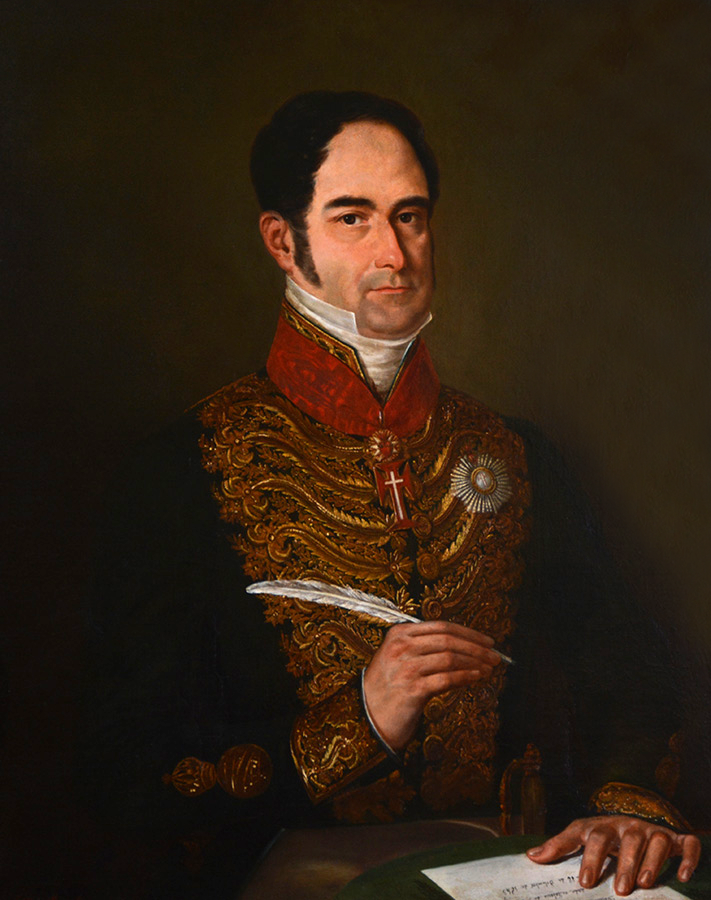
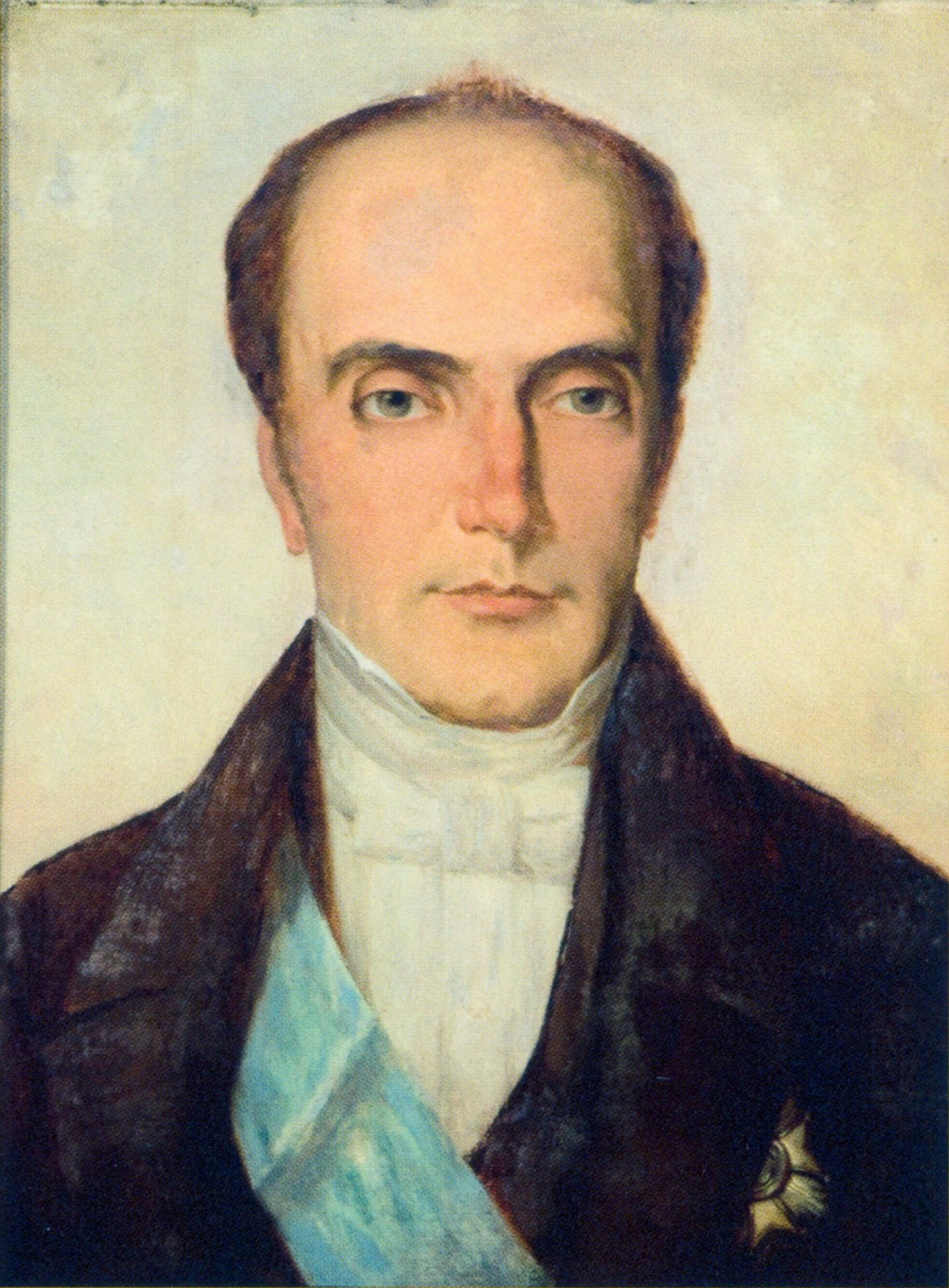
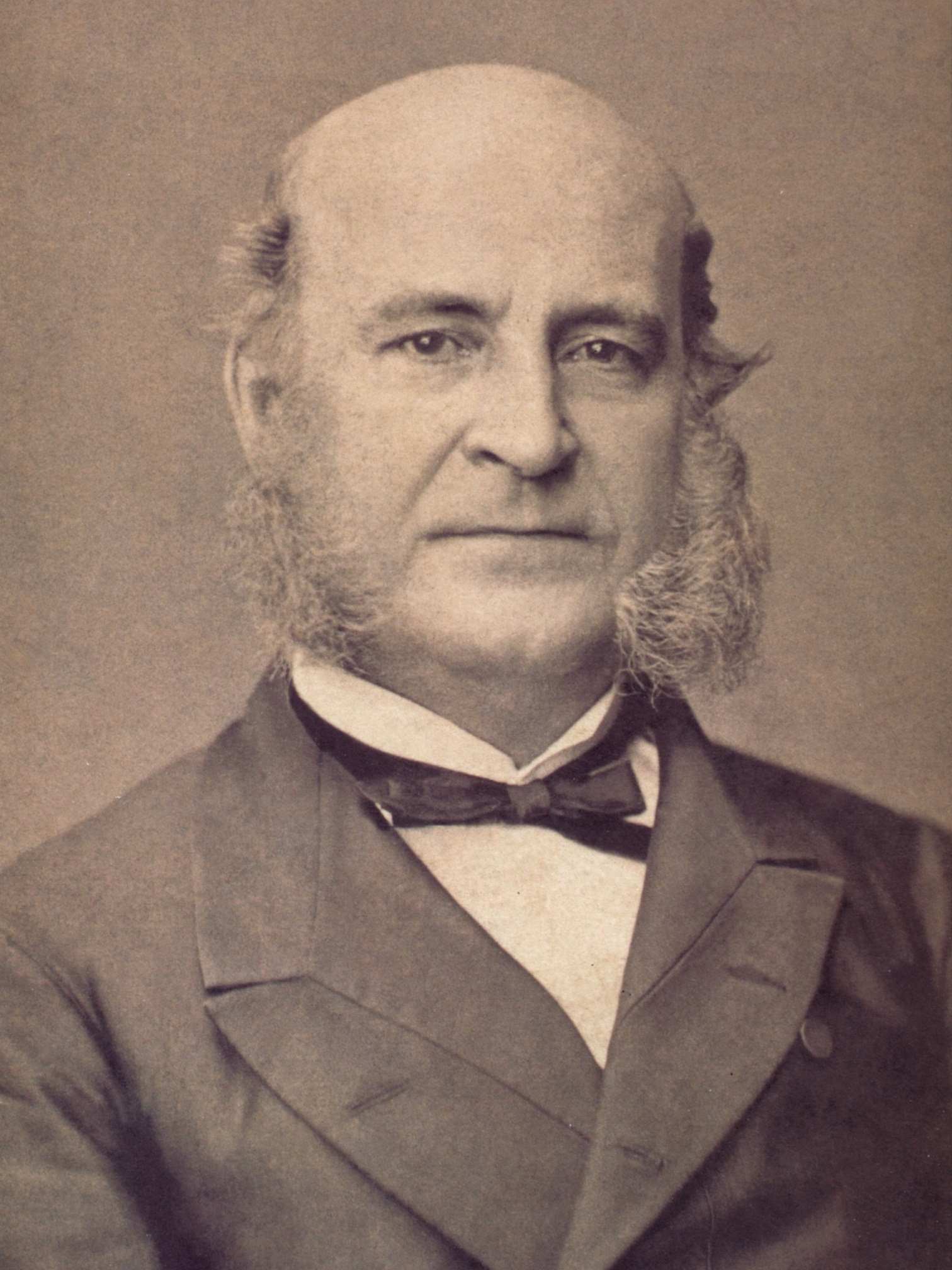
- Top left: Manuel Alves Branco was the first de jure prime minister of the Empire of Brazil.
- Top right: Pedro de Araújo Lima was the longest-serving prime minister in Brazilian history.
- Bottom left: José Paranhos was the longest uninterrupted serving prime minister, holding office from 1871 to 1875.
- Bottom right: Hermes Lima was the last person to hold the office of prime minister of Brazil during the Fourth Brazilian Republic.

The prime ministers of Brazil, officially called President of the Council of Ministers, were the parliamentarians who, during two periods in the political history of the country, directed the government in a parliamentary system. The first parliamentary experience began with emperor Pedro II in 1847, and was maintained during the last 42 years of the Empire of Brazil. The first de jure officeholder was Manuel Alves Branco, Viscount of Caravelas, who was sworn in on 20 July 1847 after the office was formally created by Decree No. 523. The prime ministers were appointed by the emperor of Brazil. Once chosen, it was up to them to form a cabinet.

The second occasion on which a parliamentary system was put into practice occurred during the government of president João Goulart, in 1961, due to a constitutional amendment approved by his opponents before the beginning of his term. This second parliamentary experience was short-lived, with the presidential system of government restored in a national plebiscite in 1963.

== Prime ministers of Brazil ==
=== Prime ministers of the Empire of Brazil (1847–1889) ===
Between 1847 and 1889, the holder of the office was officially called "President of the Council of Ministers", being referred to by the press usually as "President of the Cabinet". According to the constitution, the head of the Executive Power was the Emperor.

The position of President of the Council of Ministers was created by Decree No. 523 of 20 July 1847, and this parliamentary regime was never included in the Imperial Constitution. The ministerial offices that existed from 1840 to 1847 did not have a President of the council. The number of ministers was small by current Brazilian standards: there were six, and in 1860 the seventh ministry was created by Legislative Decree No. 1,067 of 28 July 1860, the Secretary of State for Agriculture, Commerce and Public Works.

The duration of the Cabinet depended on the support it had in the Chamber of Deputies and on the support of the Emperor. If the Chamber of Deputies were incompatible with the Cabinet, it was up to the Emperor to either dissolve the Cabinet or dissolve the Chamber. There were, in all, 32 cabinets with the figure of the President of the Council of Ministers.

No.	Portrait	Prime Minister	Took office	Left office	Time in office	Party	Monarch	Cabinet
1	Manuel Alves Branco2nd Viscount of Caravelas	Manuel Alves Branco; 2nd Viscount of Caravelas (1797–1855)	20 July 1847	8 March 1848	232 days	Liberal	Pedro II	Alves Branco
2	José de Almeida TorresViscount of Macaé	José de Almeida Torres; Viscount of Macaé (1799–1850)	8 March 1848	31 May 1848	84 days	Liberal	Pedro II	Macaé
3	Francisco de Paula Sousa e Melo	Francisco de Paula Sousa e Melo (1791–1851)	31 May 1848	28 September 1848	120 days	Liberal	Pedro II	Paula Sousa
4	Pedro de Araújo LimaViscount of Olinda	Pedro de Araújo Lima; Viscount of Olinda (1793–1870)	28 September 1848	8 October 1849	1 year, 10 days	Conservative	Pedro II	Olinda I
5	José da Costa CarvalhoMarquess of Monte Alegre	José da Costa Carvalho; Marquess of Monte Alegre (1796–1860)	8 October 1849	11 May 1852	2 years, 216 days	Conservative	Pedro II	Monte Alegre
6	Joaquim Rodrigues TorresViscount of Itaboraí	Joaquim Rodrigues Torres; Viscount of Itaboraí (1802–1872)	11 May 1852	6 September 1853	1 year, 118 days	Conservative	Pedro II	Itaboraí I
7	Honório Hermeto Carneiro LeãoMarquess of Paraná	Honório Hermeto Carneiro Leão; Marquess of Paraná (1801–1856)	6 September 1853	3 September 1856	2 years, 363 days	Conservative	Pedro II	Paraná
8	Luís Alves de Lima e SilvaMarquess of Caxias	Luís Alves de Lima e Silva; Marquess of Caxias (1803–1880)	3 September 1856	4 May 1857	243 days	Conservative	Pedro II	Caxias I
9	Pedro de Araújo LimaMarquess of Olinda	Pedro de Araújo Lima; Marquess of Olinda (1793–1870)	4 May 1857	12 December 1858	1 year, 222 days	Conservative	Pedro II	Olinda II
10	Antonio Paulino Limpo de AbreuViscount of Abaeté	Antonio Paulino Limpo de Abreu; Viscount of Abaeté (1798–1883)	12 December 1858	10 August 1859	241 days	Conservative	Pedro II	Abaeté
11	Ângelo Moniz da Silva Ferraz	Ângelo Moniz da Silva Ferraz (1812–1867)	10 August 1859	2 March 1861	1 year, 204 days	Conservative	Pedro II	Ferraz
12	Luís Alves de Lima e SilvaMarquess of Caxias	Luís Alves de Lima e Silva; Marquess of Caxias (1803–1880)	2 March 1861	24 May 1862	1 year, 83 days	Conservative	Pedro II	Caxias II
13	Zacarias de Góis e Vasconcelos	Zacarias de Góis e Vasconcelos (1815–1877)	24 May 1862	30 May 1862	6 days	Progressive League	Pedro II	Zacarias I
14	Pedro de Araújo LimaMarquess of Olinda	Pedro de Araújo Lima; Marquess of Olinda (1793–1870)	30 May 1862	15 January 1864	1 year, 230 days	Progressive League	Pedro II	Olinda III
15	Zacarias de Góis e Vasconcelos	Zacarias de Góis e Vasconcelos (1815–1877)	15 January 1864	31 August 1864	229 days	Progressive League	Pedro II	Zacarias II
16	Francisco José Furtado	Francisco José Furtado (1818–1870)	31 August 1864	12 May 1865	254 days	Liberal	Pedro II	Furtado
17	Pedro de Araújo LimaMarquess of Olinda	Pedro de Araújo Lima; Marquess of Olinda (1793–1870)	12 May 1865	3 August 1866	1 year, 110 days	Liberal	Pedro II	Olinda IV
18	Zacarias de Góis e Vasconcelos	Zacarias de Góis e Vasconcelos (1815–1877)	3 August 1866	16 July 1868	1 year, 348 days	Liberal	Pedro II	Zacarias III
19	Joaquim Rodrigues TorresViscount of Itaboraí	Joaquim Rodrigues Torres; Viscount of Itaboraí (1802–1872)	16 July 1868	29 September 1870	2 years, 75 days	Conservative	Pedro II	Itaboraí II
20	José Antônio Pimenta BuenoViscount of São Vicente	José Antônio Pimenta Bueno; Viscount of São Vicente (1803–1878)	29 September 1870	7 March 1871	159 days	Conservative	Pedro II	Pimenta Bueno
21	José ParanhosViscount of Rio Branco	José Paranhos; Viscount of Rio Branco (1819–1880)	7 March 1871	25 June 1875	4 years, 110 days	Conservative	Pedro II	Rio Branco
22	Luís Alves de Lima e SilvaDuke of Caxias	Luís Alves de Lima e Silva; Duke of Caxias (1803–1880)	25 June 1875	5 January 1878	2 years, 194 days	Conservative	Pedro II	Caxias III
23	João Lins Cansanção	João Lins Cansanção (1810–1906)	5 January 1878	28 March 1880	2 years, 83 days	Liberal	Pedro II	Sinimbu
24	José Antônio Saraiva	José Antônio Saraiva (1823–1895)	28 March 1880	21 January 1882	1 year, 299 days	Liberal	Pedro II	Saraiva I
25	Martinho Campos	Martinho Campos (1816–1887)	21 January 1882	3 July 1882	163 days	Liberal	Pedro II	Martinho Campos
26	João da Cunha ParanaguáViscount of Paranaguá	João da Cunha Paranaguá; Viscount of Paranaguá (1821–1912)	3 July 1882	24 May 1883	325 days	Liberal	Pedro II	Paranaguá
27	Lafayette Rodrigues Pereira	Lafayette Rodrigues Pereira (1834–1917)	24 May 1883	6 June 1884	1 year, 13 days	Liberal	Pedro II	Lafayette
28	Manuel Pinto de Sousa Dantas	Manuel Pinto de Sousa Dantas (1831–1894)	6 June 1884	6 May 1885	334 days	Liberal	Pedro II	Dantas
29	José Antônio Saraiva	José Antônio Saraiva (1823–1895)	6 May 1885	20 August 1885	106 days	Liberal	Pedro II	Saraiva II
30	João Maurício VanderleiBaron of Cotegipe	João Maurício Vanderlei; Baron of Cotegipe (1815–1889)	20 August 1885	10 March 1888	2 years, 203 days	Conservative	Pedro II	Cotegipe
31	João Alfredo de Oliveira	João Alfredo de Oliveira (1835–1919)	10 March 1888	7 June 1889	1 year, 89 days	Conservative	Pedro II	João Alfredo
32	Afonso CelsoViscount of Ouro Preto	Afonso Celso; Viscount of Ouro Preto (1836–1912)	7 June 1889	15 November 1889	161 days	Liberal	Pedro II	Ouro Preto

=== Prime ministers of the United States of Brazil (1961–1963) ===
The second parliamentary experience lasted from 8 September 1961 to 24 January 1963, when João Goulart was President of Brazil. After a plebiscite held in January 1963, the presidential regime was reestablished, which remains in the country to the present day.

No.	Portrait	Prime Minister	Took office	Left office	Time in office	Party	President
1	Tancredo Neves	Tancredo Neves (1910–1985)	8 September 1961	12 July 1962	307 days	PSD	João Goulart
2	Francisco Brochado da Rocha	Francisco Brochado da Rocha (1910–1962)	12 July 1962	18 September 1962	68 days	PSD	João Goulart
3	Hermes Lima	Hermes Lima (1902–1978)	18 September 1962	23 January 1963	127 days	PTB	João Goulart

== See also ==
- List of presidents of Brazil
