= Alfredo Buzaid =

Brazilian jurist, lawyer, magistrate and professor

Justice of the Supreme Federal Court
- In office 30 March 1982 – 20 July 1984
- Appointed by: João Figueiredo
- Preceded by: Carlos Fulgêncio da Cunha Peixoto
- Succeeded by: Sydney Sanches

Minister of Justice
- In office 30 October 1969 – 15 March 1974
- Appointed by: Emílio Garrastazu Médici
- Preceded by: Luís Antônio da Gama e Silva
- Succeeded by: Armando Falcão

Personal details
- Born: 20 July 1914 Jaboticabal, São Paulo, Brazil
- Died: 10 July 1991 (aged 76) São Paulo, Brazil
- Education: University of São Paulo

Alfredo Buzaid (20 July 1914 – 10 July 1991) was a Brazilian jurist, lawyer, magistrate and professor. During the military dictatorship he was Minister of Justice in the Emílio Garrastazu Médici government and Minister of the Supreme Court appointed by President João Figueiredo.

He was one of the leading drafters of the 1973 Code of Civil Procedure, which became known as the "Buzaid Code" and was in force until 2015.

== Biography ==
Buzaid attended primary and secondary school at the Ginásio São Luiz in Jaboticabal, completed in 1930. He entered the São Paulo Law School in 1931, graduating in 1935.

Besides law, he also worked as journalist writing for his hometown newspaper “O Combate”, and for Gazeta Comercial, becoming editor for the latter.

Alfredo Buzaid participated in the Sociedade de Estudos Políticos (Society of Political Studies), a group of São Paulo Law students centered around Plínio Salgado. From that group emerged the Brazilian Integralist Action (AIB), of which Buzaid was active in the São Paulo Integralist Students Section, He wrote for the group's official newspaper, O Integralista, in November 1932, one month after the ofounding of AIB. He was head of the AIB section in his municipality, Jaboticabal, and remained in his integralist beliefs until the end of his life, according to historian and parliamentarian Carlos Giannazi.

=== Law practice ===
Buzaid in 1971 (Arquivo Nacional).

Buzaid started his lawyer career in Jaboticabal and, in 1938, returned to São Paulo

He was student of Enrico Tullio Liebman in aa specialisation course at the São Paulo Law Schoolem 1935, later joining the "Escola Paulista de Direito Processual" and becoming Liebman's personal friend.

In 1960 he was appointed by the Brazilian Federal Government to draft the Code of Civil Procedure, which was eventually presented by him 4 years later.

In 1966 he assumed the position of director of the University of São Paulo Law School after being named on a triple list for the rector's approval, according to rules established by the current dictatorial regime, succeeding Luís Eulálio de Bueno Vidigal. In 1969, he was named vice rector of the University of São Paulo.

=== Military dictatorship (1964-1985) ===
According to Zuenir Ventura, in his book 1968 - O ano que não terminou, Alfredo Buzaid would have participated in the meeting that took place at the Planalto Palace in late 1968 in which the Institutional Act Number 5 (AI-5) was designed, being one of its main defenders. According to the author, the AI-5 would have been even more rigid if approved in the manner advocated by Buzaid.

In October 1969, Buzaid was appointed Minister of Justice, being one of the intellectual mentors of the Code of Civil Procedure which came into force in 1974. He remained in the Ministry of Justice until 14 March 1974.

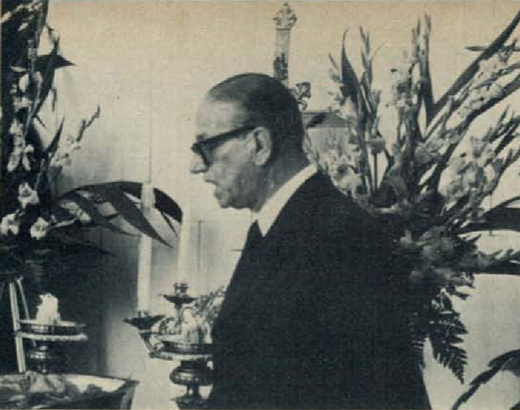
Alfredo Buzaid attending the funeral of Plínio Salgado, in 1975.

On 22 March 1982, Buzaid was appointed Minister of the Supreme Federal Court. His nomination faced strong opposition from the Order of Attorneys of Brazil He took office on 30 March and remained in it for a little over two years, being compulsorily retired on 20 July 1984, when he reached the then limit age of 70. He then returned to his law firm and academic production.

Buzaid died of cancer in his house in São Paulo on 9 July 1991, days before his 77th birthday.

His archive - with more than 25 mil works- is kept at the São Paulo State University library in Franca.
