= José Antônio Pimenta Bueno, Marquis of São Vicente =

Brazilian politician (1803–1878)

Marquis of São Vicente
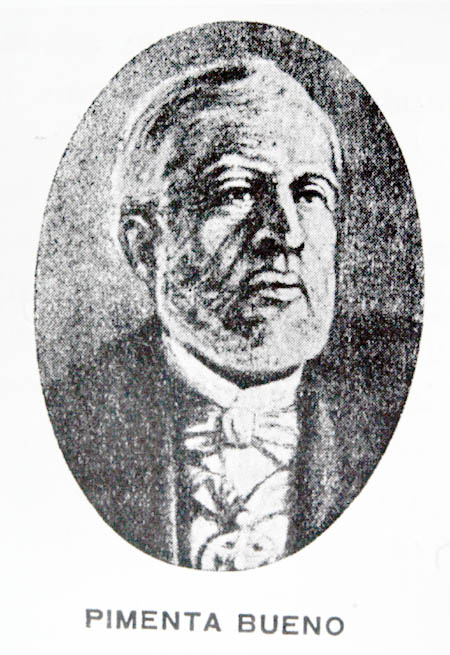

Prime Minister of Brazil
- In office 29 September 1870 – 7 March 1871
- Monarch: Pedro II of Brazil
- Preceded by: Viscount of Itaboraí
- Succeeded by: Viscount of Rio Branco

Foreign Minister
- In office 29 September 1870 – 7 March 1871
- Preceded by: João Silveira de Sousa
- Succeeded by: Manuel Francisco Correia
- In office 29 January 1848 – 8 March 1848
- Preceded by: Saturnino de Sousa e Oliveira Coutinho
- Succeeded by: Antônio Paulino Limpo de Abreu

Minister of Justice
- In office 29 September 1870 – 7 March 1871
- Preceded by: José Paranhos, Viscount of Rio Branco
- Succeeded by: Manuel Francisco Correia

Personal details
- Born: 4 December 1803 Santos, Colonial Brazil
- Died: 19 February 1878 (aged 74)
- Awards: The Imperial Order of the Rose

José Antônio Pimenta Bueno, Marquis of São Vicente, (4 December 1803 – 19 February 1878) was a Brazilian magistrate, diplomat and politician. He served as Prime Minister of Brazil from 1870 to 1871.

== Public life ==
He entered public service in the province of São Paulo at the age of twenty-one. After graduating from the Juridical Academy of São Paulo, he was appointed to the magistracy of the province. He was the judge of the court of appeals of Maranhão in 1844 and of the main court in August 1847, before being appointed to the Supreme Court of Justice.

In 1833 he was elected councilor for the province of São Paulo and, two years later, appointed governor of Mato Grosso. In October 1843 he was appointed chargé d'affaires in Paraguay; he arrived in Asunción on August 18, 1844, and presented his credentials to President Carlos Antonio López on August 19 of the same year. Later he would become an advisor to the Secretariat for Foreign Affairs and a plenipotentiary for the negotiation of agreements with Argentina and the United Kingdom.

On 29 January 1848 he became Minister of Foreign Affairs, also holding the Justice portfolio, which he headed until May 30. On March 8, he left Foreign Affairs.

By 1849, Pimenta Bueno left the Liberal Party and joined the Conservative Party. He was nevertheless a strong supporter of the abolition of slavery, drafting five parliamentary bills on the matter.

In 1850, he was named governor of the Rio Grande do Sul. Three years later, he was appointed senator of the Empire by Emperor Pedro II. He became a Councilor of State in 1859 and was made Viscount of São Vicente in 1867, then Marquis in 1872.

On 29 September 1870 became President of the Council (Prime Minister), a post which he held until 7 March 1871. He also held the Foreign Ministry for a second time.

== Personal life ==
He was abandoned as a baby at the door of the surgeon-major José Antônio Pimenta Bueno and his wife Mariana Benedita de Faria e Albuquerque, who adopted him. His natural parents are unknown.

He was married to Balbina Henriqueta de Faria e Albuquerque.

== Works ==
- Teses para a oposição à Cadeira de Substituto (1843)
- Apontamentos sobre as formalidades do Processo Civil (1850)
- Apontamentos sobre o processo Criminal Brasileiro (1857)
- Direito Público Brasileiro e Análise da Constituição do Império (1857)
- Direito internacional privado e aplicação de seus princípios com referência às Leis Particulares do Brasil (1863)
- Considerações relativas ao beneplácito e recurso à Coroa em matéria de culto (1873)
