= Francisco Jê Acaiaba de Montezuma, Viscount of Jequitinhonha =

Brazilian lawyer and politician (1794–1870)

Viscount of Jequitinhonha
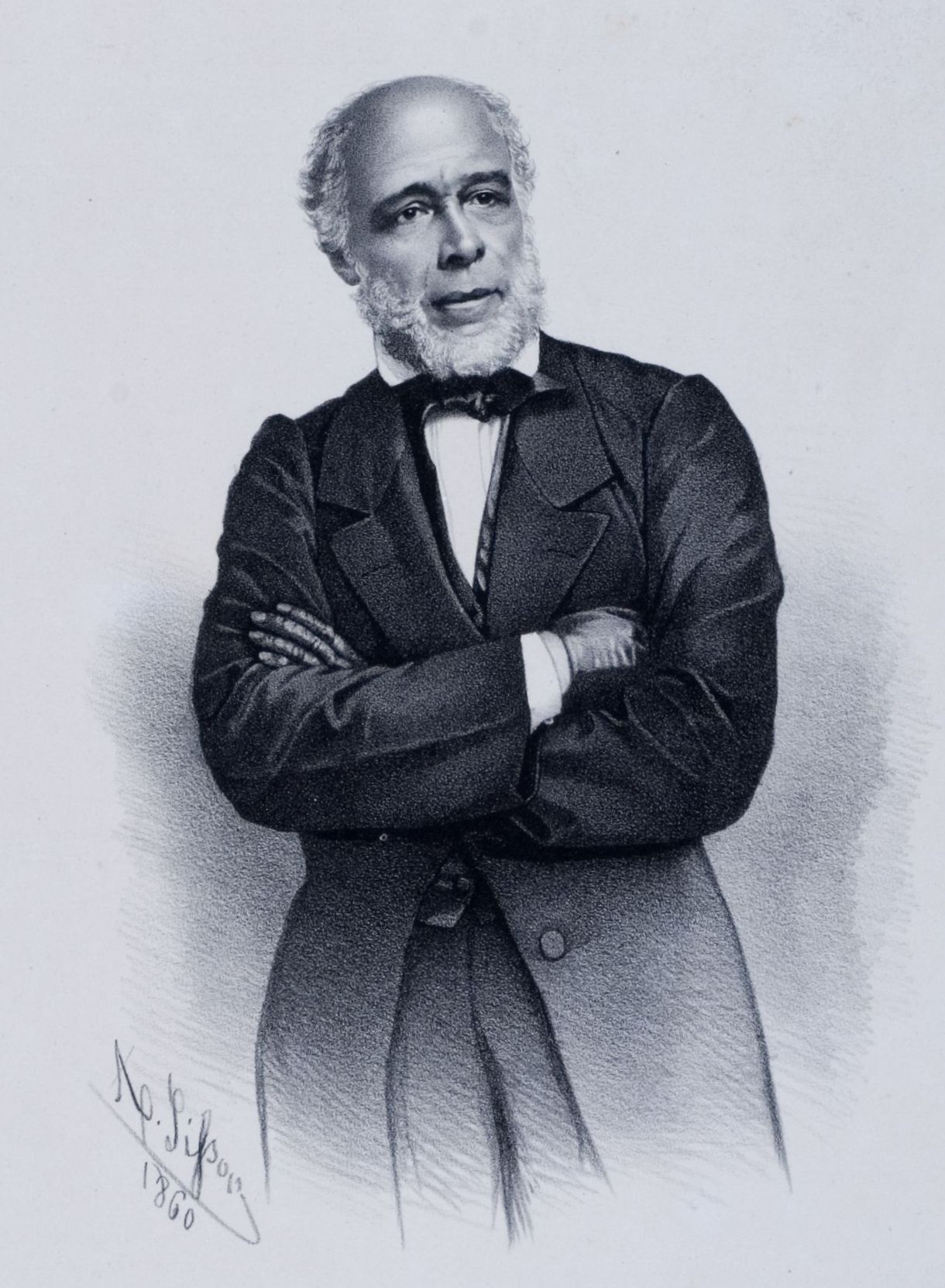

Minister of Justice
- In office 16 May 1837 – 19 September 1837
- Monarch: Pedro II
- Regent: Diogo Antônio Feijó
- Preceded by: Gustavo Pantoja
- Succeeded by: Bernardo P. de Vasconcelos

Minister of Foreign Affairs
- In office 16 May 1837 – 19 September 1837
- Monarch: Pedro II
- Regent: Diogo Antônio Feijó
- Preceded by: Antônio Paulino
- Succeeded by: Antônio Peregrino

Personal details
- Born: Francisco Gomes Brandão; 23 March 1794 Salvador, Captaincy of the Bay of All Saints, Colonial Brazil
- Died: 15 February 1870 (aged 75) Rio de Janeiro, Neutral Municipality Empire of Brazil
- Spouses: Mariana Angélica de Toledo Marcondes (m. 1823; died 1836) Francisca Maria de Jesus (m. 1842)
- Education: University of Coimbra
- Occupation: Politician; journalist; diplomat

Francisco Jê Acaiaba de Montezuma, first and only Viscount of Jequitinhonha, born Francisco Gomes Brandão (23 March 1794 – 15 February 1870), was a Brazilian jurist, diplomat and politician. He was a senator for the province of Bahia from 1851 to 1870, commanded two ministries during the regency of Diogo Antônio Feijó and was president of the Bank of Brazil.

Montezuma graduated in law from the University of Coimbra. He was the founder and first president of the Institute of Brazilian Lawyers. He was also a pioneer in Brazilian Freemasonry, being the greatest Brazilian Masonic authority of his time. As a politician, he was one of the early proponents of abolitionism.

== Biography ==
=== Family and education ===
Born Francisco Gomes Brandão, he was the son of the Portuguese merchant Manuel Gomes Brandão and mestizo Narcisa Teresa de Jesus Barreto. The family had a good income. His father wanted to make him a priest, so he joined the Seraphic Order of Discalced Franciscans in 1808.

In spite of his father's wish, Montezuma left the convent in a few months and entered the Escola Médico-Cirúrgica in Salvador, the first medical school in Bahia. In 1816, he moved to Portugal, studying at the Faculty of Law of the University of Coimbra, where he graduated in 1821. In Coimbra, he created a political society called Keporática, of Masonic nature.

In 1823, Montezuma married Mariana Angélica de Toledo Marcondes, in Rio de Janeiro. Together they had five children. Mariana died in 1836. He remarried, in second nuptials, to Francisca Maria de Jesus, the Viscountess of Jequitinhonha, in 1842, at João Ribeiro's farm, in Rio Comprido, Rio de Janeiro. Francisca was the widow of Rio de Janeiro politician and wholesaler Marcolino Antônio Leite. No children were recorded from this marriage.

=== Name ===
With the Independence of Brazil, Montezuma abandoned his birth name, changing it to Francisco Jê Acaiaba de Montezuma – thus incorporating to the name allusions to indigenous peoples that formed the Brazilian nation, as well as a tribute to Aztec emperor Montezuma (Jê, spelled "Gê" at the time, designates the Brazilian amerindians of the non-Tupi-Guarani linguistic branch; Acaiaba, spelled "Acayaba" at the time, a word of Tupi origin).

=== Career ===
Montezuma returned to Bahia in 1821. He became an ardent supporter of Brazil's independence. Alongside editor Francisco Corte Real, he published in the newspaper Diário Constitucional, which became the spokesman for Brazilian interests against the so-called "Portuguese Party". When the situation in Salvador became unbearable for Brazilians, he took an active part in the struggles for the Independence of Bahia together with the Provisional Government that had then been formed in the village of Cachoeira. At this time, he was appointed councilor and secretary of the government board of Bahia. With the independence of Brazil, he swore allegiance to the Kingdom of Brazil. In 1822, he was part of the commission responsible for meeting with Pedro I, in Rio de Janeiro, to ask him for measures. Upon meeting the emperor, he received the Order of the Southern Cross for his actions in the struggle for independence and the title of Baron of Cachoeira. Montezuma, however, refused the nobility title.

In 1823, Montezuma was elected deputy to the Constituent Assembly, going to the court. There, with his fiery speech and oratory, he exercised fierce opposition to the Minister of War. The Constituent Assembly was dissolved in 1824 by emperor Pedro I, who also ordered the arrest of six of its members – including Montezuma and José Bonifácio. Together with his wife, he went into exile. For the next eight years, he lived in France, England, Belgium, and the Netherlands.

During his exile, Montezuma was appointed a member of the Paris Geography Society and the Paris Lawyers Institute, among others. He studied and attended a botany course, being a student of René Desfontaines. In London, he visited jury and civil courts. In England he examined factories, manufactures and mines. He did not publish any work during his exile, except for a journalistic article. In 1831, he returned to Brazil after the abdication of Pedro I.

Montezuma was sworn in as general deputy in 1831. That year, he asked the Chamber of Deputies to take legislative measures against the importation of slaves. Thus, he became one of the first deputies in Brazilian history to fight against the slave trade, being one of the pioneers of the abolitionist movement. He ended up not being re-elected deputy, having received only 36 votes in the entire province of Bahia.

In 1837, Montezuma was appointed general deputy for Bahia. In the same year, the regent Diogo Antônio Feijó appointed him Minister of Justice and Minister of Foreign Affairs, occupying both ministries for a few months. In 1838, he was among the founding members of the Brazilian Historic and Geographic Institute. He was one of the supporters of the Declaration of Age of emperor Pedro II and, in 1840, he was re-elected deputy. He was plenipotentiary minister to the British government, in London, between 1840 and 1841. Back in Brazil, he was a member of the Provincial Assembly of Rio de Janeiro for two legislatures, also acting as its president.

In 1850, Montezuma was appointed a member of the Council of State. In 1851, emperor Pedro II appointed him for the Senate, representing Bahia. In the Empire of Brazil senators were chosen from a triple list submitted to the emperor and had a lifetime tenure. Before being chosen, Montezuma had appeared twice on the triple lists: once for Bahia and once for Rio de Janeiro. In 1866, he held the presidency of the Bank of Brazil for a few months. As a senator, he was a notorious proponent of the abolition of slavery. In 1865, he was the first to advocate in Parliament for the abolition of slavery for the next 15 years. He presented several projects that dealt with the gradual extinction of slavery. One of his proposals gave rise to the Rio Branco Law.

Montezuma was the founder and first president of the Institute of Brazilian Lawyers. He held the presidency of the institution from 1843 until 1850, when he resigned as he considered this function incompatible with the post of State Councilor. He remained as honorary president of the institute. He fought, without success, for the creation of the Order of Attorneys of Brazil.

=== Freemasonry ===
Montezuma had a prominent place in the history of Freemasonry in Brazil. On 12 March 1829, then in exile, he received a letter of authorization from the Supreme Council of Belgium to install a Supreme Council of the Scottish Rite in Brazil. Back in Brazil, Montezuma installed the Supreme Council. As the Grand Sovereign Commander of the Supreme Council of the 33rd Degreeof the Scottish Rite, it was the greatest Masonic authority in Brazil at the time.
