= Bernardo Pereira de Vasconcelos =

Brazilian politician, journalist, judge and law expert

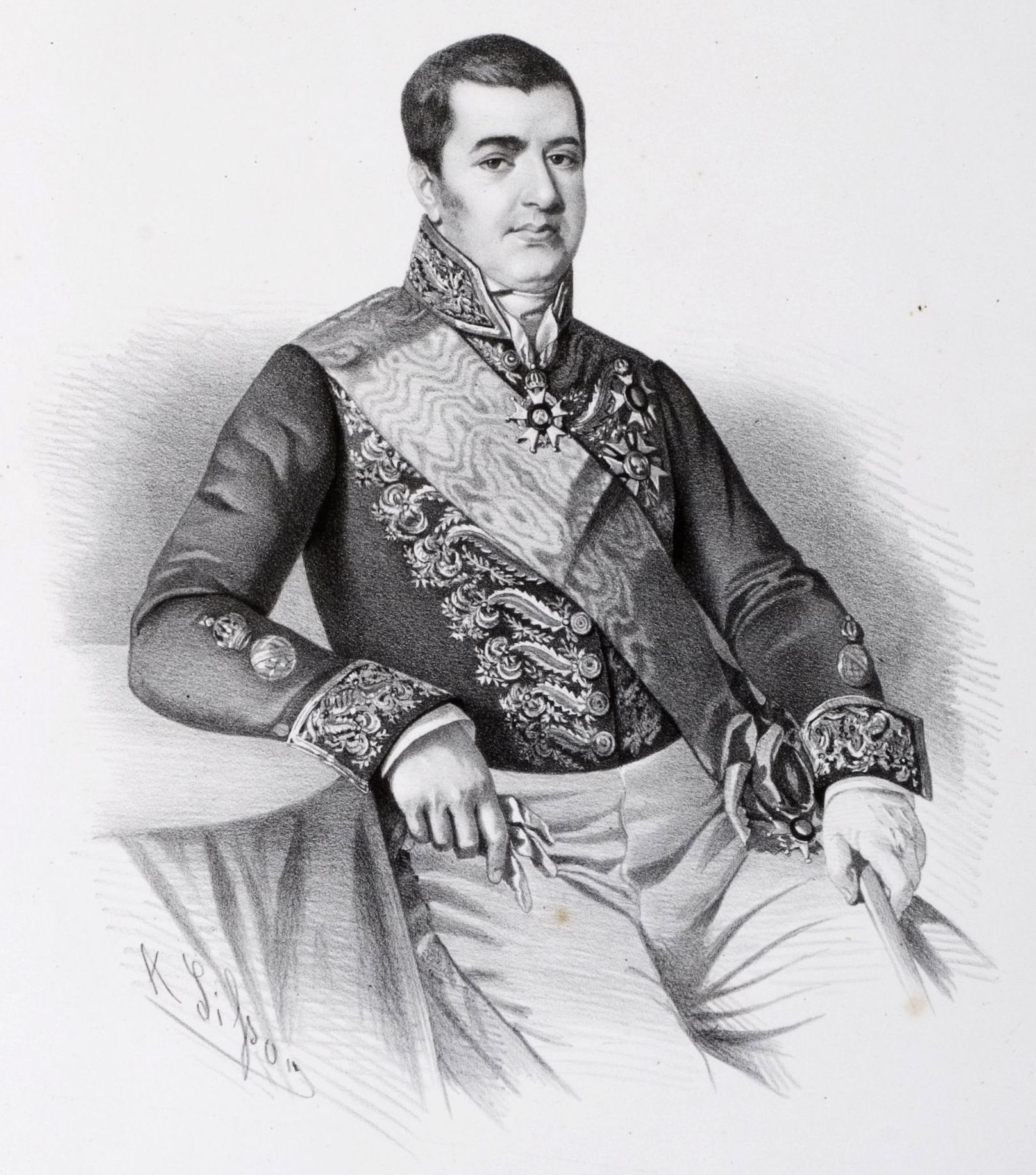

Minister of Justice
- In office 19 September 1837 – 16 April 1839
- Preceded by: Francisco de Montezuma
- Succeeded by: Francisco de Paula

Personal details
- Born: 27 August 1795 Vila Rica, Minas Gerais, Brazil (Portuguese colony)
- Died: 1 May 1850 (aged 54) Rio de Janeiro, Empire of Brazil
- Party: Liberal Party
- Occupation: Politician

Bernardo Pereira de Vasconcelos (27 August 1795 - 1 May 1850) was a Brazilian politician, journalist, judge and law expert of the Imperial era.

He is considered one of the most important political personalities of the imperial period, below only José Bonifácio de Andrada and Martim Francisco Ribeiro de Andrada, being one of the builders and idealizers of the Empire.

== Early life ==
The son of Diogo Pereira Ribeiro de Vasconcelos and Maria do Carmo Barradas, Bernardo Pereira de Vasconcelos was born in Vila Rica, Minas Gerais (currently Ouro Preto) on 27 August 1795. Bernardo's father, a Portuguese born in the freguesia of Santo Ildefonso, Porto, studied in the Mariana Seminary and later moved to Coimbra, where he graduated with a Law degree in 1782, returning to Minas Gerais the following year.

== Political career ==
Vasconcelos begun his public service in 1825, as a member of the Government Council of the Province of Minas Gerais. Diamonds and the Doce river were two subjects of interest at the time, and he bravely fought the concession to the Diamond Company, prompting the council to represent the Emperor on his inconvenience, and the decree of May 6, 1825 approving the grant of the Doce River Agriculture, Commerce, Mining and Navigation Society, freely given to the British (defended by the Marquis of Baependi) when the river had long been navigable and the major obstacle to trade came not from waterfalls but from Botocudo Indians.

In 1825 also began his collaboration as main editor of the newspaper O Universal, published in Vila Rica (Ouro Preto). Thus, for 25 years, a man of precarious health, he kept uninterrupted work in drafting laws and codes, from the discussions in the provincial House of Representatives, until his unforeseen end. As soon as the Lower House was closed down, returned to Minas and took part in the works of the Government Council of the Province and later in the Provincial Assembly. In order to be able to go to court in March 1826, he sold a farmhouse.

He was a deputy in the first Legislative Chamber of the Empire. The first legislature of the Chamber of Deputies, which was installed in a solemn session on May 6, 1826, in the presence of the emperor, who recommends the adoption of complementary laws, decides on the diffusion of the smallpox vaccine, the regulation of relations between the Church and State; the process of expropriation to the fixation of the Armed Forces; the endowment of the imperial family, the reform of the Judiciary; public education, the creation of legal courses in São Paulo and Olinda; separation of powers and definition of competences; the responsibility of ministers of state for political crimes; the municipal administration and the Criminal Code of 1830, originating in the projects of Vasconcelos and José Clemente Pereira.

On August 7, 1826, he authored the project that created the Supreme Court of Justice, converted into law only in 1828 that abolished the Discharge of the Palace, in a major decentralization reform. He had an important part in the discussion about the foundation of legal courses, which he wanted in Rio de Janeiro, fighting against Bairista influences. In fact, there was the first commission of five important congressmen in the Brazilian parliamentary tradition, and Vasconcelos was part of it as rapporteur, along with Januário da Cunha Barbosa, Almeida and Albuquerque, Nicolau Pereira de Campos Vergueiro, and Lúcio de Gouveia. From the outset he imposed himself on his teammates and has since been in the foreground. Ungrateful efforts, for the Constitution of March 25, 1824, with its Moderating Power, a symbol of all political organization and privately delegated to the Emperor, "and the Executive Power also headed by the Emperor, inviolable, sacred and irresponsible" in the words of the historian Octávio Tarquínio de Sousa, did not fit easily into cabinet mechanisms. It is true that the Constitution was made to careers, but also the parliamentary regime was born suddenly ...

The constitutional Monarchy, then the preferred form of government of the Brazilian bourgeoisie, constituted the ideal of Bernardo Pereira de Vasconcelos. He was always guided by an English liberalism with a sincere liberal, without ever being an ideologue (attached to only theoretical constructions). The monarchist principle seemed to him the agglutinative element par excellence of a country shaken by internal struggles and threatened with secession. There are those who claim to be the key to all their attitudes in the phrase - "Why should we question what is best to do, if the tightness of our current circumstances only allows us to ask what can be done?"

José Pedro Xavier da Veiga, in Ephemerides Mineiras, says: "Practical and positive spirit until insensitivity, he recommended to social problems solutions according to the tangible interest of the State, although high principles of a moral order perished." Therefore, the coming of slaves Negroes to Brazil seemed to him an imperious necessity of civilization and the development of the country.

In 1826, D. João VI died, and the emperor was summoned to Portugal, absorbed by the complications of the Portuguese politics. And the unpopular war in the South, the origin of so many brutal recruitments, and resulting in the loss of the Cisplatina Province, gave rise to violence. The House was going to be closed and could not remedy it. Bernardo Pereira de Vasconcelos, however, worked hard and already in January 1827 announced in O Universal "at 1$600 per copy, the draft Code of the Empire", a criminal code that would perpetuate his name.

He died in May, 1850, of yellow fever.
