= Paulino Soares de Sousa, 1st Viscount of Uruguai =

Brazilian politician

His Excellency The Viscount of Uruguai
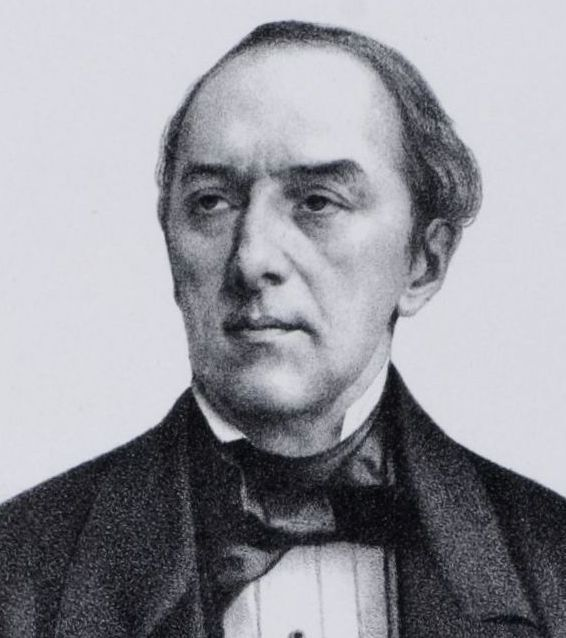

Minister of Foreign Affairs
- In office 8 October 1849 – 6 September 1853
- Prime Minister: Marquis of Monte Alegre; Viscount of Itaboraí
- Preceded by: Marquis of Olinda
- Succeeded by: Viscount of Abaeté
- In office 8 June 1843 – 2 February 1844
- Monarch: Pedro II
- Preceded by: Marquess of Paraná
- Succeeded by: Ernesto Ferreira França

Minister of Justice
- In office 23 May 1840 – 24 July 1840
- Regent: Marquis of Olinda
- Preceded by: José da Silva Maia
- Succeeded by: Viscount of Abaeté
Further offices held
Senator for Rio de Janeiro
In office 1850–1866 Life tenure
General Deputy
In office 1837–1848
Constituency	Rio de Janeiro

Personal details
- Born: 4 October 1807 Paris, French Empire
- Died: 15 July 1866 (aged 58) Rio de Janeiro, Empire of Brazil
- Party: Conservative
- Education: Law School, University of São Paulo
- Occupation: Politician

Paulino José Soares de Sousa, the Viscount of Uruguai (4 October 1808 – 15 July 1866), was a congressman, a senator, a State Councillor and a skilful diplomat.

Born in Paris, he distinguished himself during the 1850s when, as Minister of Foreign Affairs for Brazil, he organized the Brazilian Diplomatic Corps and structured the entire Brazilian policy of intervention in the River Plate against Juan Manuel de Rosas from Argentina, and Manuel Oribe from Uruguay.

A cautious diplomat, he knew how to take advantage of favourable circumstances, excluding unilateral action by Brazil and acting only at the request of the constitutional governments in the region. Success also came from his part in Franco-English involvement. He took on the financial burden incurred by France in maintaining the government of Montevideo and in relation to England, took steps towards the abolition of the slave traffic, creating favourable conditions for involvement by Brazil and its allies. In Paris in 1855 he negotiated the issue of Brazilian borders with French Guiana, which resulted in the matter being finally resolved in 1900, by the Baron of Rio Branco.

The Viscount died in Rio de Janeiro, aged 58.
