= José de Jesus Filho =

Brazilian politician and jurist (1927–2021)

Minister of Justice (acting)
- In office 1 April 1998 – 7 April 1998
- President: Fernando Henrique Cardoso
- Preceded by: Iris Rezende
- Succeeded by: Renan Calheiros

Member of the Superior Court of Justice
- In office 9 January 1986 – 30 June 1997
- Preceded by: position established
- Succeeded by: Aldir Passarinho Junior

Personal details
- Born: 8 December 1927; Araguari, Brazil
- Died: 31 December 2021 (aged 94); Brasília, Brazil

José de Jesus Filho (8 December 1927 – 31 December 2021) was a Brazilian jurist and politician. He served on the Superior Court of Justice from 1986 to 1997 and served as acting Minister of Justice for six days in April 1998. He died on 31 December 2021, at the age of 94.
