= José Carlos Pereira de Almeida Torres, Viscount of Macaé =

Brazilian politician

Viscount of Macaé
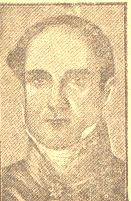

Prime Minister of Brazil
- In office 8 March 1848 – 31 May 1848
- Monarch: Pedro II
- Preceded by: Viscount of Caravelas
- Succeeded by: Francisco Sousa e Melo
Further offices held
Minister of Commerce
In office 8 March 1848 – 31 May 1848
Preceded by	Viscount of Caravelas
Succeeded by	José Pedro Dias de Carvalho
In office 2 February 1844 – 29 September 1845
Preceded by	José Antônio da Silva Maia
Succeeded by	Viscount of Caravelas
Minister of Justice
In office 26 May 1845 – 29 September 1845
Preceded by	Manuel Antônio Galvão
Succeeded by	Antônio Limpo de Abreu
Governor of São Paulo
In office 17 August 1842 – 27 January 1843
Preceded by	Baron of Monte Alegre
Succeeded by	Joaquim José Luís de Sousa
In office 13 January 1829 – 15 April 1830
Preceded by	Manuel Joaquim de Ornelas
Succeeded by	Manuel Joaquim Gonçalves de Andrade
Governor of Rio Grande do Sul
In office 8 January 1831 – 29 March 1831
Preceded by	Américo Cabral de Melo
Succeeded by	Américo Cabral de Melo

Personal details
- Born: c. 1799 Salvador, Bahia, Colonial Brazil
- Died: 25 April 1850 (aged 50–51) Rio de Janeiro, Empire of Brazil
- Party: Liberal

José Carlos Pereira de Almeida Torres, 2nd Viscount of Macaé, (c. 1799 — 25 April 1850) was a Brazilian magistrate and politician, who served as Prime Minister of Brazil in 1848.

== Biography ==
He was the son of judge José Carlos Pereira, and of Ana Zeferina de Almeida Torres. He married his cousin Eudóxia Engrácia de Almeida Torres, leaving offspring.

After graduating in law, he served as a magistrate in Paraná, Minas Gerais and Bahia, having attained the degree of Judge in Bahia. He was a deputy general for Minas Gerais (8 May 1826 - 3 September 1829) for Bahia (3 May 1830 - 6 October 1833) and for São Paulo (1 January 1843 - 13 June 1843); governor of Rio Grande do Sul (January 8 - March 29, 1831) and São Paulo (January 13 - March 9, 1829, October 10, 1829 - April 15, 1830 and August 17, 1842 - January 27, 1843), Minister of Justice, Minister of the Empire, President of the Council of Ministers (Prime Minister) and senator of the Empire of Brazil from 20 June 1843 to 25 April 1850.

His noble title derived from the municipality of Macaé where he was a wealthy farmer who owned the Fazenda Saudade, where he produced coffee and sugar.

He died in 1850, victim of the fever epidemic that periodically ravaged the country. He was buried in the Church of Nossa Senhora da Conceição, in Niterói.

== Titles and honours ==
He became Viscount in 1829, obtaining the Grandeur de Macaé in 1847. He was also a Gentleman of the Imperial Chamber of His Majesty's Council, and commander of the Imperial Order of Christ, among others.
