= José Clemente Pereira =

Brazilian politician (1787–1854)

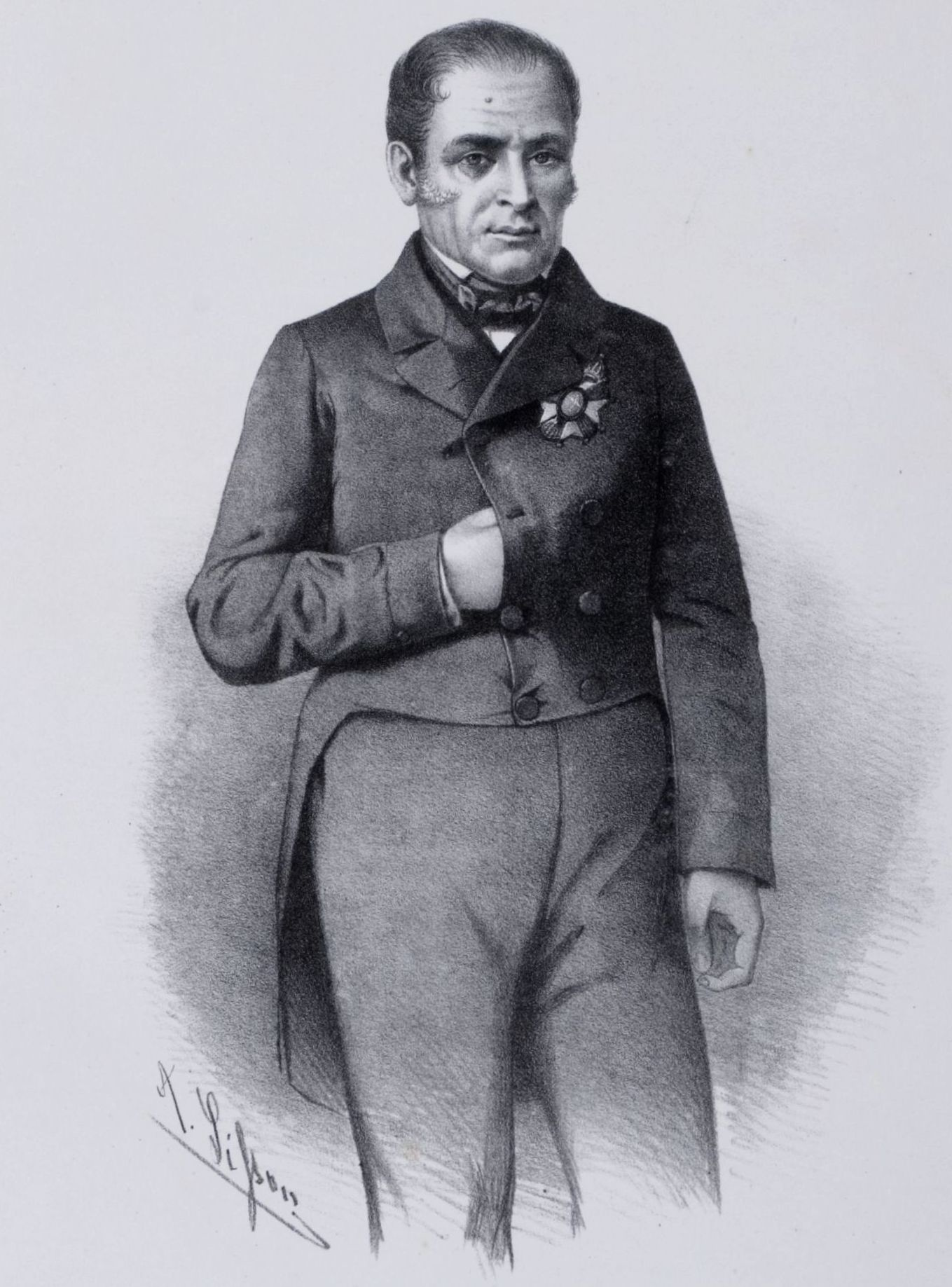

Minister of Justice
- In office 18 June 1828 – 25 September 1828
- Preceded by: Lúcio Soares de Gouveia
- Succeeded by: José Bernardino de Almeida

Personal details
- Born: 12 February 1787 Ade, Castelo Mendo, Portugal, Kingdom of Portugal
- Died: 10 March 1854 (aged 67) Rio de Janeiro, Empire of Brazil
- Occupation: Politician; magistrate

José Clemente Pereira, known as José Pequeno (José the Short) (12 February 1787 – 10 March 1854), was a Portuguese-born Brazilian magistrate and politician who fought in the Peninsular War and of high relevance to the Empire of Brazil, in addition to having been an active member in the Masonic Order.

== Biography ==
=== Early life ===
The son of José Gonçalves and Maria Pereira, Clemente was born on 12 February 1787 in Ade, [Castelo Mendo, Portugal].

His parents trusted his literary education on his uncle, a priest who qualified him to enroll at the University of Coimbra, where Clemente obtained a degree in Law and Canon law.

After graduation, he enlisted in the so-called "Academic Battalion" to fight the French in Portugal, where he rose through the ranks to serve in the Anglo-Portuguese Army that faced the French in Spain, under the leadership of the Duke of Wellington.

=== French invasion of Portugal ===
At the time of the French invasions of Portugal, Clemente enlisted in the Academic Battalion that was organized in the country and which was commanded by José Bonifácio de Andrada e Silva. In the army, he was elevated to the rank of captain and commander of one of the guerrillas that did the most damage to the invading French forces. From Portugal, he began to attack the French in Spain, forming part of the Anglo-Portuguese Army that helped in the fall of the First French Empire, forcing the French to evacuate the Iberian Peninsula.

Clemente remained in the Portuguese army for a long time, from where he saw the abdication of Napoleon as a result of the Treaty of Fontainebleau. The resulting peace meant that his work as a soldier was no longer necessary, he then left Europe in 1815 and went to Brazil to start a new career.

=== In Brazil ===
Unknown in Brazil, he was forced to work as a lawyer for a living, and so he remained until 1819, when he was nomitated juiz de fora and tasked with founding the village of Praia Grande (present-day Niterói).

On 26 February 1821 he received news that the people were gathering to swear in the Portuguese constitution. The Municipal Chamber of Maricá, where Clemente was, swore the constitution and ordered public celebrations.

He held the offices of General Deputy, Minister of Foreign Affairs, Minister of Justice, Minister of War, Councilor of State, Minister of Finance and Senator of the Empire of Brazil from 1842 to 1854. He was provider of the Santa Casa de Misericórdia and his widow was awarded the title of Countess of Piedade.

Clemente was senator for the province of Pará, State councilor, belonged to the Emperor's Council. He was also a member of the Brazilian Historic and Geographic Institute, the Auxiliary Society of National Industry, the Society Amateur of Instruction and of the Dramatic Conservatory.

He was President of the House Senate. He came to Brazil, where he began his political career, being Minister of Justice and, twice, Minister of War. In 1828, the Emperor offered him the Ministry of the Empire, and, for just two days, he held the Treasury, where he created the Commercial Code of the Empire of Brazil.

=== Role in the independence of Brazil ===
José Clemente Pereira led the popular demonstrations of the so-called Dia do Fico, when then prince regent Pedro was convinced to disobey orders from the Portuguese cortes to leave Brazil.

On 30 May 1821 Clemente served as juiz de fora in the court. At this time he was elected president of the Municipal Chamber of Rio de Janeiro, from which he received, signed by his colleagues, a document in which they expressed admiration and recognition for his opposition to the Portuguese officers on June 5, who, armed in the Largo do Rocio, wanted to swear the Portuguese Constitution and force prince Pedro to obey orders from general Jorge de Avilez.

He was elected to the Chamber Senate and allied with Joaquim Gonçalves Ledo in the campaigns for independence, being threatened and persecuted. He actively advised prince regent Pedro and thus prevented him from swearing in the Constitution drawn up by the Cortes of Portugal.

The freemasons, led by Joaquim Gonçalves Ledo and José Clemente Pereira, moved to dissuade prince Pedro from complying with the orders of the Portuguese cortes, which requested his return to Europe in 1821. Although initially inclined to respect the directives of the cortes, the prince regent was convinced by Gonçalves Ledo and José Clemente, who managed to get representatives from Rio de Janeiro, Minas Gerais, São Paulo and Bahia to adhere to the request that he not leave Brazil, leading to the Dia do Fico on 9 January 1822. On May 13, the Freemasonry granted prince Pedro the title of "Perpetual Protector and Defender of the United Kingdom of Brazil", which the prince partially declined, accepting only that of "Perpetual Defender".

Clemente led the great popular demonstration of the Dia do Fico, which called for the prince regent to remain in Brazil. The text of the declaration calling for Pedro's permanence in Brazil, the so-called Petição do Fico, was written by friar Francisco de Sampaio and delivered by José Clemente Pereira to the prince regent of Brazil, Pedro.

The Independence of Brazil was promulgated on 12 October 1822 (the declaration of independence took place on 7 September 1822). After being proclaimed emperor, Pedro I decided to remove those who asked for a more democratic monarchy. Among them was José Clemente Pereira, who was accused of being an anarchist and demagogue. After a quick trial, Clemente was exiled, the same fate as Gonçalves Ledo. In 1824, after two years of exile, he returned to Rio de Janeiro.

== Political offices ==
José Clemente was elected Intendant General and later Deputy to the General Assembly for Minas Gerais, São Paulo and four times for Rio de Janeiro. He was a Senator for Alagoas (once), Rio de Janeiro (twice) and Pará (once). He was named commander of the army. He held several important public positions during the Reign of the same Emperor who had exiled him: Minister of the Empire, at the same time of Finance, Justice, Foreigners and War.

As Minister of the Empire, he endorsed some of the first laws of political organization in Brazil, such as the law creating the Supreme Court of Justice.

He served as General Deputy from 1826 to 1829; 1830 to 1833; 1838 to 1841 and Senator from 1842 to 1854.

He was also Minister of War and Navy during the reign of emperor Pedro II and Councilor of State.

José Clemente renovated the Post Office and opened the first annual painting exhibition, hosted at the National Academy of Fine Arts. When he was Minister of War, he carried out several movements that consolidated the land forces. In his term as Minister of Justice, he sanctioned the Criminal Code of 1830 and the Commercial Code of 1850. In addition, he founded the National Hospice for the Insane, which was completed in 1852.

In Rio de Janeiro, he took measures mainly focused on infrastructure, such as the plumbing of the waters of Lagoinha and Paineiras, the construction of fountains in Laranjeiras, Cosme Velho and São Cristovão, in addition to several improvements in the neighborhoods of Catete and Maracanã.
