= Ângelo Moniz da Silva Ferraz, Baron of Uruguaiana =

Brazilian politician

Baron of Uruguaiana
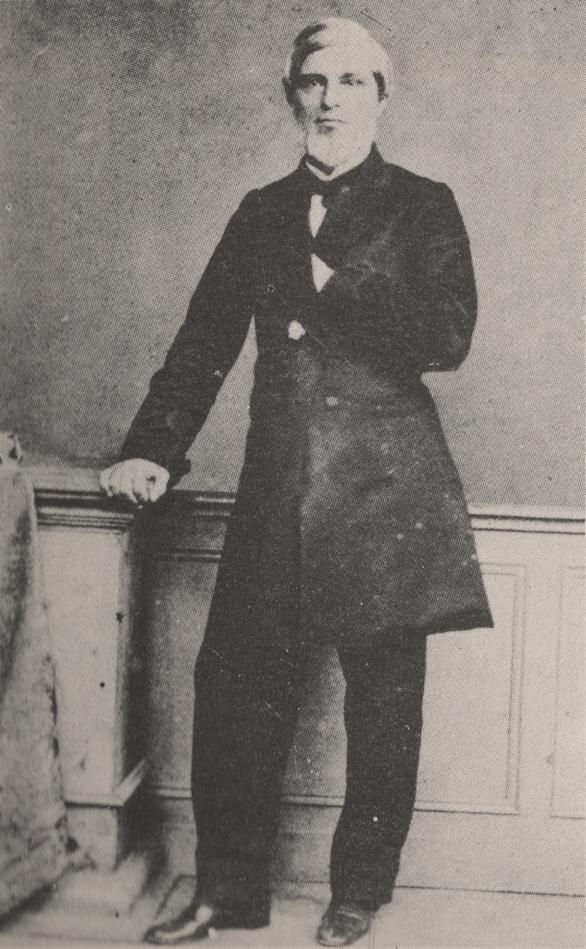
- Silva Ferraz, c. 1860

Prime Minister of Brazil
- In office 10 August 1859 – 2 March 1861
- Monarch: Pedro II
- Preceded by: Viscount of Abaeté
- Succeeded by: Marquess of Caxias
Further offices held
Minister of War
In office 10 November 1865 – 7 October 1866
| Preceded by | José Antônio Saraiva |
| Succeeded by | Marquess of Paranaguá |
In office 12 May 1865 – 8 July 1865
| Preceded by | José Egídio Gordilho de Barbuda Filho |
| Succeeded by | José Antônio Saraiva |
Finance Minister
In office 10 August 1859 – 2 March 1861
| Preceded by | Francisco Torres Homem |
| Succeeded by | José Maria da Silva Paranhos |
Minister of Commerce
In office 1 December 1859 – 2 February 1860
| Preceded by | João de Almeida Pereira Filho |
| Succeeded by | João de Almeida Pereira Filho |

Personal details
- Born: 3 December 1812 Valença, Bahia, Colonial Brazil
- Died: 18 January 1867 (aged 54) Petrópolis, Empire of Brazil
- Awards: Grand Cross of the Military Order of Christ, Commander of the Imperial Order of Christ , Dignitary of the Imperial Order of the Rose

Ângelo Moniz da Silva Ferraz, Baron of Uruguaiana (3 November 1812 – 18 January 1867) was a Brazilian magistrate and politician. He served as Prime Minister of Brazil from 10 August 1859 to 2 March 1861.

== Biography ==
He graduated from the Faculty of Law at Olinda in 1834, and was soon thereafter appointed prosecutor in Salvador, later becoming a judge in Jacobina.

He was elected several times, as provincial deputy in Bahia in 1838, then general deputy between 1843 and 1856 and senator between 1856 and 1866. He was made court customs inspector in 1848 and judge of the Treasury in 1853.

He was governor of Rio Grande do Sul from October 16, 1857 to April 22, 1859, President of the Council of Ministers (Prime Minister), from August 10, 1859 to March 2, 1861, Finance Minister from August 10, 1859 to March 2, 1861, and Minister of War from 1865 to 1866.

While Minister of War, he was adjutant to Emperor Pedro II during the surrender of Paraguayan Colonel Estigarribia, in the city of Uruguaiana, on September 18, 1865 during the Paraguayan War. In commemoration of this episode, he was awarded the title of Baron of Uruguaiana in 1866.

As Finance Minister (a position he took on together with the Presidency of the Council of Ministers), he pursued a policy of developing internal and customs revenues. His management of the national finances was characterized by the creation of the Department of Agriculture, Commerce and Public Works; the organization of savings banks; regulation of issuing banks and money supply; introduction of accountability of those responsible to the National Treasury; and compulsory civil service examinations.
