= Zuenir Ventura =

Brazilian journalist and writer (1931–2026)

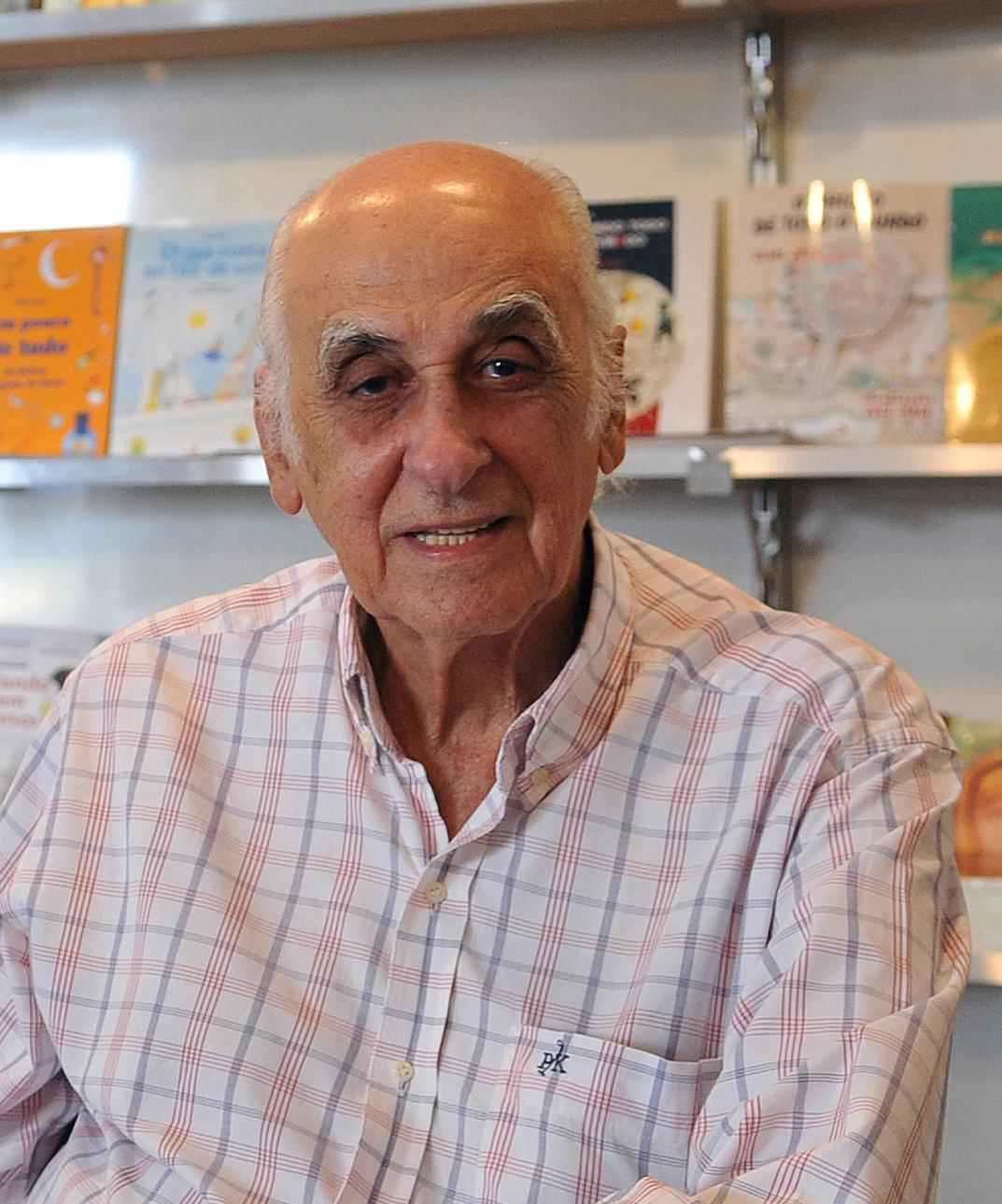
- Ventura in 2012

7th Academic of the 32nd chair of the Brazilian Academy of Letters
- In office March 6, 2015 – September 22, 2026
- Preceded by: Ariano Suassuna

Personal details
- Born: Zuenir Carlos Ventura; June 1, 1931 Além Paraíba, Minas Gerais, Brazil
- Died: September 22, 2026 (aged 95) Rio de Janeiro, Brazil

Zuenir Carlos Ventura (June 1, 1931 – September 22, 2026) was a Brazilian journalist and writer. He was a columnist for the newspaper O Globo, and for Época magazine. He won the Jabuti Prize in 1995 in the "reportage" category for the book Cidade Partida. In 2009, his book 1968 - O que Fizemos de Nós won the third place at the same category of the prize. In 1989, he and his team of journalists from Jornal do Brasil won the Esso Journalism Award for their reportage on Chico Mendes' murder investigation.

== Life and career ==
Zuenir Carlos Ventura was born in Minas Gerais and moved to Rio de Janeiro during his youth. He had to work in order to pay his superior studies. His first job was as a wall painter apprentice, with his father. He was also a janitor at a bar and a denture laboratory; an office-boy at a bank agency, a clerk in a shirt store, and an elementary school teacher. From this last experience he created his will to study languages. He graduated as a teacher and taught for more than forty years at the Communication School of the Federal University of Rio de Janeiro and at the Superior School of Design of the Rio de Janeiro State University.

His first job related to journalism was as an archivist at Tribuna da Imprensa, when he was still at university. However, he would only become a journalist when Carlos Lacerda (then manager-owner of the newspaper) asked his employees if anyone would be able to write something about Albert Camus, who had recently died at the time. Zuenir offered himself and started his journalistic career.

Ventura died in Rio de Janeiro on September 22, 2026, aged 95.

== Publications ==
- 1968: O Ano que Não Terminou (1968: The Year That Didn't End) — Editora Nova Fronteira (1989, 2006)/Editora Planeta (2008)
- Cidade Partida (Broken City) — Companhia das Letras (1994)
- Inveja: Mal Secreto (Envy: Secret Evil) — Editora Objetiva (1998)
- Chico Mendes: Crime e Castigo: Quinze anos depois, o autor volta ao Acre para concluir a mais premiada reportagem sobre o herói dos povos da floresta (Chico Mendes: Crime and Punishment: Fifteen years later, the author returns to Acre to conclude the most awarded reportage about the hero of the people of the forest) — Companhia das Letras (2003)
- 1968: O que Fizemos de Nós (1968: What We Did of Us) — Editora Planeta do Brasil (2009)
