= Francisco de Paula Sousa e Melo =

Brazilian politician

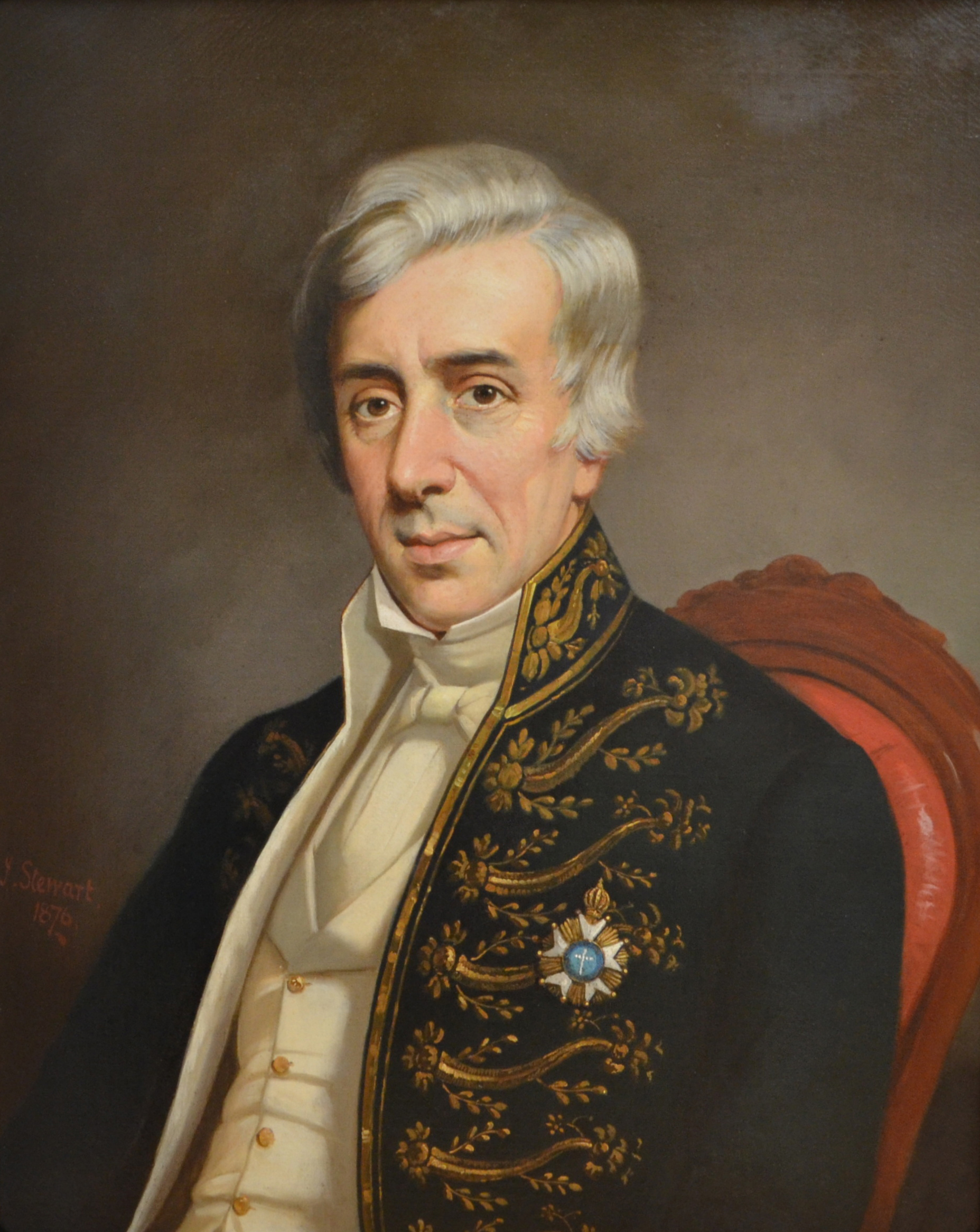

Prime Minister of Brazil
- In office 31 May 1848 – 29 September 1848
- Monarch: Pedro II
- Preceded by: Viscount of Macaé
- Succeeded by: Viscount of Olinda

Secretary of State of the Empire Affairs
- In office 22 July 1847 – 28 August 1848
- Preceded by: Manuel Alves Branco
- Succeeded by: Manuel Alves Branco

Finance Minister
- In office 31 May 1848 – 18 August 1848
- Preceded by: José Pedro Dias de Carvalho
- Succeeded by: Bernardo de Sousa Franco

Personal details
- Born: 5 January 1791 Itu, São Paulo, Colonial Brazil
- Died: 16 August 1851 (aged 60) Rio de Janeiro, Empire of Brazil
- Party: Liberal
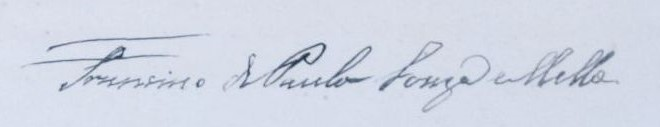
- Signature

Francisco de Paula Sousa e Melo (5 January 1791 - 16 August 1851) was a Brazilian landowner, nobleman and politician who served as Prime Minister of Brazil.

== Biography ==
Son of Antônio José de Sousa and Gertrudes Solidônia de Cerqueira. Uncle of Senator Francisco Antônio de Sousa Queirós. In 1819 he married Maria de Barros Leite, his cousin, daughter of captain Antônio de Barros Penteado and Maria de Paula Machado. They had eight children, including Francisco de Paula Sousa.

A friend of priest Diogo Antônio Feijó, he lived for a while at his home in Rio de Janeiro, at Rua São José, no. 28.

He was elected by São Paulo as a deputy in the Portuguese Constituent Cortes of 1820 but was unable to travel across the Atlantic because of poor health. He was later a member of the 1823 Brazilian Constituent Assembly from May 3 to November 12, 1823. He was a deputy general in the first three legislatures (8 May 1826 to 3 September 1829 and from 3 May 1830 to 5 October 1833), and President of the Chamber of Deputies (from 4 May to 2 June 1827). He was a senator for the Province of São Paulo (from August 1833 to 1854) and Prime Minister of the Empire of Brazil in 1848.

He died on August 16, 1851. He was buried in the Cemetery of Catumbi in Rio de Janeiro.
