= Progressive League (Brazil) =

Political party (1864–68)

Progressive League Liga Progressista
- Leader: Nabuco de Araújo
- Founded: June 6, 1864
- Dissolved: July 16, 1868
- Preceded by: Liberal Party
- Headquarters: Rio de Janeiro
- Ideology: Progressivism; Radicalism; Classical liberalism
- Political position: Centre-left
- Colors: Green

The Progressive League was a political party of the Empire of Brazil. It arose from liberals discontented with the rule of the Conservative Party, and was supported by some dissident conservatives, such as Nabuco de Araújo.

The league's program was officially launched on 6 June 1864 by Silveira Mota in the Senate, the league being dissolved on 16 July 1868 by Emperor Pedro II, holder of the Moderating Power. Among its members, the figure of Counselor Zacarias de Góis e Vasconcelos stood out.

For José Murilo de Carvalho, the Progressive Party, as an organized and conciliatory political group, dominated the political scene between 1862 and 1868. The league appeared in 1862 and the consequent Progressive Party, two years later, in 1864, remaining active until 1868, when then, with the fall of its greater representative, Zacarias de Góis and Vasconcelos, ended up dissolving. Part of its members formed the Liberal Party and another party would join the newly founded (in 1873) Republican Party.

In the Second Reign (1840–1889), others were the leading parties in public life and political decisions of that time: the Liberal Party (1831), the Conservative Party (1837), the Progressive Party (1862), the Liberal-Radical Party (1868), the Liberal Party (1869), the Republican Party (1873), etc. and movements such as the Popular Meeting in Recife to deliberate on the oath of the Draft Constitution and the Manifesto of the Center-Liberal.

== Bibliography ==
- BLAKE, Sacramento. Diccionario bibliographico brazileiro. Rio de Janeiro : Typ. Nacional, 1883–1902. v. 1, p. 71-72.
- LANGRAF PICCOLO, Helga Iracema. A política rio-grandense no Segundo Império (1868–1882). Gabinete de Pesquisa de História do Rio Grande do Sul, 1974, 155 páginas
- LOMBARDI FERNANDES, Maria Fernanda. A esperança e o desencanto: Silva Jardim e a república. Humanitas, 2008 – 268 páginas (ISBN 978-85-7732-079-0)
- SCHULZ, John. O Exército na política: origens da intervenção militar, 1850-1894- São Paulo: EdUSP, 01/01/199 – 224 páginas (ISBN 8531401887, 9788531401886)
- CORDEIRO, Celeste. Antigos e modernos: no Ceará provincial. Annablume Editora, 01/01/1997 – 299 páginas – (ISBN 85-85596-95-3)
- COSTA, Milton Carlos. Joaquim Nabuco entre a política e a história – Annablume Editora, 2003 – 235 páginas – (ISBN 8574193887, 9788574193885)
