= João Maurício Vanderlei, Baron of Cotegipe =

Brazilian magistrate and politician (1815-1889)

Baron of Cotegipe
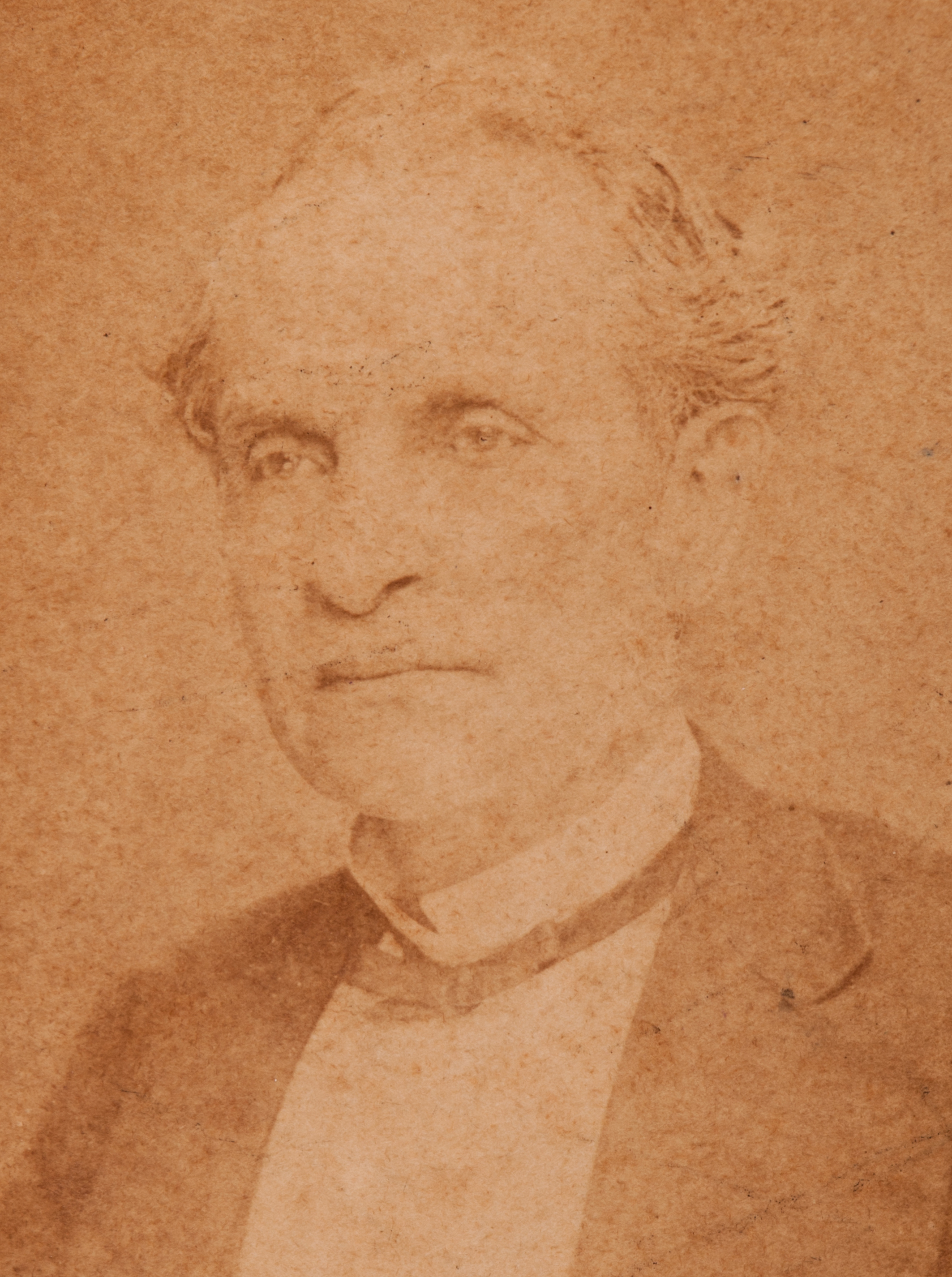

Prime Minister of Brazil
- In office 20 August 1885 – 10 March 1888
- Monarch: Pedro II
- Preceded by: José Antônio Saraiva
- Succeeded by: João Alfredo de Oliveira

Minister of Justice
- In office 27 January 1887 – 8 February 1887
- Preceded by: Joaquim Ribeiro da Luz
- Succeeded by: Samuel Wallace MacDowell III

Personal details
- Born: 23 October 1815 Barra, Pernambuco, Kingdom of Brazil
- Died: 13 February 1889 (aged 73) Rio de Janeiro, Empire of Brazil
- Party: Conservative
- Occupation: Politician

João Maurício Vanderlei or Wanderley, Baron of Cotegipe (23 October 1815 – 13 February 1889), was a Brazilian magistrate and politician of the Conservative Party.

Born as the son of João Maurício Vanderlei, a Dutch descendant, and Francisca Antónia do Livramento, of Portuguese ancestry.

He graduated from the University of Olinda in 1837 with a bachelor's degree in Law and was Marine Minister, Farm Minister, External Minister and Justice Minister of Brazil. He was also President of the Senate of Brazil from 1881 to 1885, and President of the Council of Ministers from 1885 until 1888 and president of the Banco do Brasil.

He was responsible for the approvement of the Sexagenarians Law in 1885, which granted freedom to slaves who were older than 60 years old.

He was dismissed from his post by Princess Isabel during her third regency in 1888. Months later, as a senator, he was the only one to vote against the approval of the Golden Law, which abolished slavery. He is assigned the dialogue with the Princess where he says: "Your Highness released a race but lost the throne" to which the Princess promptly replied: "A thousand thrones I had, a thousand thrones I would give to liberate the slaves of Brazil"

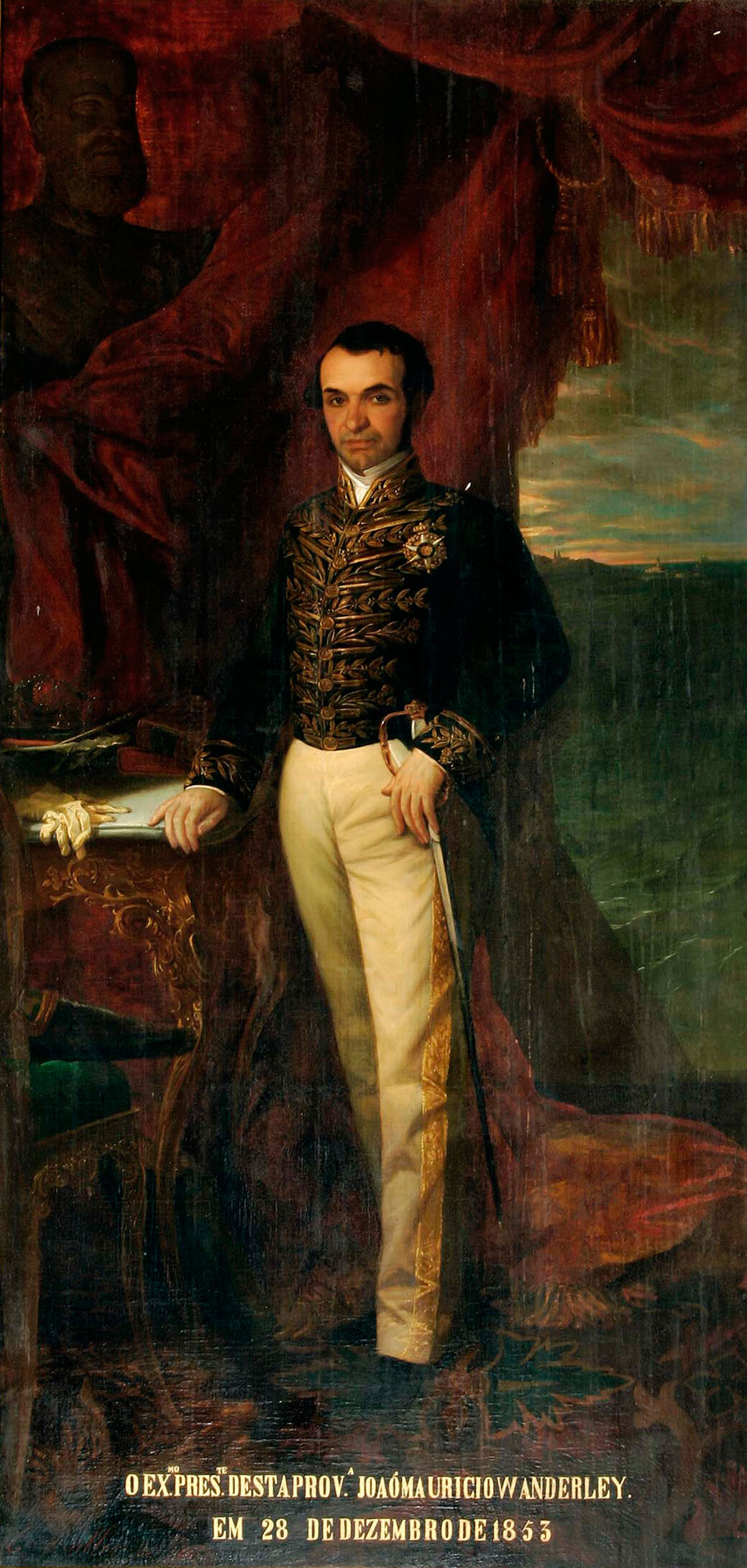
Portrait of Vanderlei while President of the Province of Bahia, by Augusto Müller, 1853
