= Armando Falcão =

Brazilian politician

Armando Ribeiro Falcão

Armando Ribeiro Falcão (November 11, 1919 – February 10, 2010) was a Brazilian politician. Falcão was born in Fortaleza. He graduated from Federal University Of Rio de Janeiro Faculty Of Law. From 1974 to 1979, he served as Brazil's Justice Minister under former President Ernesto Geisel.

Falcão died from pneumonia in Rio de Janeiro on February 10, 2010, at the age of 90.
