= José Antônio Saraiva =

Brazilian politician and diplomat (1823–1895)

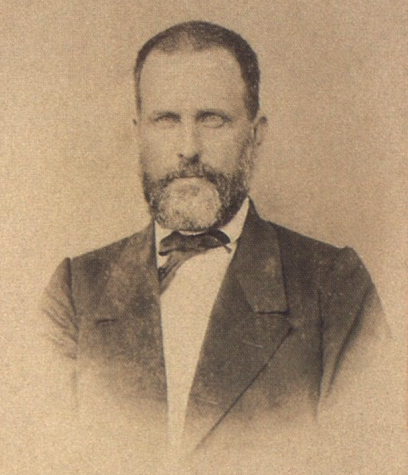

Prime Minister of Brazil
- In office 28 March 1880 – 21 January 1882
- Monarch: Pedro II
- Preceded by: Viscount of Sinimbu
- Succeeded by: Martinho Campos
- In office 6 May 1885 – 20 August 1885
- Monarch: Pedro II
- Preceded by: Manuel de Sousa Dantas
- Succeeded by: Baron of Cotegipe

Personal details
- Born: 1 May 1823; Santo Amaro, Empire of Brazil
- Died: 21 July 1895 (aged 72); Salvador, Bahia, Brazil
- Political party: Liberal Party
- Occupation: Politician

José Antônio Saraiva (1 May 1823 – 21 July 1895), also known as Counsellor Saraiva, was a Brazilian politician, diplomat and lawyer during the period of the Empire of Brazil (1822–1889). He held the position of President of the Council of Ministers (post of prime minister) firstly from 28 March 1880 to 21 January 1882 and second 6 May May 1885 to 20 August 1885. He was appointed by Emperor Pedro II to form a cabinet in the early hours of 16 November 1889, but did not assume the position because of the Republican coup d'état. He was provincial deputy, provincial president, minister of foreign affairs, minister of war, minister of the navy, minister of the empire, minister of finance, senator of the Empire of Brazil from 1869 to 1889 and the republic from 1890 to 1893.
