= Martinho Álvares da Silva Campos =

Brazilian politician

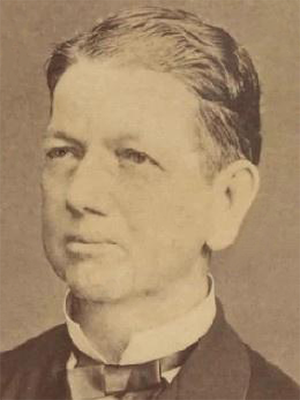

Prime Minister of Brazil
- In office 21 January 1882 – 3 July 1882
- Monarch: Pedro II
- Preceded by: José Antônio Saraiva
- Succeeded by: Marquis of Paranaguá

Personal details
- Born: 22 November 1816 Pitangui, Kingdom of Brazil
- Died: 29 March 1887 (aged 70) Caxambu, Empire of Brazil

Martinho Álvares da Silva Campos (22 November 1816 - 29 March 1887) was a Brazilian medical doctor, senator and adviser of the Empire of Brazil. Son of Martinho Álvares da Silva and Isabel Jacinta de Oliveira Campos

He graduated in medicine on December 20, 1838, from the School of Medicine of Rio de Janeiro. He married three times, his last wife being Felisberta Balbina Ribeiro de Avelar, with whom he had his only child, Martinho Alvares da Silva Campos Filho.

He served in the Chamber of Deputies as deputy, from 1857 to 1881, for Vassouras, Rio de Janeiro and Minas Gerais and was president of the Chamber from January 18, 1882 to February 17, 1882.

He was governor of the province of Rio de Janeiro from March 15, 1881 to March 16, 1882. Between January 21 and July 3, 1882 he held the position of President of the Council of Ministers, being at the same time Minister of Finance. From 1882 to 1887 he was in the Senate and 1886 he was made a Councilor of State.

The municipality of Martinho Campos is named after him.
