= Joaquim Rodrigues Torres, Viscount of Itaboraí =

Brazilian noble and politician (1802–1872)

His Excellency Viscount of Itaboraí
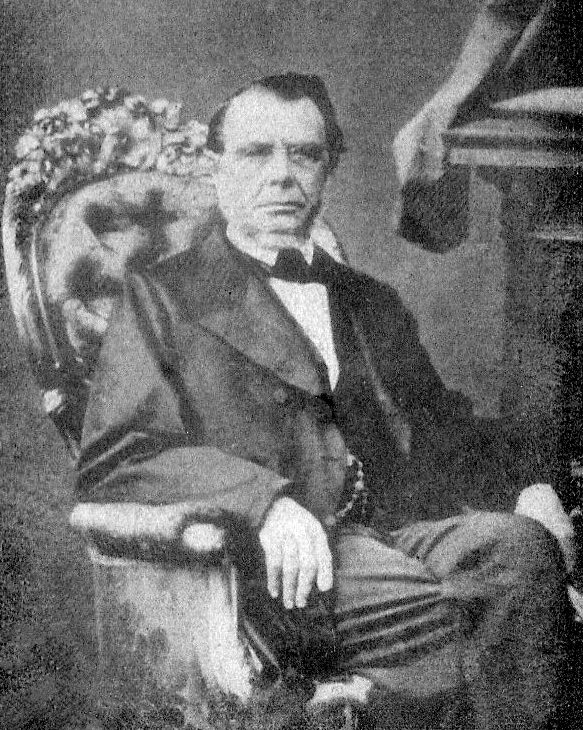

Prime Minister of Brazil
- In office 11 May 1852 – 6 September 1853
- Monarch: Pedro II
- Preceded by: Marquis of Monte Alegre
- Succeeded by: Marquis of Paraná
- In office 16 July 1868 – 29 September 1870
- Monarch: Pedro II
- Preceded by: Zacarias de Góis
- Succeeded by: Viscount of São Vicente

Personal details
- Born: December 13, 1802 Itaboraí, Rio de Janeiro Province, Colonial Brazil
- Died: 8 January 1872 (aged 69) Neutral Municipality, Empire of Brazil
- Party: Conservative Party
- Education: University of Coimbra
- Occupation: Politician, journalist, teacher

Joaquim José Rodrigues Torres, the Viscount of Itaboraí (13 December 1802 – 8 January 1872) was a Brazilian politician and monarchist during the period of the Empire of Brazil (1822–1889). He was the country's Prime Minister from 1868 to 1870.

== Biography ==
Born in 1802 to Manuel José Rodrigues Torres and Emerenciana Matilde Torres, he received his basic education in Rio de Janeiro and later travelled to Portugal, where he graduated in mathematics at the University of Coimbra in 1825. Upon returning to Brazil the following year, he was hired as a surrogate teacher at the Royal Military Academy. He returned to Europe in 1827, improved his education in Paris until 1829, and then returned to Brazil, where he worked as a teacher until 1833.

As a member of the Liberal Party, Torres founded the Independente, a short-lived newspaper. On 16 July 1831, he became a minister of the Brazilian Navy.

Torres was a general deputy at the 3rd legislature for Rio de Janeiro and the first president of the Rio de Janeiro Province, a post under which, among other things, he established the province's capital at Vila Real da Praia Grande (renamed Niterói the following year) and created the Police Guard (present-day Military Police of Rio de Janeiro). In 1837, he shifted to the Conservative Party.

Throughout his life, he held several other posts, including Minister of Economy, State advisor, senator from 1844 to 1872, and two-time president of the Bank of Brazil.

He was appointed a Viscount on 11 December 1854. He opposed the Rio Branco Law before its promulgation.
