= Antônio Paulino Limpo de Abreu, Viscount of Abaeté =

Portuguese-born Brazilian magistrate, diplomat and politician

Viscount of Abaeté
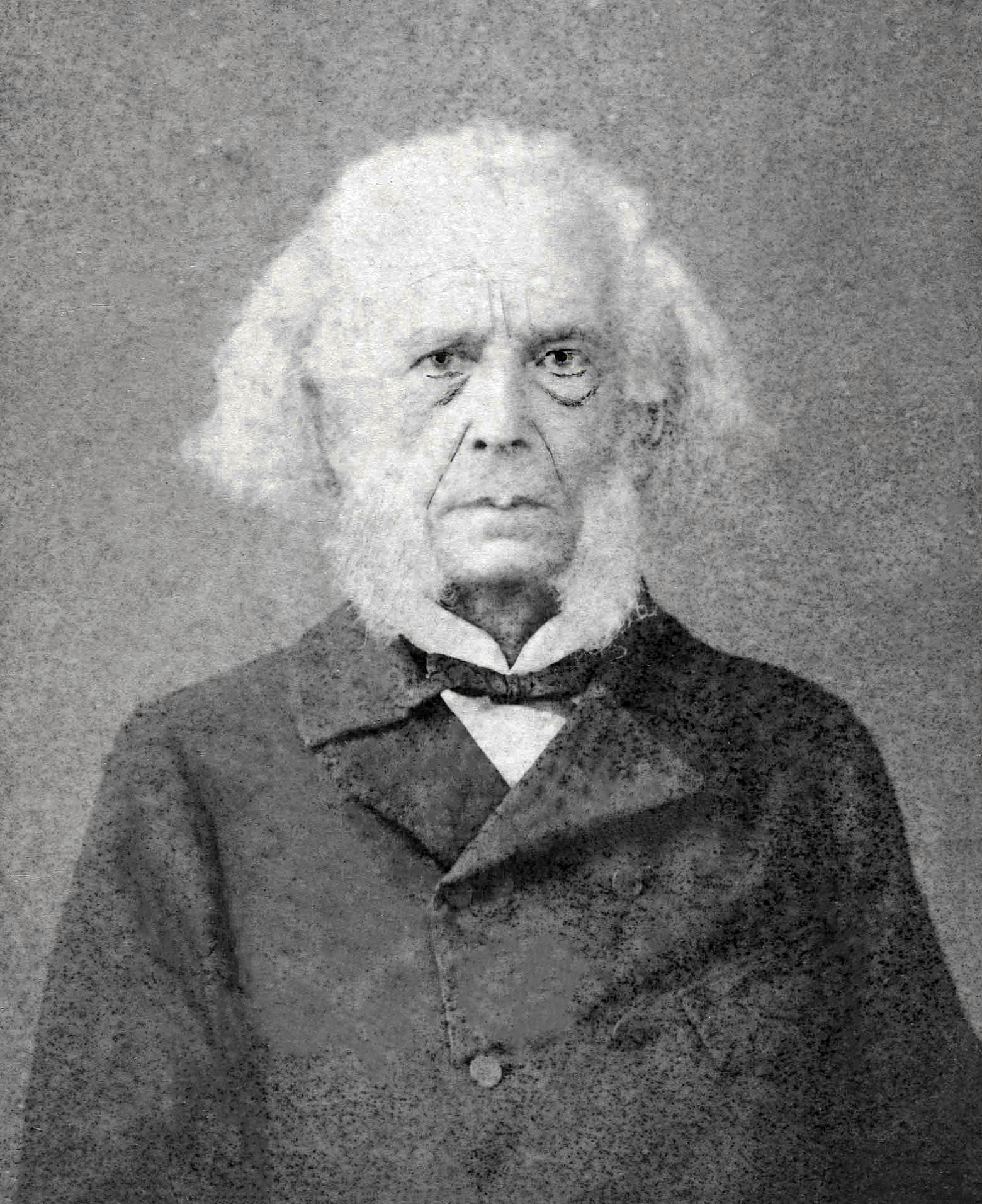
- Abaeté, c. 1870s, by Modesto Ribeiro

Prime Minister of Brazil
- In office 12 December 1858 – 10 August 1859
- Monarch: Pedro II
- Preceded by: Marquis of Olinda
- Succeeded by: Ângelo Moniz da Silva Ferraz

Minister of Justice
- In office 14 October 1835 – 3 June 1836
- Preceded by: Manuel Alves Branco
- Succeeded by: Gustavo de Aguilar Pantoja
- In office 24 July 1840 – 23 March 1841
- Preceded by: Paulino Soares de Sousa
- Succeeded by: Paulino Soares de Sousa
- In office 29 September 1845 – 2 May 1846
- Preceded by: José de Almeida Torres
- Succeeded by: Joaquim Marcelino de Brito

Personal details
- Born: 22 September 1798 Lisbon, Kingdom of Portugal
- Died: 14 September 1883 (aged 84) Rio de Janeiro, Empire of Brazil
- Awards: Order of the Southern Cross; Military Order of Christ; Ordem de Nossa Senhora da Conceição de Vila Viçosa
- Coat of Arms of the Viscount of Abaeté

Antônio Paulino Limpo de Abreu, Viscount of Abaeté (22 September 1798 – 14 September 1883) was a Portuguese-born Brazilian magistrate, diplomat and politician. He served as Prime Minister of Brazil from 1858 to 1859.

He graduated in law at the University of Coimbra in 1820, he was an external judge in São João del-Rei, district ombudsman, judge, councilor, deputy general, governor of Minas Gerais (1833), minister and President of the Council of Ministers (Prime Minister). He was a senator of the Empire of Brazil from 1847 to 1883, and President of the Senate from 1861 to 1873.

As a diplomat, he carried out several missions in Montevideo and in the Argentine Confederation.

He was President of the Council of Ministers and simultaneously Minister of the Navy.
