= Conservative Party (Brazil) =

Conservative Party Partido Conservador
- Leader: João Maurício Vanderlei (last)
- Founders: Honório Hermeto Carneiro Leão; Bernardo Pereira de Vasconcelos; Joaquim José Rodrigues Torres
- Founded: 1836; 190 years ago
- Registered: 1837
- Dissolved: 15 November 1889; 136 years ago
- Preceded by: Restorationist Party
- Succeeded by: Minas Republican Party
- Headquarters: Rio de Janeiro (NM)
- Newspaper: A Constituição (1874–1886); A Provincia de Minas (1880–1887); Correio Paulistano (1877–1889)
- Ideology: Brazilian conservatism; Centralism Classical liberalism Monarchism; Parliamentarism; Fiscal conservatism
- Political position: Right-wing
- Religion: Roman Catholicism
- Colors: Green
- Members nickname: Saquaremas

The Conservative Party (Portuguese: Partido Conservador) was a Brazilian political party of the imperial period, which was formed c. 1836 and ended with the proclamation of the Republic in 1889. This party arose mostly from a dissident wing of the Moderate Party (Partido Moderado) and from some of the members of the Restorationist Party (Partido Restaurador) in the 1830s when it became known as the Reactionary Party (Partido Regressista). In the early 1840s it called itself the Party of Order (Partido de Ordem) to distinguish itself from the liberal opposition, which they accused of disorder and anarchy, and both the party members and its leadership were known as "saquaremas" after the village of Saquarema, where the leadership had plantations and support. In the mid-1850s, it was finally known as the Conservative Party.

== Bibliography ==
- Ilmar Rohloff de Mattos, O tempo saquarema: A formação do estado imperial (Rio de Janeiro: ACCESS, 1994); emphasizes party's role in promoting antidemocratic hierarchies of wealth and authority
- Needell, Jeffrey D. (2006). The party of order : the conservatives, the state, and slavery in the Brazilian monarchy, 1831-1871. Stanford, Calif.: Stanford University Press. ISBN 0-8047-5369-5. Emphasizes party's defense of stability and parliamentary rule.
