= Liberal Party (Brazil, 1831) =

Liberal Party Partido Liberal
- Founded: 1831
- Dissolved: 15 November 1889
- Headquarters: Rio de Janeiro (NM)
- Ideology: Classical liberalism Federalism; Parliamentarism; Monarchism
- Religion: Roman Catholicism
- Members nickname: Luzias

The Liberal Party (Portuguese: Partido Liberal) was a Brazilian political party of the imperial period, which was formed c. 1831 and ended with the proclamation of the Republic in 1889.
