= Regency period (Empire of Brazil) =

1831–1840 regency for Pedro II

- 1831–1840
First Reign	Second Reign
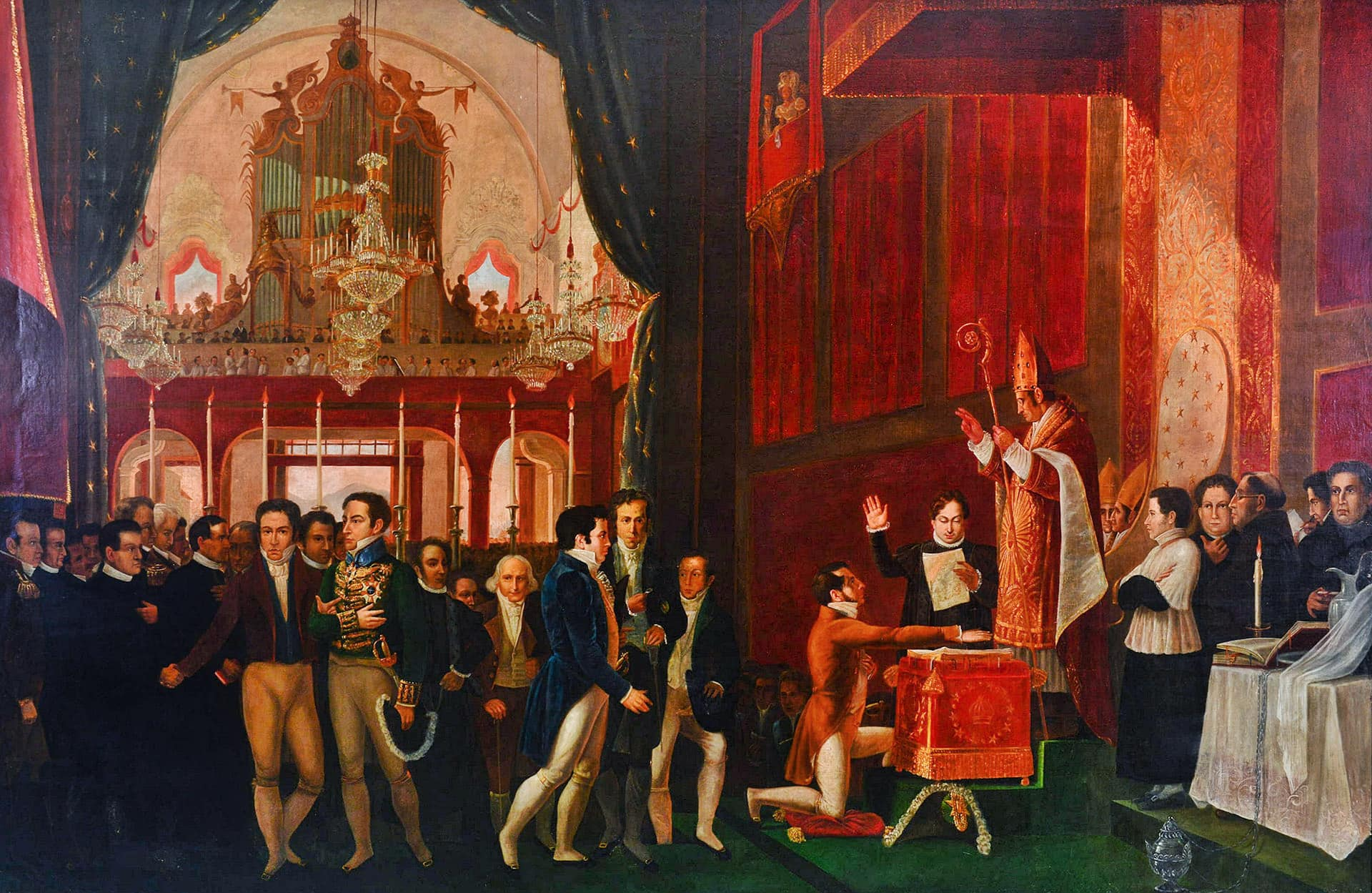
- The oath of the provisional triumviral regents in the Imperial Chapel, painting by Manuel de Araújo Porto-Alegre
- Key events: Abdication of Pedro I Declaration of age of Pedro II

The regency period is how the decade from 1831 to 1840 became known in the history of the Empire of Brazil, between the abdication of Emperor Pedro I, on 7 April 1831, and the declaration of majority of Pedro II, who was legally declared of age by the Senate at the age of 14 on 23 July 1840.

Born on 2 December 1825, Pedro II was, at the time of his father's abdication, 5 years and 4 months old, and therefore could not assume the government which, by law, would be headed by a regency made up of three representatives. During this decade there were four consecutive regencies: the Provisional Triumviral, the Permanent Triumviral, the una (sole) of Diogo Antônio Feijó and the una of Pedro de Araújo Lima.

It was one of the most defining and eventful periods in Brazilian history. In this period Brazil's territorial unity was defied and preserved, as numerous provincial rebellions erupted all over the country, such as the Cabanagem, in Grão-Pará, the Balaiada in Maranhão, the Sabinada, in Bahia, and the Ragamuffin War, in Rio Grande do Sul, the latter being the largest and longest. It was also the period in which the National Guard was created and the degree of autonomy of the provinces and the centralization of power were discussed.

The revolts threatened to disintegrate the country and showed the growing discontent with the central power in Rio de Janeiro and the latent social tensions of the newly independent nation, which prompted the joint effort of their opponents and the central government to maintain order. Historians have remarked that the regency period was the first "republican" experience in Brazil, given its elective nature.

== Background ==
=== The fall of the first emperor ===
According to historian Emília Viotti da Costa, the structure which came to be as a result of Brazil's independence led to the organization of a political system that placed the municipalities dependant on the provinces and these on the central power; Costa also remarked that:

"A system of indirect elections based on qualified (census) suffrage, which excluded most of the population from the electoral process, was adopted. They eagerly disputed titles of nobility and monopolized positions in the Chamber of Deputies, the Senate, the Council of State and the Ministries".

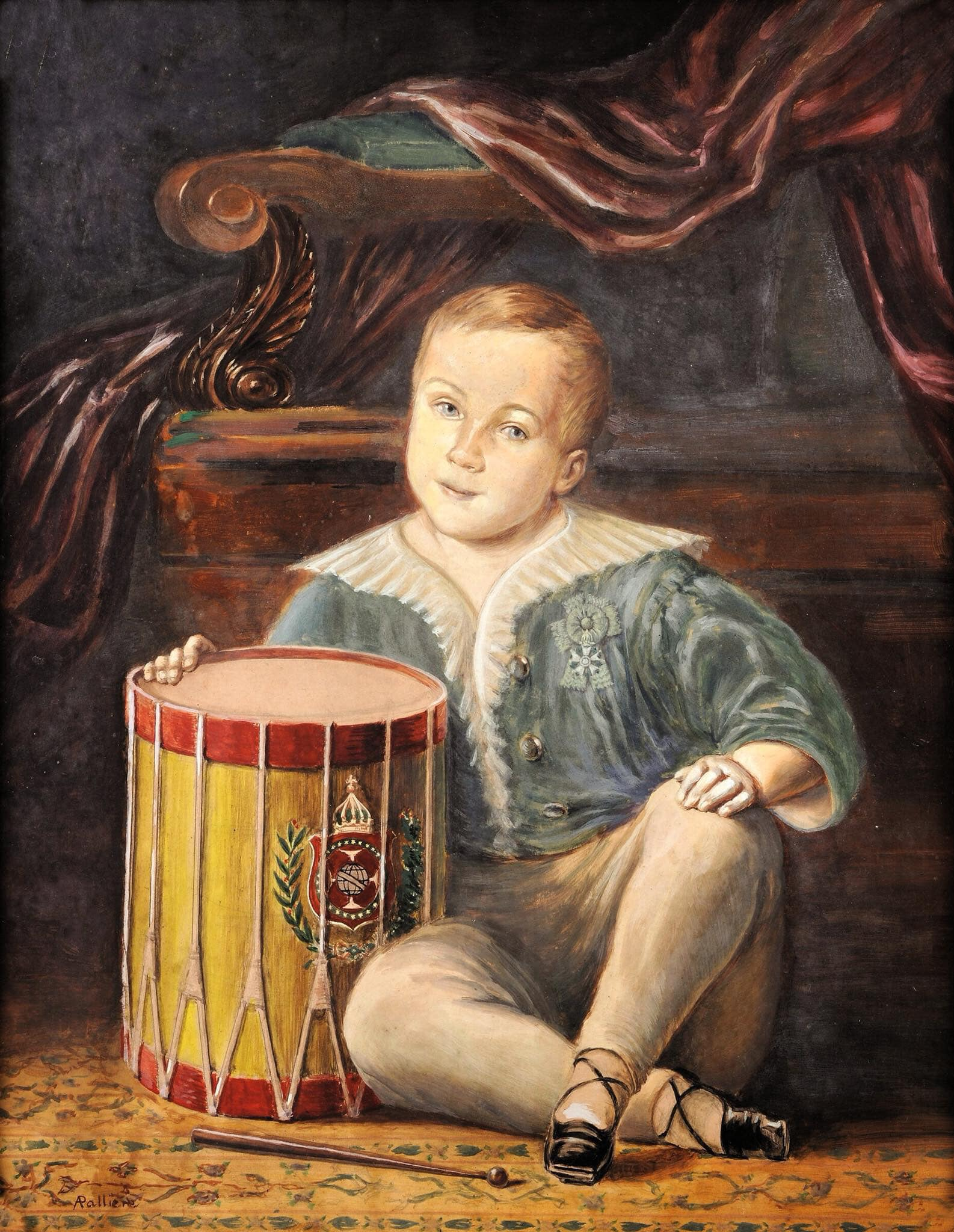
Pedro II, aged 4, 1830

The "Council of State" implemented the Moderating Power instituted by emperor Pedro I when he dissolved the Constituent Assembly that was tasked with drafting Brazil's first constitution right after its independence from Portugal. The Council of State was formed by lifetime members, which were appointed by the monarch and no more than ten in number. Their function was to be heard "in all serious and general measures of public administration, especially concerning the declaration of war, peace negotiations, negotiations with foreign nations, as well as on all occasions when the Emperor proposed to exercise any of the prerogatives of the Moderating Power" - and to which the liberals were strongly opposed.

The 1830 revolutions across Europe, which resulted in the overthrow of the French monarch Charles X, spread its liberal ideas to other nations, including Brazil. Liberal newspapers such as Aurora Fluminense, published by Evaristo da Veiga in Rio de Janeiro, started to appear in the country; in São Paulo, the death of liberal journalist Líbero Badaró severely steered public opinion against the emperor.

The liberals, divided between the "moderate" and the "exalted", sought Pedro I to secure a moderate ministry and disconnect it from the institutional framework inherited from his father, king John VI. They were opposed by the restorers, who defended its permanence. The emperor had made a trip to Minas Gerais, where he was received with apathy; upon returning to the court, he was received by the local Portuguese community in Rio de Janeiro with a nighttime demonstration of luminaries. The Brazilians reacted and the conflict known as the Night of the Bottle Fight took place. The emperor then dismissed all the ministers, which were of a moderate leaning, and replaced them with others that were perceived as absolutist; this inflamed public opinion even more against him.

Pedro I's reaction as a result of the popular unrest and the events that followed caused surprise even among the exalted liberals, as the emperor decided to abdicate in favor of his son at dawn on 7 April 1831. His opponents only wanted the restoration of the moderate ministry. The abdication led to the establishment of the regency.

== Provisional Triumviral Regency (1831) ==
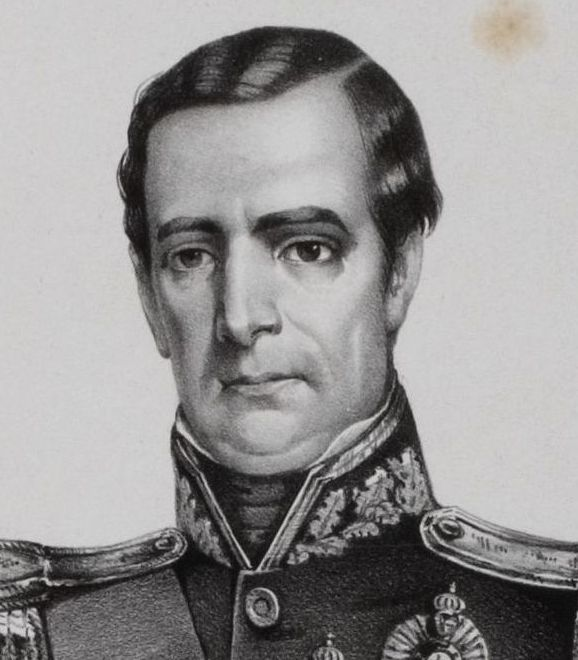
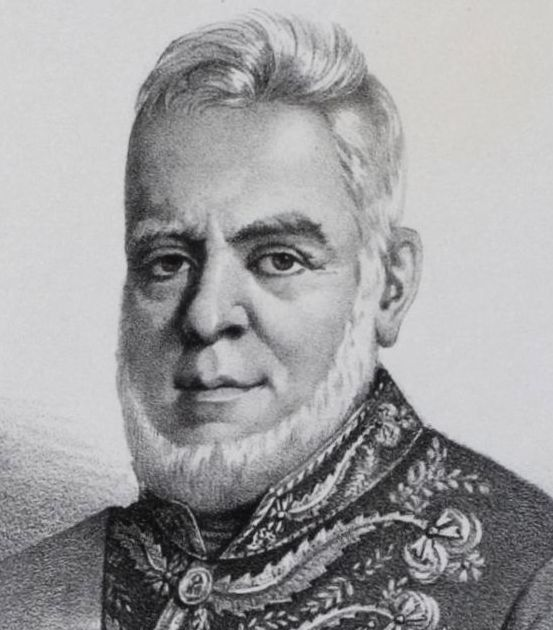
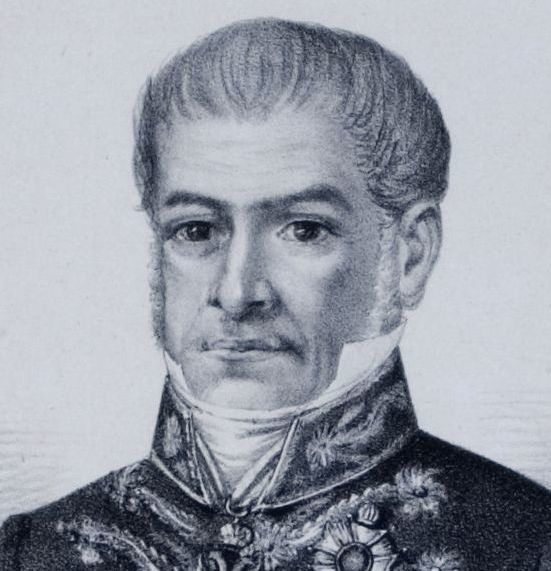
The provisional regents: Lima e Silva, Campos Vergueiro and Carneiro de Campos

Despite the parliamentary recess, within a few hours after Pedro I's abdication, the senators and deputies who were in the court met. They officially received the emperor's resignation in the Palace of the Senate from general Francisco de Lima e Silva. They then elected a provisional regency, consisting of three senators: Francisco de Lima e Silva, Nicolau Pereira de Campos Vergueiro and José Joaquim Carneiro de Campos. It was thus composed of a prestigious military officer, a liberal and a conservative, respectively. Such regency was provided for in title 5, chapter V, articles 121 to 130 of the Political Constitution of the Empire of Brazil.

As soon as it took office, one of the regency's first acts was to restore the ministers dismissed by Pedro I to their positions. It convened the Legislative Assembly, gave amnesty to political prisoners and removed suspicious and disorderly foreigners from the troops.

A manifesto was published in which the people were exhorted to maintain order, and further explaining the political and administrative guidelines of the new government. In it the governing board declared, with exaggeration, that its enemies "were so few and so weak, that they deserved no consideration; but that it watched over them as if they were many and strong". Despite efforts to restore order, the provisional regency could not prevent conflicts between soldiers and Portuguese supporters of the Restorer Party, which sought to restore Pedro I to the Brazilian throne, both in Rio de Janeiro and in the provinces.

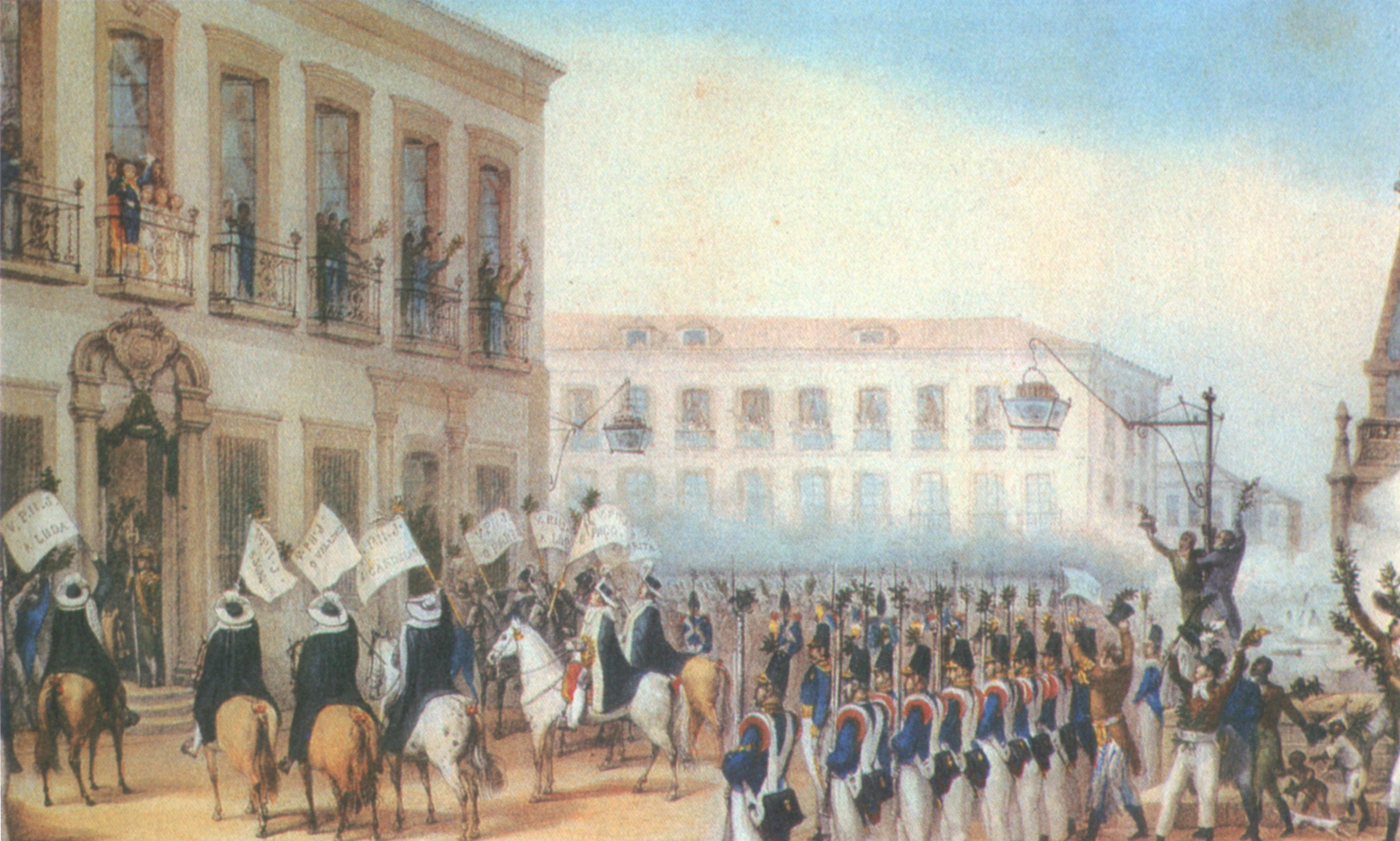
Acclamation of Pedro II, waving his handkerchief, on 9 April 1831, by Debret

Two days after the abdication, on 9 April, the young successor to the throne was acclaimed emperor. The board of regents took him to the Imperial Palace, where he was presented to the people. So young, the boy had to wave his handkerchief over a chair, in a scene that was portrayed by French painter Jean-Baptiste Debret. On the same day, the board issued an amnesty decree "to citizens convicted or even sentenced for political crimes and to military defendants convicted of crimes of desertion".

Pedro I had appointed José Bonifácio de Andrada e Silva, with whom he had reconciled after a troubled breakup, as his children's tutor. For the protection of the young emperor and his sisters, Francisca and Januária, who also remained in the country, the princes stayed in the palace of São Cristóvão or Boa Vista, then in the suburbs of the capital. A troubled period had begun, in which Brazil's territorial unity and the central authority were questioned and put to the test by several riots, revolts and rebellions.

José Bonifácio had asked French diplomat Edouard Pontois to support a possible transfer of the young prince, in case of need due to political instabilities, to São Paulo, where he would move the capital, obtaining an evasive response from the diplomat.

Pedro I had stayed in Brazilian waters until his return to Europe; initially boarded in an English frigate, it was in the French corvette Volage that the former emperor departed to Europe. On 13 April, the regency announced the former monarch's departure from Brazil and the people took to the streets to celebrate the "fall of the tyrant".

The provisional regency had to act immediately to contain the revolts that broke out in the provinces: in Bahia, under the pretext of old distrusts from the Brazilian War of Independence, Brazilians attacked Portuguese nationals. Likewise, the regency also had to act in Pernambuco and Minas Gerais.

The provisional character of this regency lasted until the election of a new triumviral regency, now "permanent", on 3 May 1831.

== Permanent Triumviral Regency (1831–1835) ==
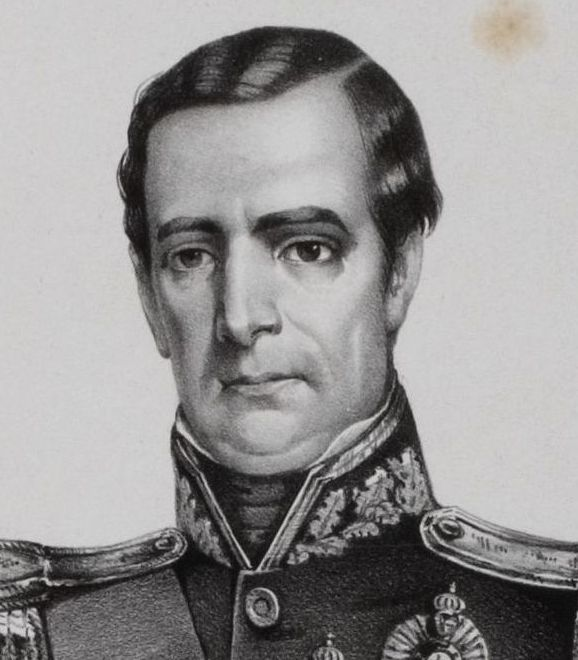
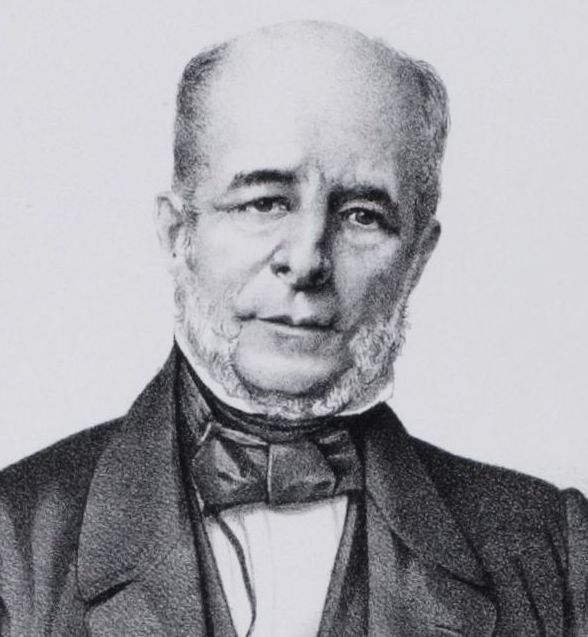
Two of the permanent regents: Lima e Silva and José da Costa Carvalho

On 17 June 1831, in the Palace of the Senate, with the Legislative General Assembly gathered and presided over by José Caetano da Silva Coutinho, a senator and bishop from São Paulo, the election of the Permanent Triumviral Regency took place. The elected regents were the deputies José da Costa Carvalho, from Bahia, João Bráulio Muniz, from Maranhão, and senator Francisco de Lima e Silva, from Rio de Janeiro. The election was based on article 123 of the 1824 Constitution. As the moderates made up the majority in the parliament, the elected regents were also adherents of this side, thus leaving out the exalted ones (in a large minority, especially in the Chamber of Deputies).

The composition of this triumvirate sought to maintain the balance of forces that already existed in the provisional regency: representing the north and northeast was João Bráulio Muniz, from Maranhão, who replaced Carneiro de Campos in this role; (Note: Bráulio Muniz had been a colleague of Costa Carvalho at the law school in the University of Coimbra, together with Bernardo Pereira de Vasconcelos, from Minas Gerais, his great friend since college; Muniz died at the end of his regency, which might be the reason for the lack of images that portray him.) the south and southeast were represented by Costa Carvalho who, despite being born in Bahia, lived in São Paulo, where he published the newspaper O Farol Paulistano. Lima e Silva was, therefore, the only one of the Provisional Regency who was re-elected as regent.

In its administration, the newly elected regency promoted the reforms of the Schools of Medicine in Rio and Salvador, converting them into faculties; the judicial branch was reorganized and the jury trial was established.

=== The liberal reform: limitations to the Moderating Power ===
Among the first measures that the liberal majority proposed was to reform the legislation that regulated the regency itself. This amendment was drafted by deputies Francisco de Paula Sousa e Melo, the regent Costa Carvalho, and Honório Hermeto Carneiro Leão, (Note: The same Honório Hermeto Carneiro Leão, together with the then regent Costa Carvalho, would ally themselves among the opponents of the liberal reforms they had introduced.) from Minas Gerais, and aimed at increasing the primacy of the Legislative branch over the Executive.

Through the reform, the moderating power came to be exercised by the regency itself, through the minister who was invested with such power, and its prerogatives were further reduced. Unlike when it was first instituted by emperor Pedro I, the prerogative to dismiss the Chamber of Deputies was removed, although this was already included in the changes made during the provisional regency, which also could not grant noble titles or decorations.

=== Creation of the National Guard ===
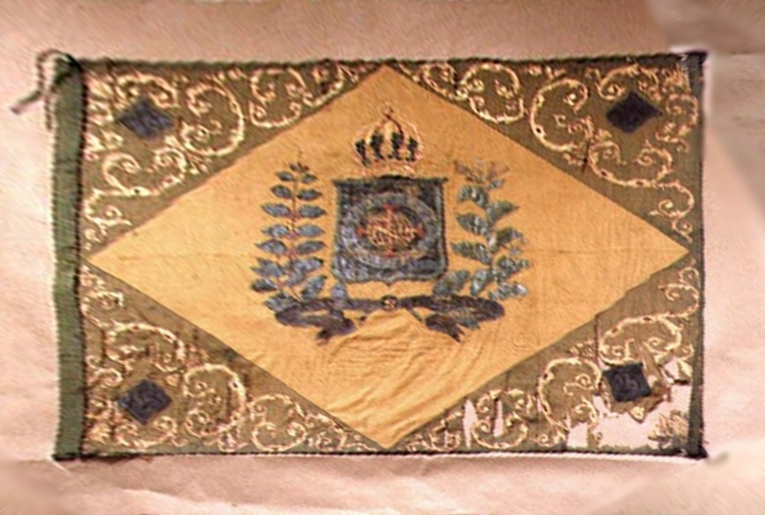
Flag of the National Guard in the province of São Paulo

One of the innovations instituted by the permanent regency was the creation of the National Guard, already in 1831. This military force relegated the Imperiral Brazilian Army to a secondary role and constituted the main public force with which the central power would seek to contain the riots that broke out. Its structure was based on the provinces, and it was subordinated to the provincial governments: first, the guard was linked to the jurisdiction of the justice of the peace, who was in charge of enlistment; after these it was subordinated to the criminal judges, to the presidents of the provinces and, finally, to the Minister of Justice.

All citizens between the ages of 21 and 60 who were eligible to vote were required to enlist; it was up to the government to supply them with weapons, but the uniforms were up to the enlisted men. Command positions were elective at each location. A model was sought that privileged the civic participation of the citizens, as occurred in the similar institution in France, which inspired the Brazilian one.

Its main role was the maintenance of the territorial unity of the Empire and the suppression of local revolts.

=== Political clashes – the Caramurus' agitations; the 30 July coup ===
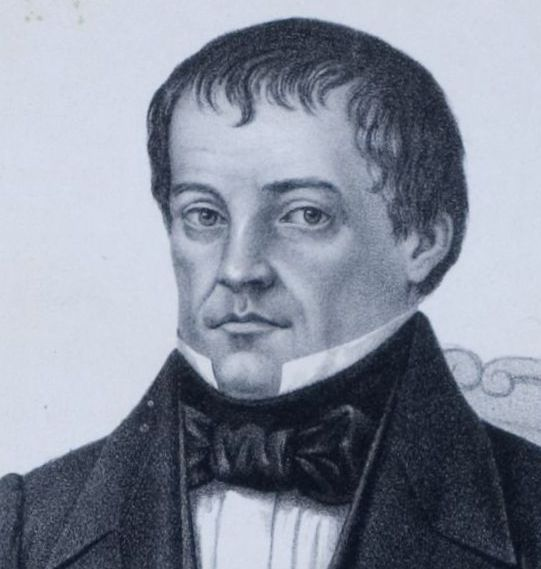
Diogo Feijó, minister of justice, resigned for failing to overthrow Bonifácio

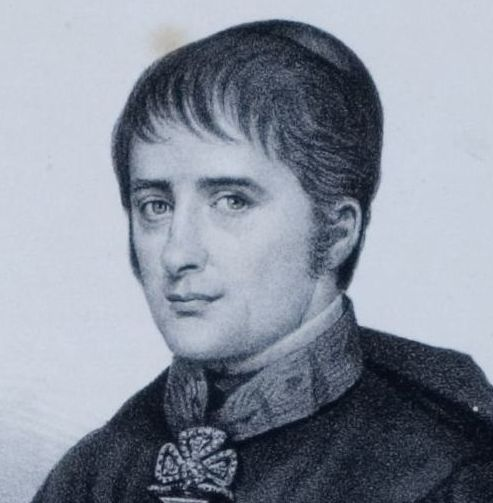
José Bento Leite Ferreira de Melo, one of the priests of the "Revolution of the 3 Priests"

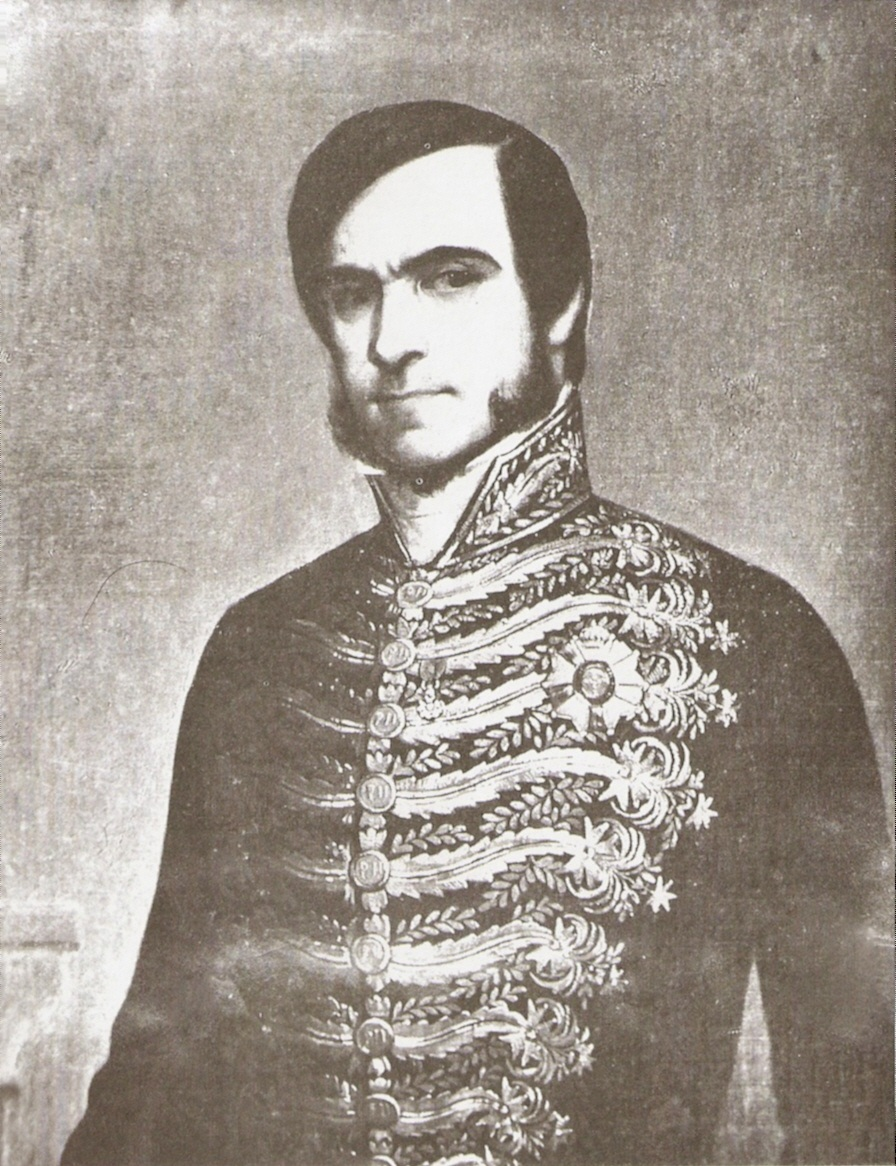
Honório Hermeto Carneiro Leão, stopped the 30 July coup

The regency found the country in serious difficulties, as a result of a serious financial crisis and unrest that threatened national unity. To face this situation, Diogo Antônio Feijó, also a deputy, was appointed as Minister of Justice.

The Moderate and the Exalted parties were later joined by the Restorer (its members were nicknamed caramurus), who preached the return of emperor Pedro I and was headed by José Bonifácio, who had recovered his previous political prestige by being appointed tutor to the young monarch.

Faced with nationwide instability, Feijó demanded that the regency give him written authorization that he would have full autonomy in the affairs of his ministry, so that he could face the riots that broke out, especially in Rio de Janeiro. Part of the unrest, provoked by José Bonifácio and the caramurus, aimed to destabilize the regency. On 3 April 1832, a revolt broke out in the capital, in the midst of many political intrigues; blaming Bonifácio for the agitations, Feijó demanded his resignation from his position of tutor, having declared: "either José Bonifácio leaves the tutorship or I leave the ministry of justice".

The deputies, with a moderate majority, were in favor of the dismissal requested by Feijó; but the Senate, where Bonifácio still enjoyed prestige and had a conservative majority, rejected, by a difference of just one vote, the bill to dismiss Bonifácio; Feijó then presented his resignation on 5 April.

In his office Feijó acted with great rigor and efficiency. He also had the Feijó Law approved, which provided for the liberation of slaves who came from outside the empire, but whose effectiveness was null.

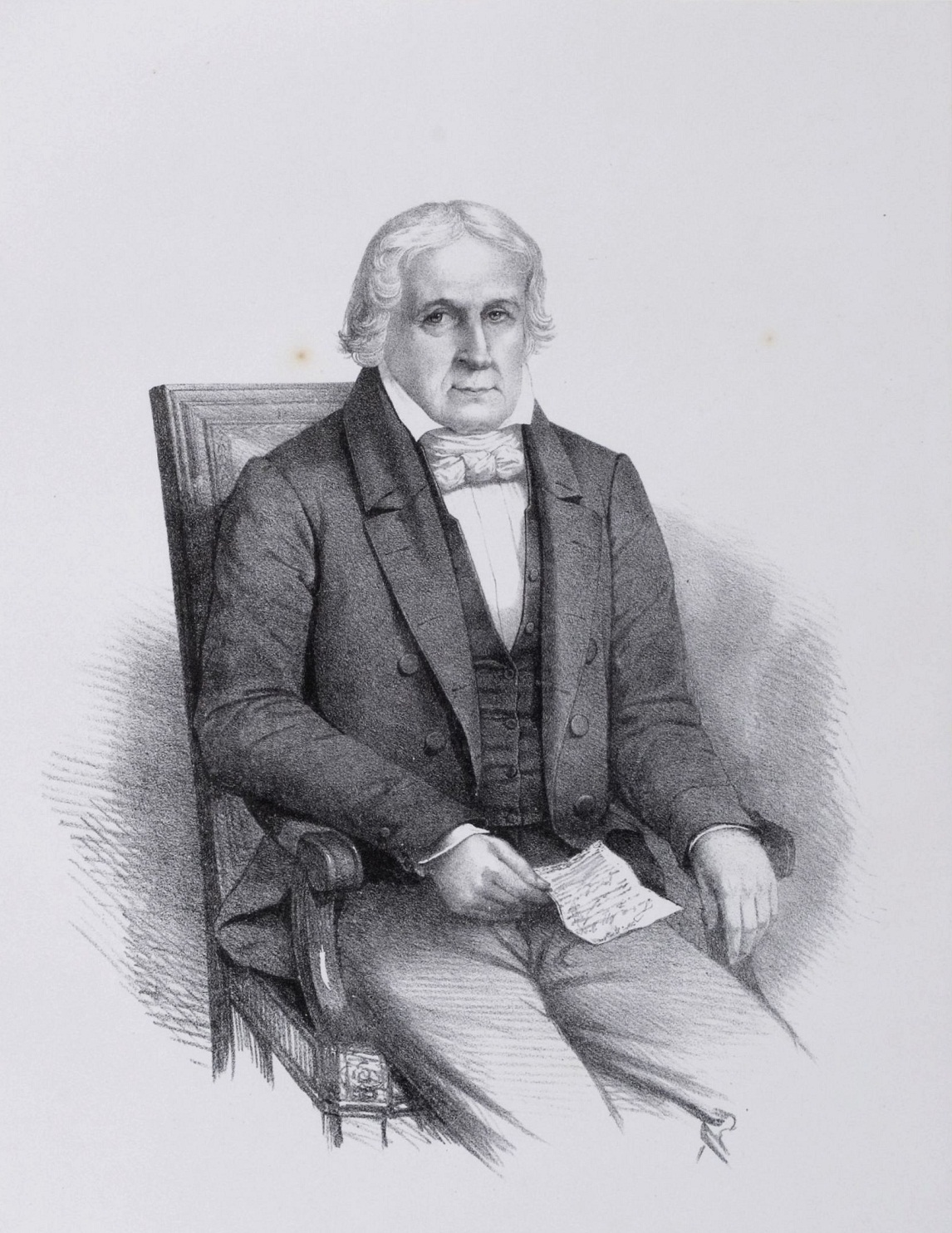
Bonifácio lost prestige with the death of Pedro I and was arrested

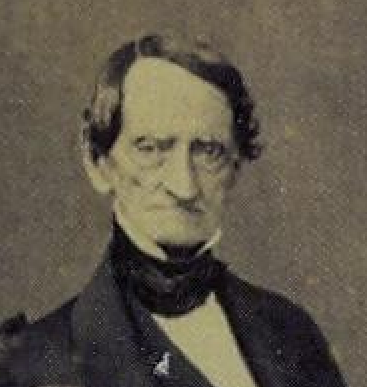
The Marquis of Itanhaém replaced José Bonifácio as tutor of emperor Pedro II

Despite now being outside the government, Feijó made a new attempt to make moderate reforms prosper in the episode that became known as the 30 July coup. Counting on the help of priest José Bento Leite Ferreira de Melo in the typography where Melo edited the newspaper O Pregoeiro Constitucional – a liberal newspaper that opposed Pedro I – the Constitution of Pouso Alegre was printed, a new constitution that brought the amendments that dragged on in the General Assembly, and that the coup planned to approve.

The coup failed, as it lacked the support of the deputies, most of whom were averse to adopting measures that contradicted the constitutional order itself. The then unknown town of Pouso Alegre, a few years prior known simply as Arraial de Mandu, became known throughout Brazil, thanks to the figure of priest José Bento, who had gained notoriety. In addition to Feijó, who was a catholic priest himself, and José Bento, there was a third priest, José Custódio Dias, who lent his estate to serve as the location to the preparations for the plot. This led the coup to also be called the "Revolution of the Three Priests".

In addition to the approval of the Constitution of Pouso Alegre, the priests wanted to remove José Bonifácio from the post of tutor of the future monarch. The coup's failure was in great part thanks to Honório Hermeto Carneiro Leão, the Marquis of Paraná, who acted as the most important dissent figure among the liberals, and the one who sought to dissuade his peers from supporting the initiative, mainly for fear that the act could serve as an example to other breaches of legality.

Fearful that José Bonifácio would use the young monarch as a guarantee to attempt new coups, the regents demanded that he would not leave the Imperial Palace. Despite this, Bonifácio took Pedro II and his sisters to the Palace of São Cristóvão. Aureliano Coutinho, who had replaced Feijó in the Ministry of Justice, demanded Bonifácio's return, which he disobeyed. On 15 December 1833, José Bonifácio was finally dismissed. Manuel Inácio de Andrade, the Marquis of Itanhaém, was appointed to the position of Royal Tutor to replace Bonifácio. One of the key figures behind Bonifácio's dismissal and imprisonment was Cândido de Araújo Viana.

José Bonifácio was then arrested and later sent to the Paquetá Island, where he remained in his beach house. After his trial, he was finally acquitted of the charges; however, Bonifácio did not recover from this last blow, dying a few years later in Niterói.

=== The 1834 Additional Act ===
The Additional Act was a direct result of the liberal majority in the Chamber of Deputies, which preached greater autonomy for the provinces and was a programmatic goal of the liberals. Thus, the regency proposed that the 1824 Constitution be amended.

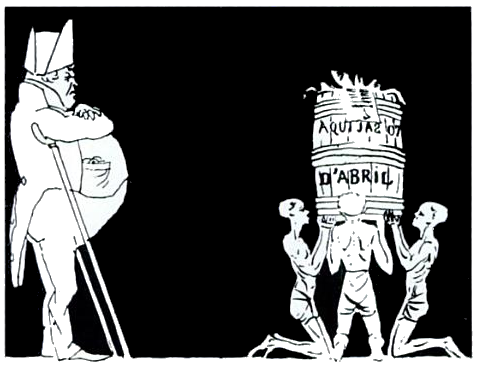
Caricature of the time showing Bernardo Pereira de Vasconcelos burying the political advances of 7 April 1831

The bill for the constitutional amendment had been proposed in 1831 by a commission consisting mostly of liberal deputies from the province of São Paulo; it included Francisco de Paula Sousa e Melo and José Cesário de Miranda Ribeiro. The initial proposal contained quite radical changes, in the sense of expanding provincial power, these included: the election of a sole regent by the provincial assemblies, as well as the senators; the senators would lose their status of senators for life; the Executive's veto power would be limited, and could be overthrown by a simple majority in the parliament. The point of greatest controversy, however, was the insertion in Article 1 of the constitution of the words "the government of the Empire of Brazil shall be a federative monarchy".

The Senate reacted through amendments that altered the text originated in the Chamber; those that were rejected had to be considered in a joint session of the two houses and, in it, the senators managed to block the insertion of the federal system in Article 1 and maintain their lifetime status.

Ratified on 12 August 1834, the Additional Act adapted federalist principles to the monarchy. Its main writer was deputy Bernardo Pereira de Vasconcelos, who had been a colleague and friend of two of the regents from his college days in the University of Coimbra, and was one of the most influential deputies. Among its biggest innovations were:

1. The creation of Legislative Assemblies in the provinces. This body replaced the former General Councils and legislated on local civil, judicial and religious organization, on public education, expropriations, civil servants, municipal politics and economy, transport and public works;
2. The creation of the Neutral Municipality as a territory dismembered from the province of Rio de Janeiro, which should have its seat and government elsewhere than in the city of Rio, as well as the Assembly, choosing for that purpose the village of Praia Grande, which was later elevated to city with the name of Niterói;
3. The establishment of the vote for the election of a single regent with a term of office of 4 years;
4. The extinction of the Council of State.

Historian João Batista Ribeiro de Andrade Fernandes remarked that politics then took a new direction, with a supremacy of the Moderate Party:

"The most complete expression of this policy is found in the Additional Act that satisfied the local demands by creating provincial assemblies and abolished the Council of State while reinforcing the authority of the central government by reducing the regents to a single one; with great prudence it was possible to prevent the fragmentation of the country, which was the adoption of elected presidents for the provinces and thus other radical proposals did not find approval".

== The sole regency of Diogo Antônio Feijó ==
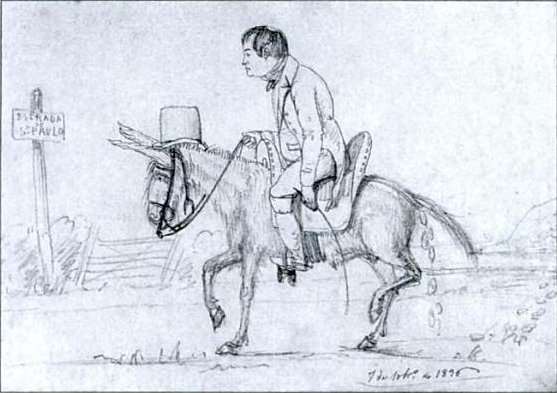
Satire by Araújo Porto-Alegre showing Feijó returning on a mule to São Paulo after resigning

In 1835, the first election to choose the sole regent took place. The candidates were the exalted Antônio Francisco de Paula de Holanda Cavalcanti de Albuquerque, from Pernambuco, and Diogo Antônio Feijó, from São Paulo, from the Moderate Party; the latter emerged victorious, obtaining about six thousand votes. Feijó's regency lasted from 12 October 1835 to 19 September 1837.

Feijó faced difficulties from the beginning; among his opponents stood out Bernardo Pereira de Vasconcelos, Honório Hermeto Carneiro Leão and Maciel Monteiro. To face them, Feijó unsuccessfully tried to create a new party, the Progressist. His opponents, however, succeeded in founding the Regressive Party (consisting of the former restorers and liberals and was the basis of the future Conservative Party). Feijó also did not have the support of the Holy See, as he was a defender of the end of celibacy for the catholic priests, and for having insisted on launching his friend Manuel Maria de Moura as a candidate for bishop of Rio de Janeiro, who had already been refused by the pope.

With skill, however, his policy gave way in some points, such as having accepted decentralization proposals; he tried to satisfy the peoples and provincial demands, without, however, strengthening the aristocrats or the parliament; and, finally, he acted rigorously in repelling merchants and large landowners. Despite depending on the parliament, he was not obedient to it.

His regency was marked by the beginning of two of the most serious internal conflicts in Brazil: the Cabanagem, in Pará, and Ragamuffin War, in Rio Grande do Sul, in addition to other local revolts.

With a fragile health, Feijó was discouraged and without the same energy that he had at the head of the Ministry of Justice. Feijó ended up becoming unpopular for his intransigence and lost the support of his great ally Evaristo da Veiga, who had died prematurely. Feijó was unable to form the ministry he wanted, and ended up resigning from the position of regent.

=== Araújo Lima's interim regency ===
On the eve of his resignation, Feijó had appointed the conservative Pedro de Araújo Lima as Minister of the Empire. Lima formed, as interim regent, the so-called "Ministry of Capabilities", which obtained a relative order and a certain economic development; this enabled him to run for regent in the elections that were held in April 1838.

Among the main achievements of his interim regency was the foundation of the Colégio Pedro II, in 1837.

== The sole regency of Araújo Lima ==
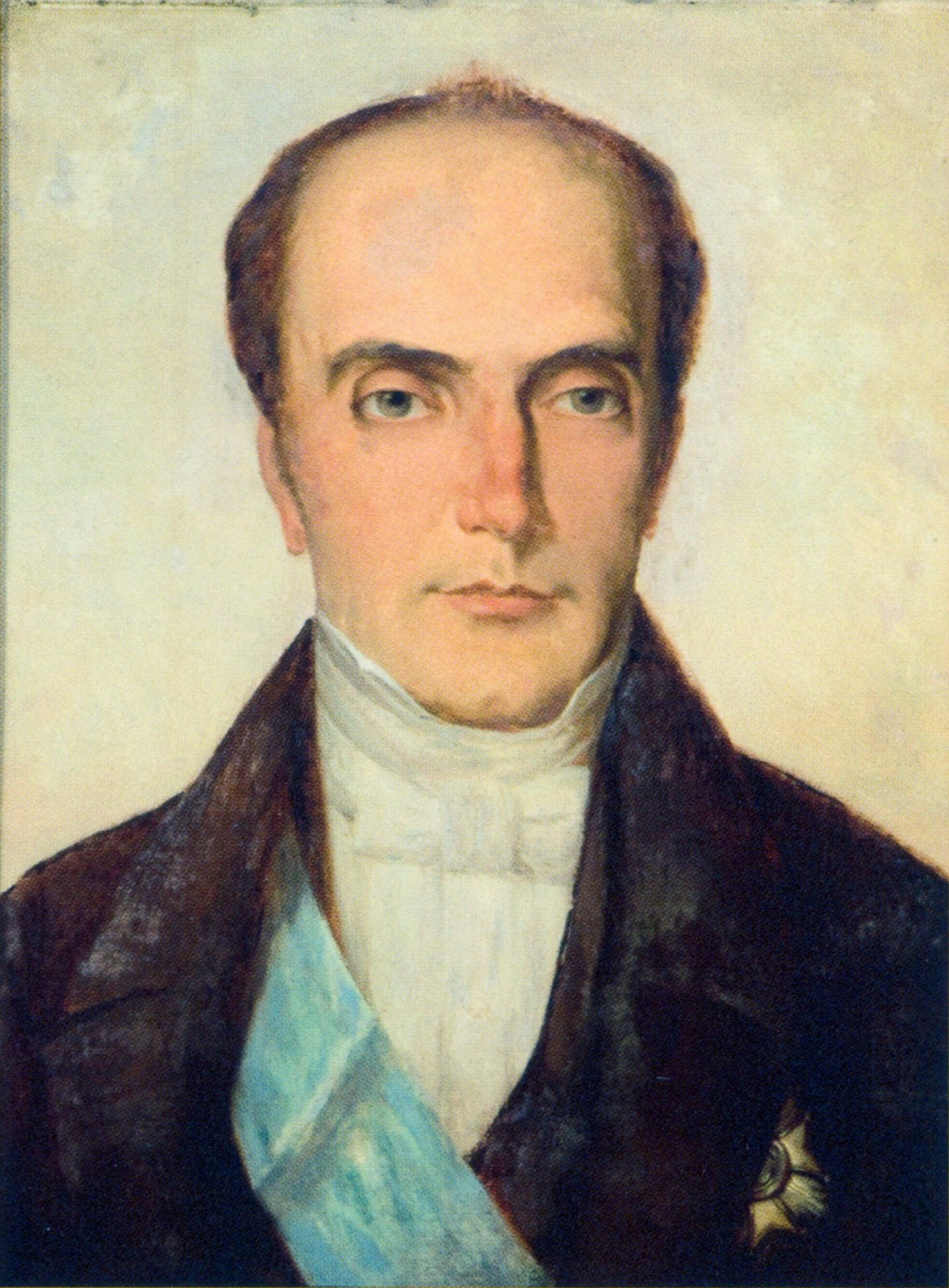
The sole regent Pedro de Araújo Lima, from Pernambuco, a "calm, thoughtful and tolerant" conservative

After his interim period, Pedro de Araújo Lima ran for office in the elections that took place in April 1838. Running with him was, once again, Antônio Francisco de Paula de Holanda Cavalcanti de Albuquerque, whom Lima easily defeated.

During his regency, the Brazilian Historic and Geographic Institute was founded and the Military School was reformed. Araújo Lima represented the end of liberal policies, with the suppression of the Criminal Procedure Code and the Additional Act, the latter being later made official by the so-called Interpretative Law of the Additional Act, approved on 12 May 1840, which increased the centralization of power, decreasing provincial and municipal autonomy, by controlling the police and the judiciary.

Although he did not face the turmoil that had troubled the previous governments, Araújo Lima had to deal with the Ragamuffin War, which continued to rage in southern Brazil, the Cabanagem, in Grão-Pará, and also other provincial revolts: the Sabinada, in Bahia, and the Balaiada, in Maranhão. His government promoted intense repression of the rebels. In Bahia and Maranhão there was great violence.

Political disputes in parliament increased in the second year of his government, which resulted in the declaration of age of emperor Pedro II and, consequently, in the end of the regency period.

Araújo Lima was, in the words of historian Octávio Tarquínio de Sousa:

"The constitutional king that Feijó didn't know how to be, but knew how to choose".

Or yet:

"It could be said that the continued exercise of the presidency of the Chamber of Deputies had given him the habit of a spectator, or rather, of an arbitrator, making him willing to act only as the mediator, who composes, accommodates and prevents clashes and disagreements".

== Main rebellions during the regency ==
The regencies had to face four of the largest rebellions in Brazil.

Several rebellions broke out during the regency period, seen by historiography in general from two approaches: a more conservative one, which portrays them as mere "disorders", and another that seeks to boast that they had "popular causes".

Among the rebellions there were three slave revolts: the Carrancas Revolt in Minas Gerais (1833), the Malê Revolt in Salvador (1835) and the Manuel Congo revolt in Rio de Janeiro (1838). In a period of nine years, rebellions broke out in almost all of Brazil, most of them resulting from the dissatisfaction of the regional elites allied with the urban middle class (made up of liberal workers such as journalists, officials and the military) who, dissatisfied with the central power in Rio de Janeiro, protested against the economic hardships, the increase of taxes and the appointment of governors without local support.

The main rebellions of the period were:

=== Cabanada (1832–1835) ===
It broke out in Pernambuco, among the poorer strata of the population - called cabanos, as in the Cabanagem in Pará - and was caused mainly by the misunderstanding of the humble classes in face of the changes in the regime resulting from the abdication of Pedro I, which is why they had support from Recife's restorers.

With religious ideals, the Cabanada was finally defeated in 1835 by Manuel de Carvalho Pais de Andrade - the same officer who, in 1824, proclaimed the Confederation of the Equator and presided over the province.

=== Malê revolt (1835) ===
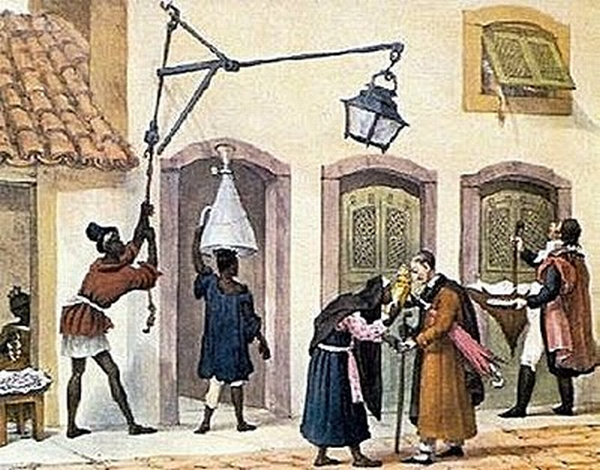
Debret: slaves in liberal jobs (street vendors, lamp lighters, water sellers); a priest receives alms from a black man

Half the population of the city of Salvador consisted of blacks who carried out profitable activities for their masters, in professions such as tailors, carpenters or street vendors. In January 1835, Muslim slaves, then called malês, organized a revolt that had an intense reaction from the government, which decimated them.

It was the largest of the country's urban slave uprisings, although it lasted less than a day; around 600 slaves took over the capital, most of them literate in Arabic and in the religious context of a jihad. In the intense fighting 70 slaves died, and about 500 were arrested and sentenced to lashes, imprisonment or death.

Its main effect, along with the other slave uprisings of the period, was to sow fear in the ruling class, which reacted in two ways: on the one hand, it reinforced repressive laws and, on the other, it opened the debate on the slavery issue.

=== Cabanagem (1835–1840) ===
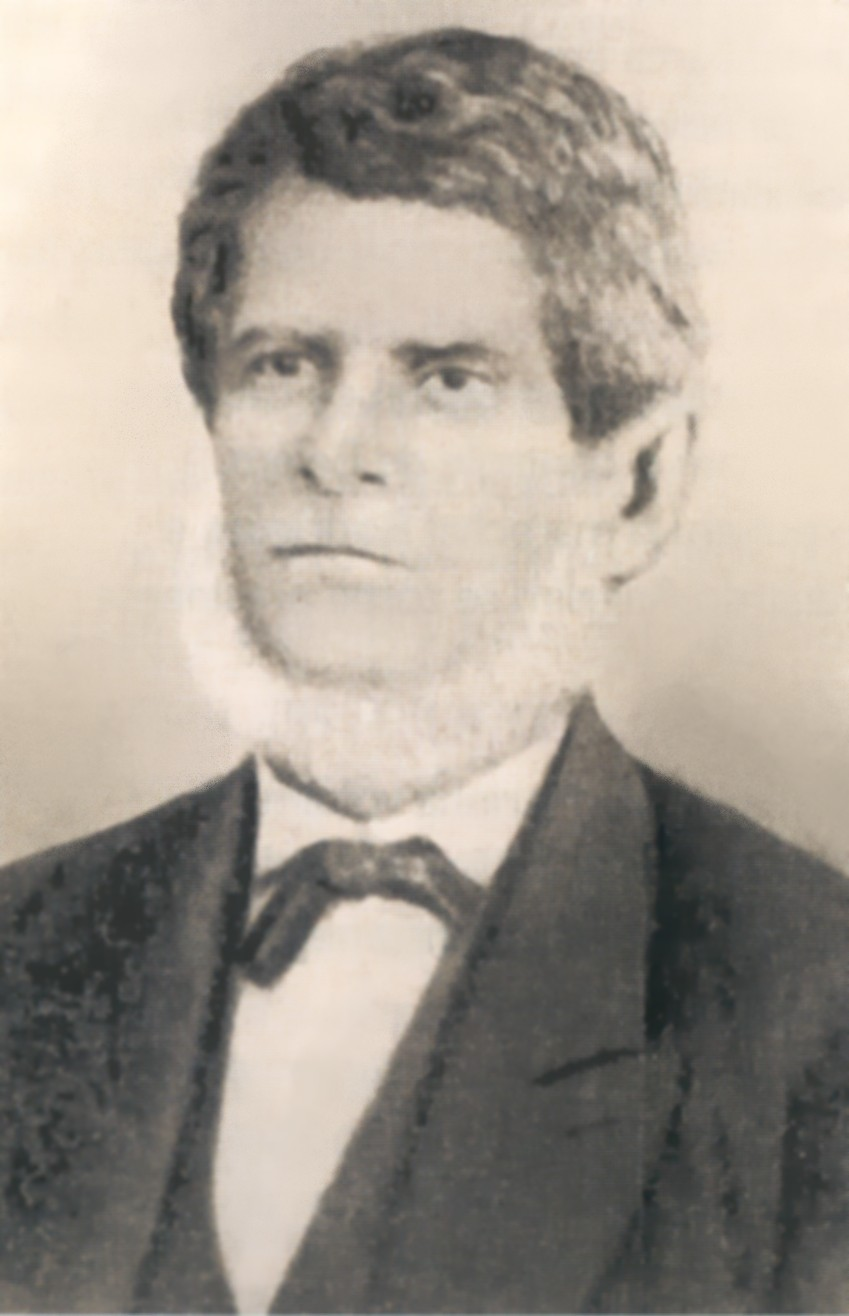
Angelim, years after leading the Cabanagem

The rebellion began in 1835 in Belém, then a small city with 12,000 inhabitants, of which very few were white. The majority was of indigenous people, slaves and mestizos. After disagreements among the elites over the choice of the new president of the province, which, at the time, had very few ties with the central government in Rio de Janeiro, independence was proclaimed.

Belém was then attacked by troops made up mostly of mestizos, amerindians and blacks, among which Eduardo Angelim, from Ceará, stood out as leader. Angelim had migrated to the province of Grão-Pará after a great drought in his home province and was then 21 years old.

Called cabanos, the rebels had the goal of restoring Pará to Brazil, defending Pedro II as monarch and fighting foreigners. The result of five years of fighting, in which the loyalists won, was the death of an estimated 20% of the local population of the province, its economic destructuring and the destruction of the capital.

=== Ragamuffin War (1835–1845) ===
The Ragamuffin War was the largest and longest lasting of the rebellions that broke out during the regency period, even extending beyond it up until 1845.

Its immediate economic cause was the increase in taxes in the Rio Grande do Sul province, which directly affected ranchers who were already dissatisfied with competition from Argentine and Uruguayan producers.

On 20 September 1835, the city of Porto Alegre was taken by rebels. The rebels later proclaimed their independence as the Riograndense Republic. The leader of the rebels, Bento Gonçalves, was imprisoned and sent to Salvador, from where he managed to escape and return to his province, ruling it in 1837. Under the command of Giuseppe Garibaldi, the Juliana Republic was proclaimed in Santa Catarina, united in a confederation with the Riograndense Republic.

The regencies were not able to put an end to this uprising. It was only defeated during the Second Reign, when emperor Pedro II was already of age.

=== Sabinada (1837–1838) ===
The rebellion began in Salvador, on 7 November 1837, and was named after one of its leaders, the doctor Francisco Sabino. It achieved initial success, after the uprising that began at the São Pedro fort, which spread to the other garrisons, causing the authorities to flee, including the president of the province, Francisco de Sousa Paraíso.

A provisional government was then formed, within the context of a Bahian Republic, which however would be interim until the emperor Pedro II came of age. This provoked controversies among historians about the actual liberal and republican character of the movement.

The government remained inoperative, under the presidency of vice-governor João Carneiro da Silva Rego; at the beginning of January of the following year their positions were being lost, until the final defeat with the military occupation of the city on March 13, which lasted until shortly after the emperor was declared of age. About 1,800 rebels died, after the hand-to-hand fights.

=== Balaiada (1838–1841) ===
The movement that took place in Maranhão had an economic cause: the crisis in cotton production, which came to erupt in a revolt of slaves and cattle herders from the large farms, in December 1838, with the support of the urban liberals, who opposed the landowners.

Having as its main leader Manuel Francisco dos Anjos Ferreira, a basket (Portuguese: balaio) maker, from which it gained its name. The movement also had as leaders Cosme Bento and Raimundo Gomes. In 1839, the rebels took over the city of Caxias, while the escaped slaves settled in quilombos in the jungle. The confrontations lasted for 3 years, causing enormous damage to the farmers, but they remained without a common political leader to organize them, being finally defeated by the reaction of the elites, with the support of imperial troops under the command of then colonel Luís Alves de Lima e Silva, future Duke of Caxias.

== Government structure ==
The Executive power in the Regency had inherited the existing structure for the ministerial body from the United Kingdom of Portugal, Brazil and the Algarves, with changes made shortly before independence, or shortly after it.

In 1808, when the Portuguese court fled to Brazil, there were only 3 ministries: the Kingdom (which took care of the treasury), the Navy and Overseas, and that of War and Foreigners.

By the decree of 22 April 1821, foreign affairs began to be housed in the Ministry of the Kingdom, while the Ministry of Overseas became the new Ministry of the Navy; the same decree also created the Finance ministry, increasing the total to 4: Kingdom and Foreigners, War, Navy and Finance.

The Ministry of Justice was created in a letter of law of August 23 of that same year, dismembered from the ministry of the Kingdom, increasing the number of ministries to 5 - a number that was initially maintained at the time of independence, in 1822, changing the name of the Kingdom Ministry to Empire. However, on 13 November 1823, the ministry of Foreigners was separated as an autonomous ministry from the Empire.

Six, therefore, were the ministries that made up the government during the regencies, which were composed of a total of 13 cabinets for the duration of the regency.

The regency period kept in its core the seeds of the two parties that would succeed each other in power during the reign of emperor Pedro II: the Conservative - composed mostly of magistrates, bureaucrats, large Portuguese-majority merchants and rural landowners from states such as Bahia, Rio de Janeiro and Pernambuco - and the Liberal, formed mainly by some priests, the urban middle class and landowners from provinces such as Rio de Janeiro, São Paulo and Rio Grande do Sul.

These two currents emerged during the election to choose a sole regent, with two opposing candidacies. Alongside Diogo Antônio Feijó were the exalted liberals and part of the moderates; the candidate Holanda Cavalcanti was joined by part of the moderates, the former restorers allied to the Andrada brothers, led by Bernardo de Vasconcelos, from Minas Gerais.

The liberals won the government with Feijó, while the conservatives succeeded him with Araújo Lima, when the liberals achieved success with the declaration of age of emperor Pedro II.

== Culture during the regency ==
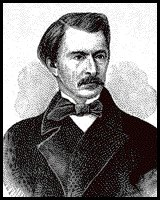
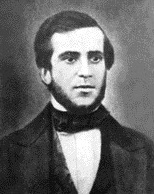
The romantic writers Gonçalves de Magalhães and Martins Pena

A local romanticism movement began to gain attraction in Brazil during the regency period, under European influence, but keeping local elements. It sought to create a literature with typically local figures, such as the amerindians.

The inaugural "landmark" of Brazilian romanticism belongs to Gonçalves de Magalhães with the publication, in 1836, of the compilation of poems Suspiros Poéticos e Saudades, in the middle of the regency period.

Magalhães produced dramatic texts, while others such as Martins Pena dedicated themselves with greater emphasis to theater and the comedy of manners, in which the actor João Caetano, creator of a theater company at the Court, stood out. The public initially reacted negatively to these plays, which denounced British dominance in the local economy, corruption and social abuses.

Education already had, in 1827, a General Law, which established the creation of primary schools in all villages, establishing the salary for the teachers and the subjects to be taught; the Additional Act of 1834 decentralized school administration: the provinces would be responsible for elementary and secondary education and the Crown would be responsible for higher education. It was in this context that the Colégio Pedro II was founded.

== Justice ==
Although the death penalty existed throughout the imperial period, it was during the regency that it was most widely carried out; The Criminal Code, approved in 1830, and the Criminal Procedure Code, of 1832, treated free men and slaves alike, but in 1835, the Carrancas Revolt, which took place two years earlier in Minas Gerais, caused a law to be passed on the 10th of June that made the situation of slaves different.

The new law allowed capital punishment to be applied by a decision of two thirds of the jurors and no longer the unanimity required by the codes, for crimes exclusively committed by slaves (such as murdering, poisoning or harming the master, his wife, ascendants or descendants, the administrator, the overseer, etc. or participating in an insurrection); the penalty could not be appealed.

Although the Moderating power allowed the ruler to commute the death penalty to another, this almost never occurred during the regency period, with the result that it was at this time that prisoners in Brazil were most easily executed, most of them slaves.

== Press in the regency period ==
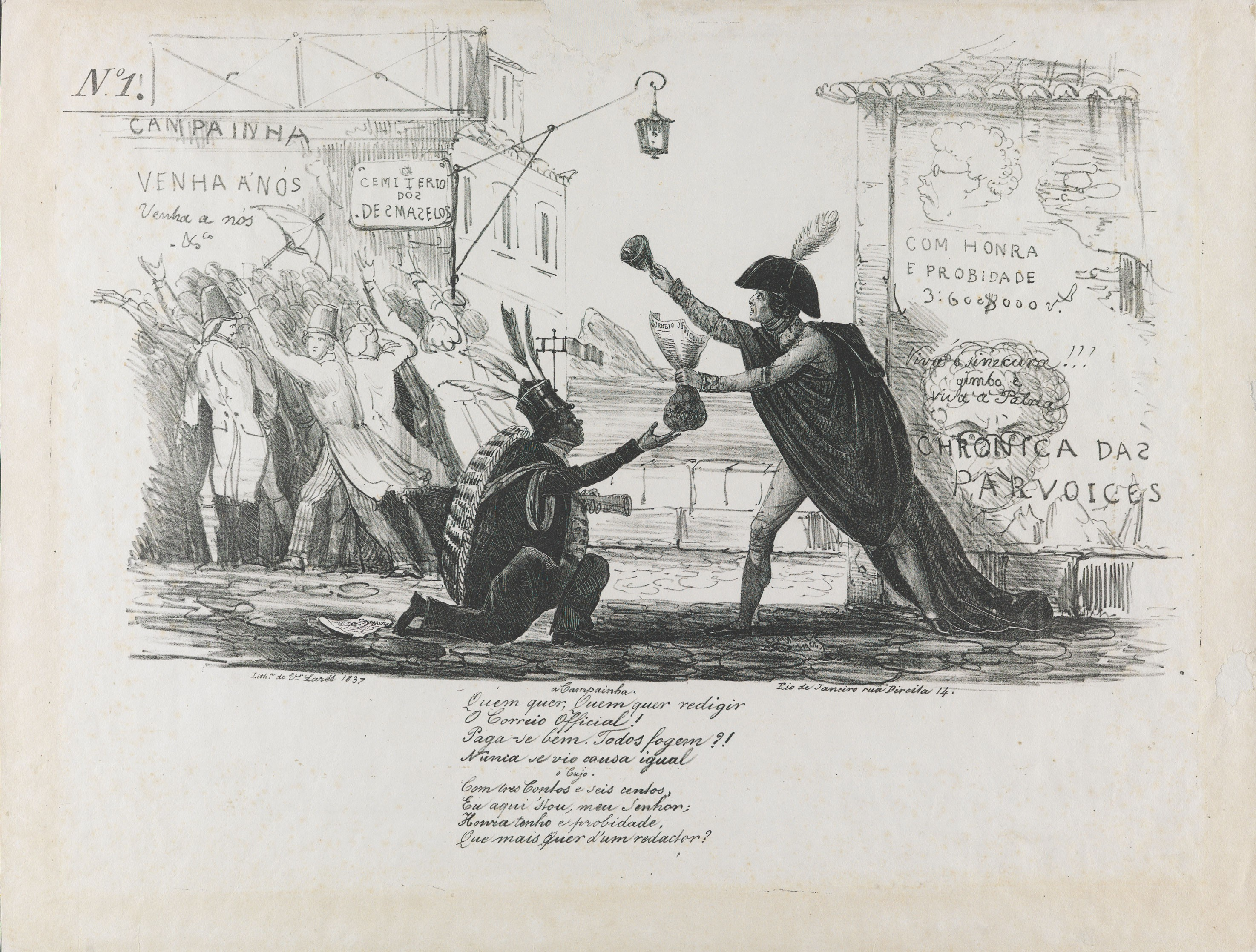
The first caricature made in Brazil, by Araújo Porto-Alegre, in 1837

The press experienced a growth hitherto unseen in Brazil. In 1837 Manuel de Araújo Porto-Alegre published the first caricature in Brazil, portraying the disputes that took place within the regencies; the lithograph shows Justiniano José da Rocha, a journalist who was hired for a large salary to be the editor of the Correio Oficial and, in the engraving, appears on his knees receiving a bag of money from the governor.

In Recife, the newspaper O Carapuceiro, which circulated from 1832 to 1942, is a paradigm of the press of the period, especially in the provinces. There social criticism, as well as political criticism, in which the declared objective was to publish their observations that would serve as a hood to whomever they could, were published; its editor and redactor, Miguel do Sacramento Lopes Gama, would go down in history by the nickname of Father Carapuceiro.

Although in Europe the growth of print runs made it possible in the 1830s to create literary and scientific magazines, and the publication of novels in periodicals, (Note: This was the case, in France, of the magazines that brought together authors such as Balzac, Alexandre Dumas, Victor Hugo, among others, and the dissemination of the so-called feuilleton novels, written to popular taste. Also in Portugal Alexandre Herculano and others published magazines at this time) this phenomenon still lingered in the Brazil, where newspapers were, before, engaged in the political disputes between the parties and factions in formation - and this type of publication only came to light in the country when these disputes settled down, during the Second Reign: until then, political disputes and the partisanship of the press prevailed.

The press of the time, therefore, had as its main objective the formation of opinion, intervening directly in political life. An exception was the magazine Niterói, edited in France by Francisco de Sales Torres Homem, Gonçalves de Magalhães and Manuel de Araújo Porto-Alegre, in 1836, whose declared purpose was to show Brazilian literature, arts and economy. It is considered a precursor of romanticism in Brazil.

A noteworthy fact is the existence of newspapers aimed at blacks and mestizos, which appeared during the Permanent Regency, whose titles made clear the public they were addressed to: O Crioulinho, O Homem de Cor ou o Mulato and O Brasileiro Pardo, which discussed racial issues.

== See also ==
- List of Brazilian regents
