= List of Brazilian regents =

This is a list of Brazilian regents, a regent, from Latin regens, "one who reigns", is a person selected to act as head of state (ruling or not) because the ruler is a minor, not present, or debilitated.

== Reign of Maria I ==
Portrait	Name	Regency start	Regency end
Regent during the incapacitation of Queen Maria I
	John, Prince of Brazil	16 December 1815	20 March 1816; Death of Queen Maria I

== Reign of John VI ==
Portrait	Name	Regency start	Regency end
Regent after King John VI left Brazil
	Pedro, Prince Royal	22 April 1821	12 October 1822; Independence of Brazil

== Reign of Pedro II ==
=== Regents during the minority of Emperor Pedro II ===
The regencies took place from 1831 to 1840, between the abdication of Pedro I of Brazil until the majority of Pedro II legally declared by the Senate at the age of 14 on July 23, 1840.

Portrait	Name	Regency start	Regency end
Provisional Triumviral Regency
	Francisco de Lima e Silva; Nicolau Vergueiro; José Carneiro de Campos	7 April 1831	18 June 1831
Permanent Triumviral Regency
	Francisco de Lima e Silva; João Bráulio Muniz; José da Costa Carvalho	18 June 1831	12 October 1835
Regency of Priest Feijó
	Diogo Antônio Feijó	12 October 1835	18 September 1837
Regency of Araújo Lima
	Pedro de Araújo Lima	19 September 1837	23 July 1840

=== Women heads of state during the Empire ===
In addition to the regencies listed above, two other people held the Head of State of Brazil during the imperial period, Maria Leopoldina and Isabel, Princess Imperial of Brazil. D. Leopoldina who acted as regent in 1822 and had a great influence on Brazil's independence process, having been responsible for signing the decree that separated Brazil from Portugal.

D. Isabel, heir presumptive to the throne, who was Regent of Brazil in various periods (1870–1871, 1876–1877 and 1887–1888) while her father, Emperor Pedro II, performed foreign visits. During her last regency she sanctioned on 13 May 1888, the Golden Law (Imperial Law n.º 3.353), which was the law that extinguished slavery in Brazil, considered a great milestone in the history of Brazil.

Portrait	Women regents	Monarch
	Maria Leopoldina of Austria	Pedro I of Brazil
	Isabel, Princess Imperial of Brazil	Pedro II of Brazil

== See also ==
- Regency
- List of regents
- President of Brazil
- Prime Minister of Brazil
- Monarchy of Brazil
- Regency period (Empire of Brazil)
