= José da Costa Carvalho, Marquis of Monte Alegre =

Brazilian politician

Marquis of Monte Alegre
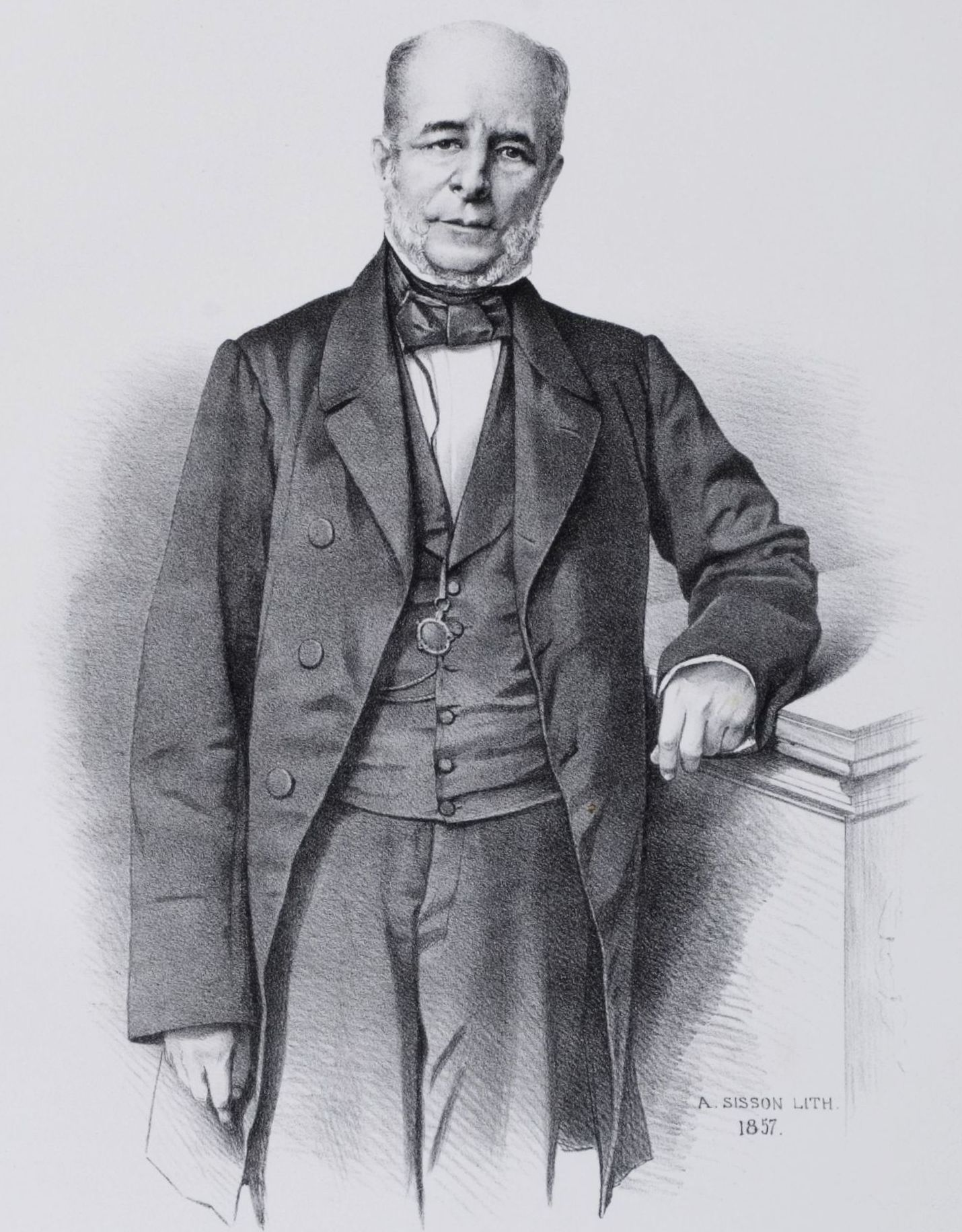

Prime Minister of Brazil
- In office 6 October 1849 – 11 May 1852
- Monarch: Pedro II
- Preceded by: Viscount of Olinda
- Succeeded by: Viscount of Itaboraí

Regent of the Empire of Brazil
- In office 18 June 1831 – 12 October 1835 Serving with Lima e Silva, Bráulio Muniz
- Monarch: Pedro II
- Preceded by: Provisional Triumviral Regency
- Succeeded by: Diogo Antônio Feijó

Personal details
- Born: 7 February 1796 Salvador, Bahia, State of Brazil
- Died: 18 September 1860 (aged 64) São Paulo, São Paulo, Empire of Brazil
- Party: Conservative Party
- Awards: Grand Cross of the Imperial Order of the Cross (1835), Grand Cross of the Legion of Honour (France) (1843)

- Coat of Arms of the Marquis of Monte Alegre

José da Costa Carvalho, Marquis of Monte Alegre, (7 February 1796 – 18 September 1860) was a Brazilian politician, judge, journalist and magistrate. He was a member of the Permanent Triumviral Regency from 1831 to 1835 and Prime Minister of Brazil from October 8, 1849 to May 11, 1852.

== Early life and political career ==
Born in Bahia, Carvalho was the son of José da Costa Carvalho and Inês Maria da Piedade Costa. He studied at the University of Coimbra, becoming a Bachelor of Laws (Law) in 1819. He married, for the first time, the sister of Baron of Itu, Geneva de Barros Leite, in 1824. His wife was widowed by brigadier Luís Antonio and heiress to the greatest wealth in São Paulo at the time. In 1839, three years after the death of Geneva, José da Costa Carvalho married Maria Isabel de Sousa Alvim.

After finishing his studies in Portugal, he returned to Brazil and pursued a career as a magistrate in Salvador, until he was later appointed to the positions of Juiz de Fora and Ouvidor in São Paulo (1821–1822). He served for a year in São Paulo, and then was elected in 1823, deputy for the province of Bahia, to the National Constituent and Legislative Assembly of the Empire of Brazil.

Afterwards, he was elected general deputy for the same province for two consecutive legislatures (1826–1829 and 1830–1833), as he stood out for his talent and oratory. He served as Vice-President of the Assembly from May 4, 1827 to May 5, 1828 and then as President on three occasions: in 1828, then in 1830, each for only two month, and again in 1831, for almost a year.

== Regency ==
After the abdication of Emperor Pedro I in 1831 a provisional regency was established. As it was unable to control the political and social upheaval the country was experiencing, after three months the General Legislative Assembly appointed a Permanent Triune Regency. Senators and Assembly members voted jointly to appoint Francisco de Lima e Silva, João Bráulio Muniz and José da Costa Carvalho as the three regents. José da Costa Carvalho received the second highest number of votes. In 1833 he left Rio de Janeiro and withdrew to his estates in São Paulo. Although this was officially a leave of absence on the grounds of ill health, in fact he never returned to his post.

== Return to politics ==
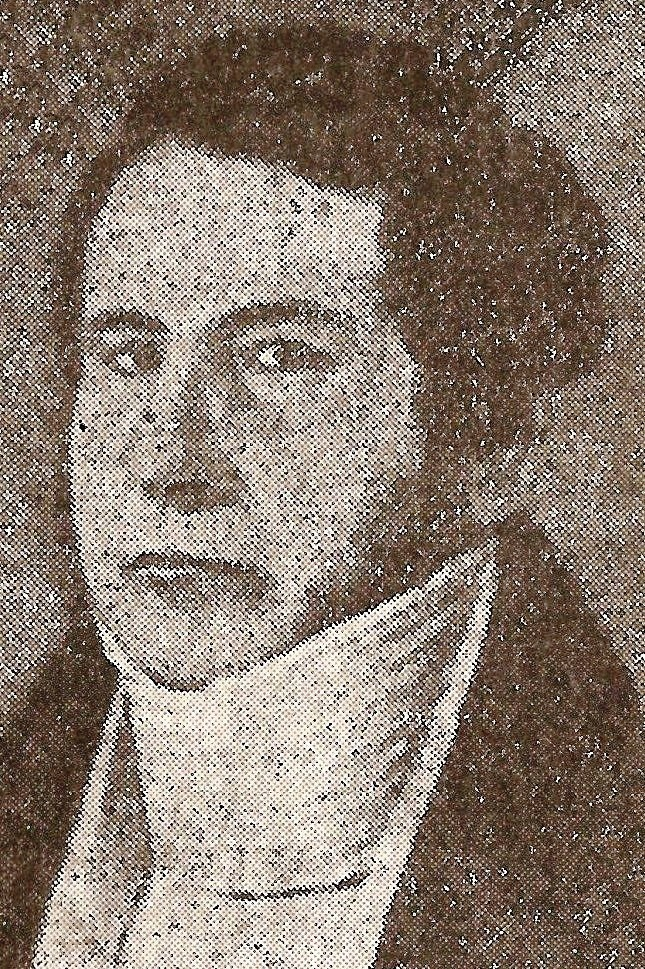
A younger portrait of Costa Carvalho

On the recommendation of the regent Diogo Antônio Feijó, he returned to São Paulo to direct the Largo de São Francisco Law School, from 1835 to 1836. Following the path of the Magistrate, he was also appointed Director of the Faculty of Law of São Paulo (1835–1836). He then decided to return to the political path, becoming general deputy for the province of São Paulo in the fourth Legislature (1838–1841), having taken office on May 19, 1838. However, he resigned to assume the position of senator for life for Sergipe, from 1839 to 1860. He received the title of Councilor of State by imperial decree of July 18, 1841.

A year later, in 1842, he was made governor of São Paulo, in office from January 20 to August 16, 1842, helping to contain the movement of the Liberal Revolt. Once the movement was over, he returned to the Senate, of which he became president from 1842 to 1843.

Minister of the Empire from 1848 to 1852, he replaced the Marquis of Olinda as President of the Council of Ministers (Prime Minister) on 6 October 1849. During his term of office, he carried out the policy of armed intervention by Brazil in the Río de la Plata basin.

== O Farol Paulistano ==
Carvalho founded, ran and edited pt:O Farol Paulistano, the first periodical printed and published in São Paulo, which circulated between 1827 and 1832. It had a standard size of four pages. The first two pages were occupied by news from the province and the city of São Paulo, while the rest was filled with international news, reproductions of articles and notes from the Court, and commentaries. In its Varieties section the newspaper offered moral reflections on democracy, freedom, and the rights of the people.

== Titles and honours ==
He was also president of the Statistical Society of Brazil and the Central Association of Colonization of Rio de Janeiro. He was a member of the Brazilian Historic and Geographic Institute and an honorary member of the Society for the Support of National Industry and of the Imperial Academy of Fine Arts. He was honoured with the title of Baron of Monte Alegre by decree of August 23, 1841, Viscount by decree of September 11, 1843, and finally Marquis, by decree of December 2, 1854.

He died in São Paulo, on September 18, 1860, at the age of 64 and left no heirs. He was buried in the Cemitério da Consolação in São Paulo .
