= José Joaquim Carneiro de Campos, Marquis of Caravelas =

Brazilian politician, lawyer, diplomat and professor

Marquis of Caravelas
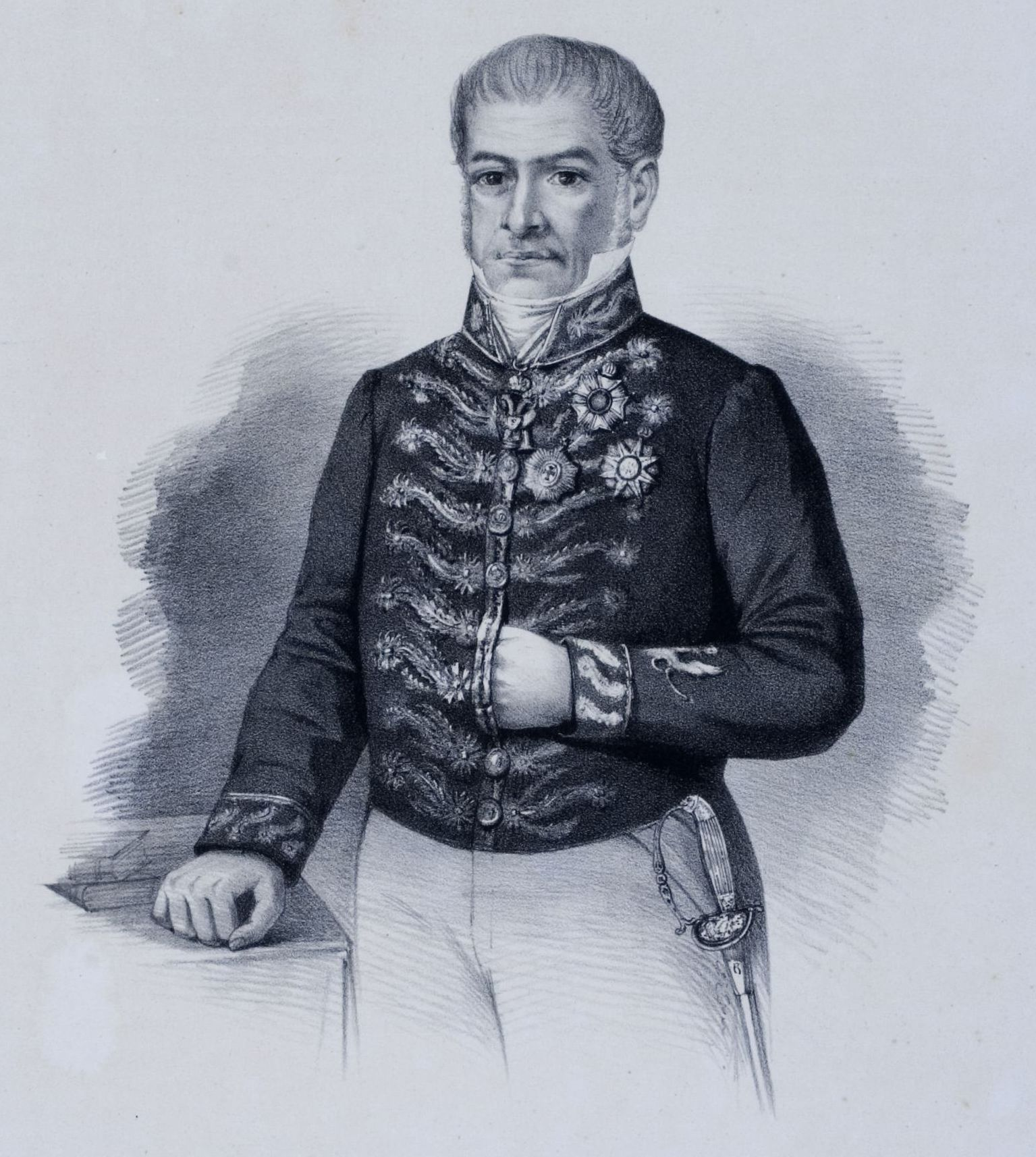

Regent of the Empire of Brazil
- In office 7 April 1831 – 3 May 1831 Serving with Lima e Silva, Campos Vergueiro
- Monarch: Pedro II
- Preceded by: Office established
- Succeeded by: Permanent Triumviral Regency (Portuguese: Regência Trina Permanente)

Personal details
- Born: 4 March 1768 Salvador, Bahia, State of Brazil, Portuguese America
- Died: 8 September 1836 (aged 68) Rio de Janeiro, Neutral Municipality, Empire of Brazil
- Occupation: Politician
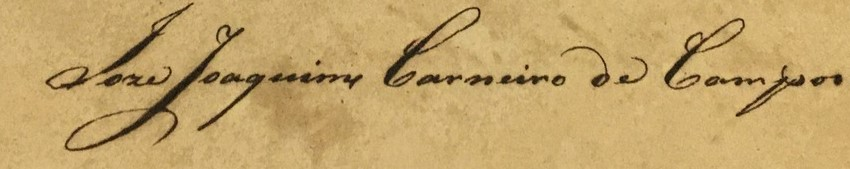
- Signature

José Joaquim Carneiro de Campos, the first Viscount and Marquis of Caravelas (4 March 1768 – 8 September 1836) was a Brazilian politician, lawyer, diplomat and professor.

== Biography ==
The son of José Carneiro de Campos and Custódia Maria do Sacramento, he studied at the São Bento Monastery in Salvador, and studied theology and law at the University of Coimbra. In Lisbon, he held the position of officer of the Secretary of Finance of Portugal.

He was general deputy, minister of justice, minister of foreigners, adviser to the Empire and senator of the Empire of Brazil from 1826 to 1836.

First Viscount with grandeur and then Marquis of Caravelas. He succeeded José Bonifácio de Andrada e Silva in the Ministry of Empire and Foreign Affairs, when Bonifácio resigned from the ministry in 1823.

Carneiro de Campos was one of the drafters of the Imperial Constitution, whose project he signed in 1823. For part of the historiography, he was the main drafter of the project. He opposed the dissolution of the Constituent Assembly, which took place on 11 November 1823, and left the government in protest.

He held several important positions in the Empire, including that of member of the Provisional Triumviral Regency that governed the country from 7 April to 17 June 1831, immediately after the abdication of emperor Pedro I. The other members were Francisco de Lima e Silva and Nicolau Pereira de Campos Vergueiro.
