= Nicolau Pereira de Campos Vergueiro =

Portuguese-born Brazilian coffee farmer and politician

Campos Vergueiro
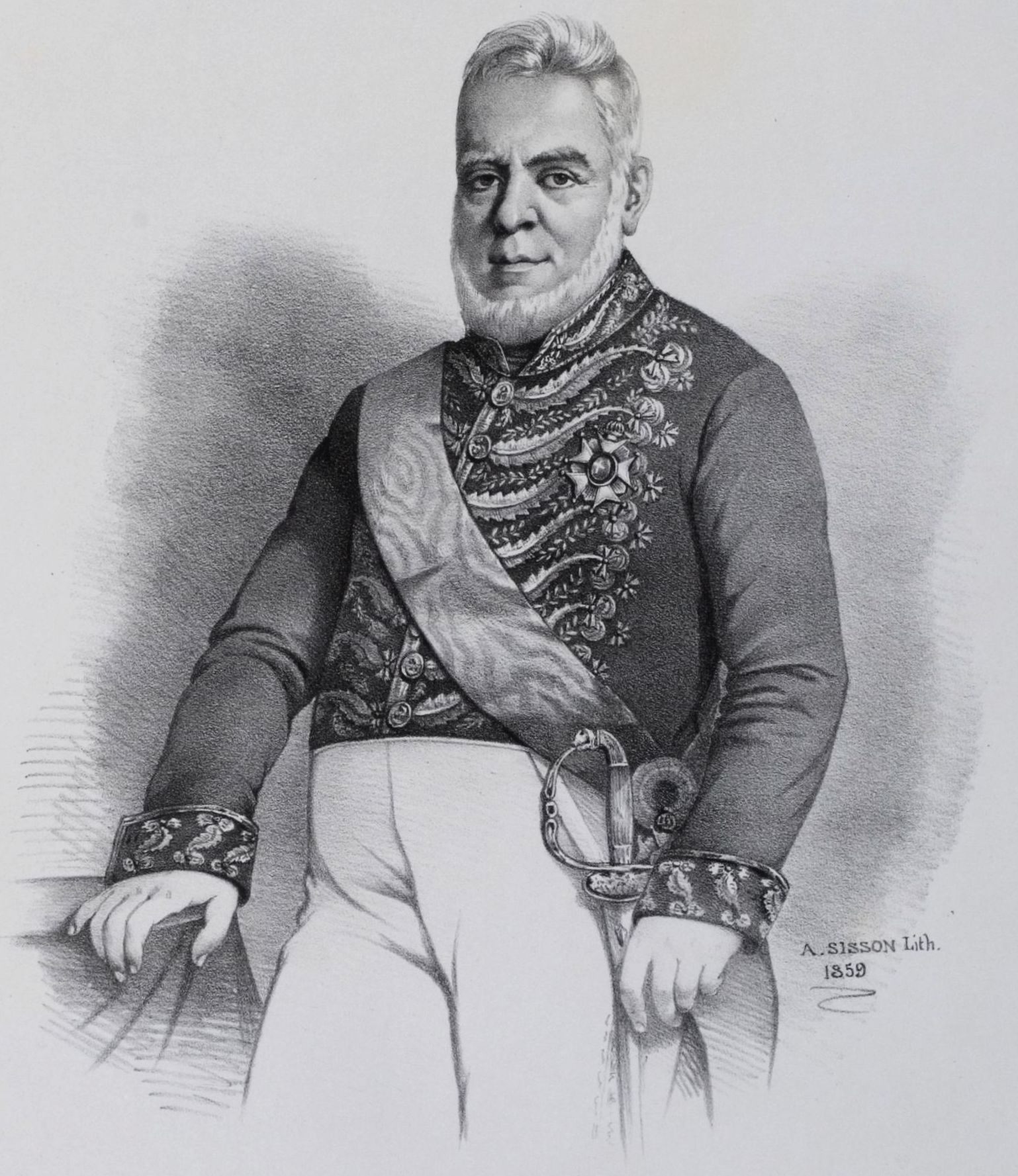

Regent of the Empire of Brazil
- In office 7 April 1831 – 3 May 1831 Serving with Lima e Silva, Carneiro de Campos
- Monarch: Pedro II
- Preceded by: Office established
- Succeeded by: Permanent Triumviral Regency (Portuguese: Regência Trina Permanente)

Minister of Justice
- In office 22 May 1847 – 1 January 1848
- Preceded by: Caetano Maria Lopes Gama
- Succeeded by: Saturnino de Sousa e Oliveira

Personal details
- Born: 20 December 1778 Vale da Porca, Macedo de Cavaleiros, Kingdom of Portugal
- Died: 17 July 1859 (aged 80) Rio de Janeiro, Empire of Brazil
- Spouse: Maria Angélica de Vasconcellos
- Occupation: Politician; landowner

Nicolau Pereira de Campos Vergueiro, better known as Senator Vergueiro (Portuguese: Senador Vergueiro; 20 December 1778 – 17 September 1859), was a Portuguese-born Brazilian coffee farmer and politician and slave trader. He was a pioneer in the implementation of a free workforce, as opposed to slavery, in Brazil by bringing the first European immigrants to work in the Ibicaba farm, which he owned. The contract was prepared by Vergueiro himself, establishing ownership of the production and other measures, mostly of an exploitive nature. Faced with this, the immigrants working in Vergueiro's main property, the Ibicaba farm, revolted under the guidance of Thomas Davatz, a Swiss immigrant and religious leader, who instigated the immigrant workers to grow their ambition to become small or medium-sized landowners, as they imagined they would be when they had left Europe.

== Biography ==
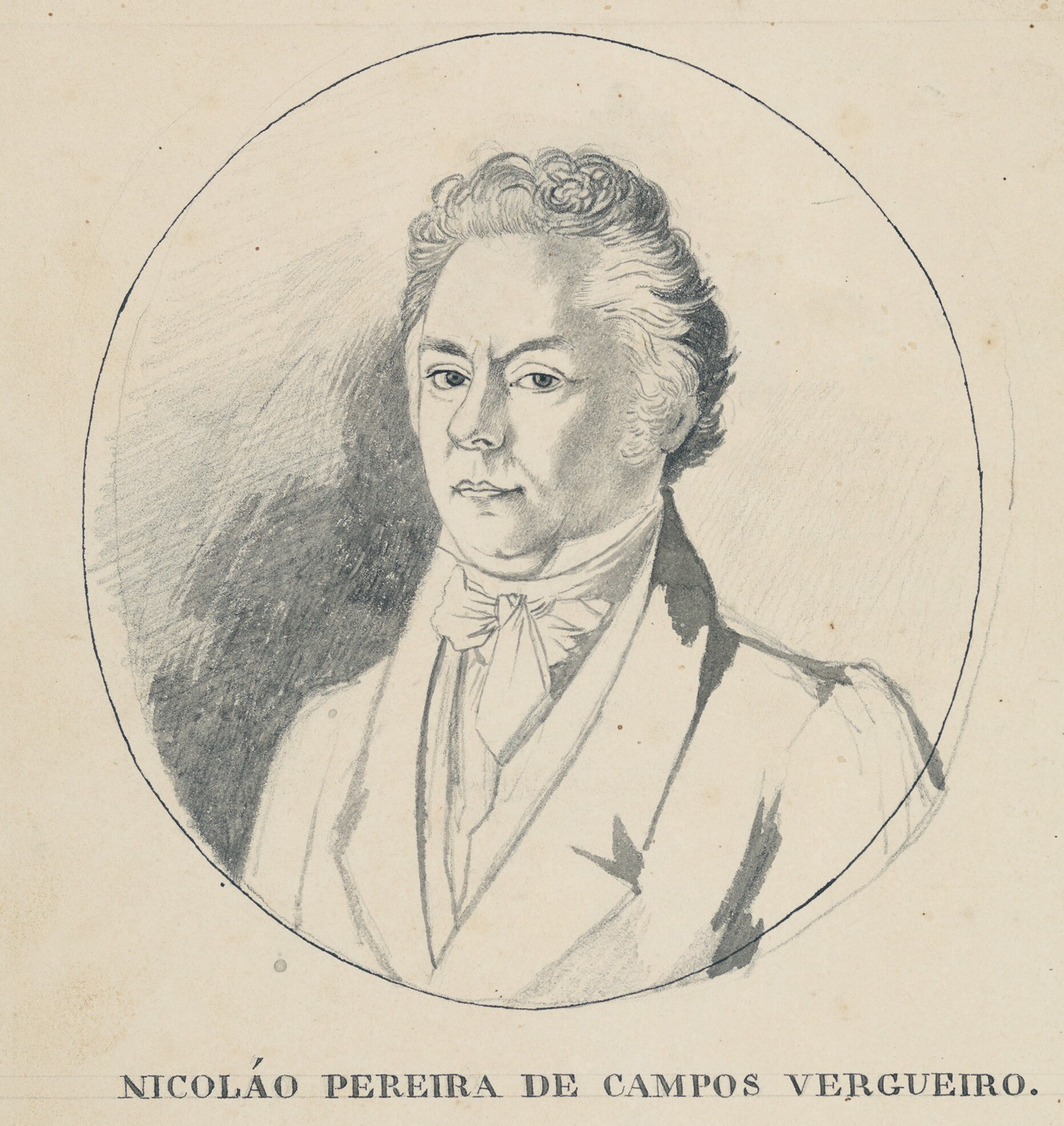
Portrait drawing by Hércules Florence, 1830

Vergueiro was born on 20 December 1778 in Vale da Porca, Portugal, to Luiz Bernardo Pereira Vergueiro and Clara Maria Borges Campos. He graduated with a degree in law from the University of Coimbra in 1801. The young man moved to Brazil in 1803 at the age of 25 and quickly entered the most important political and economic spheres in the province of São Paulo. On 2 August 1804 he married Maria Angelica de Vasconcellos, daughter of captain José de Andrade e Vasconcellos, in the Sé Cathedral. He worked as a lawyer at the São Paulo forum, a position he held until 1815.

In 1807 Vergueiro acquired, in partnership with his father-in-law, a two-league sesmaria – a colonial land grant given under the condition to make the land productive – in Piracicaba, where he founded the Engenho do Limoeiro sugar cane mill, whose first administrator was his brother João Manuel Vergueiro. Seven years later, he acquired a new sesmaria in partnership with his father-in-law. With dimensions of three by one league. Monjolinho, as it was called, was located in Campos de Araraquara and was intended for cattle raising. Some time later, Vergueiro became the sole owner of the two lands.

In 1813 he was appointed councillor of the São Paulo City Council. He was a sesmarias judge until 1816, when he moved to Piracicaba, in partnership with brigadier Luís Antônio de Sousa, he acquired land in the region of Rio Claro. In 1821, on the eve of Brazil's independence, he became a member of the provisional government of the province of São Paulo. He held other positions in the provinces of São Paulo and Minas Gerais. Participating in the 1823 constituent assembly that drafted the first Brazilian constitution as a representative of the province of São Paulo, together with the brothers Antônio Carlos Ribeiro de Andrada, José Bonifácio de Andrada e Silva and Martim Francisco Ribeiro de Andrada, who was arrested after the dissolution of the assembly.

He was a senator for ten consecutive terms and with the abdication of emperor Pedro I on 7 April 1831, he was elected regent for the Provisional Triumviral Regency together with Francisco de Lima e Silva and José Joaquim Carneiro de Campos, as the emperor's heir, the young Pedro II, was only 5 years old and thus could not reign. He integrated the cabinet of 13 September 1832, assuming the office of Minister and Secretary of State of the Empire's Affairs until 23 May 1833 and that of the Treasury until 14 December 1832. He held the Justice ministry in the May 22 cabinet, organized by Manuel Alves Branco, second Viscount of Caravelas and, on an interim basis, that of the Empire.

As a parliamentarian, Vergueiro championed liberal ideals and is recognized today as an early critic of slavery, largely because he helped establish Brazil's first society dedicated to promoting European colonization and "free labour". (Note: In practice "free labour", as opposed to slave labour, amounted to restrictive bonded labour contracts.) However, during the 1830s and 1840s, he amassed much of his wealth through a slave-importing business in the port of Santos. Vergueiro and his sons were among the town's largest slave traders, profiting from various forms of labour. After Brazil, under pressure from Britain, officially banned the transatlantic slave trade in 1830 – a ban that was widely ignored for years and as a result was tightened with the Aberdeen Act of 1845 – Vergueiro anticipated the eventual end of slavery and began advocating for the importation of European migrant workers as an alternative labour source.

In the 1840s and 1850s, he pioneered the introduction of European immigrants – particularly from Germany and Switzerland – to his coffee farms in Limeira and Angélica farm, named after Vergueiro's wife. In 1846, he founded Vergueiro & Companhia Sociedade Civil de Agricultura e Colonização, which was the most important company in Brazil in the sharecropping system. In July 1847, a first experiment with European bonded labour started on the Ibicaba fazenda. Before departing from Europe, immigrants bound for Vergueiro’s lands were required to sign an indenture contract. Once in Brazil, they were subjected to strict oversight. He paid for the immigrants' trip but that meant that they were already in debt when they arrived in Brazil.

This debt peonage system meant that they in practice worked almost for free in the coffee plantations. Their expenses accumulated and could be paid after the harvests, most of the time, however, the immigrants had to take out loans with exaggerated interest rates, generating a cycle of debts. In addition, they were compelled to buy their groceries from the farm's warehouses at high prices. These circumstances soon led to a regime of semi-slavery. Vergueiro, and other fazendeiros, held deeply prejudiced views of these immigrants, believing they had "a lack of ambition, of social experience, of elegance, of body posture, of a sense of opportunity and progress, of boldness, of perceptiveness, of wisdom. In fact, 'colono' means disgusting behavior." The situation became so dire that some immigrants abandoned the plantations without collecting months of unpaid wages—and without settling the debts they owed.

The appalling conditions led to the Ibicaba Revolt, also known as the Partners' Revolt or the Immigrants' Revolt, in 1856, which had international repercussions. The Swiss consul in Rio de Janeiro, who made a three-week onsite visit, that confirmed most of the immigrant complaints, observed that the planters were merely seeking to replace black slaves with white ones. As a consequence, in 1859 the Prussian government adopted the Heydt Edict, prohibiting active recruitment of immigrants, advertising and subsidies for passages. With the failure of the peonage system, farmers began to pay a fixed amount for the immigrant's work, even a monthly salary. Wage labor was introduced in Brazil and African slavery began to deteriorate until it was legally abolished in 1888.

The book entitled Memórias de um colono no Brasil, written by the former Swiss colonist of the Ibicaba Farm, Thomas Davatz, exposed the terrible working conditions of immigrants on coffee plantations. From 1870 onwards, the Brazilian government began to finance the transport and initial accommodation of immigrants. At that time, societies protecting immigration were formed in order to encourage more European immigrants to come to the country.

Vergueiro died on 18 September 1859 in Rio de Janeiro. His body was buried in the São João Batista Cemetery.

== Bibliography ==
- De Souza, Bruno Gabriel Witzel (2019). "The rationale of sharecropping: Immigrant bonded laborers and the transition from slavery in Brazil (1830-1890)" (PDF). IAI Discussion Papers (239). Ibero-America Institute for Economic Research, University of Goettingen.
- Lesser, Jeff (2013). Immigration, ethnicity, and national identity in Brazil, 1808 to the present. New York: Cambridge University Press. ISBN 978-0-521-19362-7.
- Mendes, Felipe Landim Ribeiro (2017). "Ibicaba revisitada outra vez: espaço, escravidão e trabalho livre no oeste paulista". Anais do Museu Paulista: História e Cultura Material. 25: 301–357. doi:10.1590/1982-02672017v25n0112.
- Messeder, José Eduardo C. (1989). "Recursos humanos e transformação social: onde se encontram os desafios?". Revista de Administração Pública (in Portuguese). 23 (4): 49–61. ISSN 1982-3134.
- Read, Ian (2012). The Hierarchies of Slavery in Santos, Brazil, 1822–1888. Stanford, CA: Stanford University Press. ISBN 978-0-8047-7414-7.
