= Pedro de Araújo Lima, Marquis of Olinda =

Brazilian politician (1793–1870)

His Excellency The Marquis of Olinda
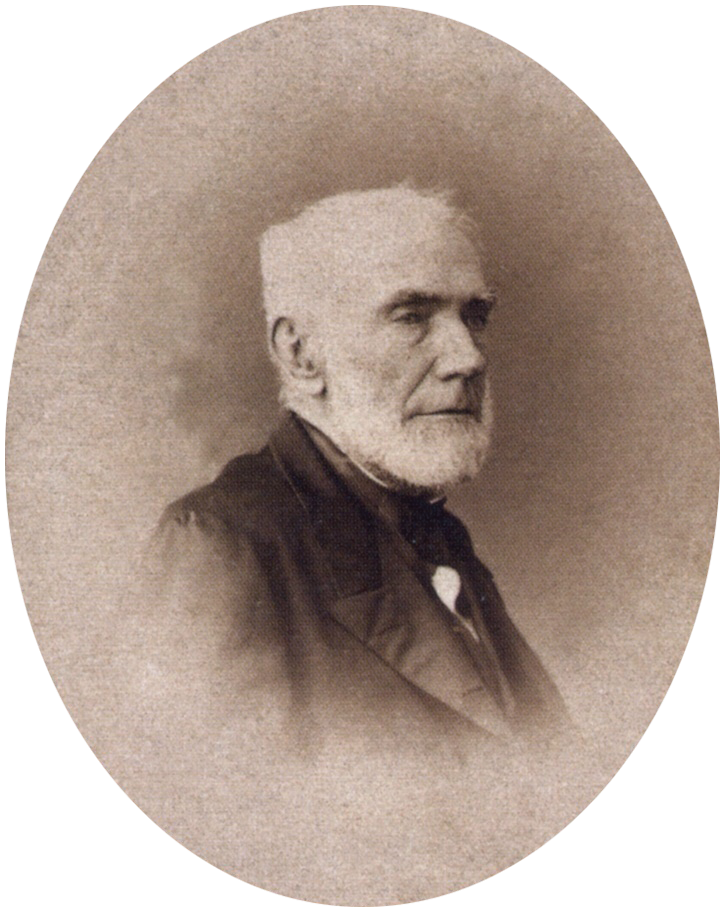
- Pedro de Araújo Lima, Marquis of Olinda around age 67, c. 1860

Prime Minister of Brazil
- In office 12 May 1865 – 3 August 1866
- Monarch: Pedro II
- Preceded by: Francisco José Furtado
- Succeeded by: Zacarias de Góis
- In office 30 May 1862 – 15 January 1864
- Monarch: Pedro II
- Preceded by: Zacarias de Góis
- Succeeded by: Zacarias de Góis
- In office 4 May 1857 – 12 December 1858
- Monarch: Pedro II
- Preceded by: Duke of Caxias
- Succeeded by: Viscount of Abaeté
- In office 29 September 1848 – 8 October 1849
- Monarch: Pedro II
- Preceded by: Sousa e Melo
- Succeeded by: Marquis of Monte Alegre

Regent of the Empire of Brazil
- In office 19 September 1837 – 23 July 1840
- Monarch: Pedro II
- Preceded by: Diogo Feijó
- Succeeded by: Emperor declared of age

Personal details
- Born: 22 December 1793 Antas farm, Pernambuco, State of Brazil, Portuguese America
- Died: 7 June 1870 (aged 76) Rio de Janeiro, Empire of Brazil
- Party: Conservative Party
- Occupation: Politician
- Coat of Arms of the Marquis of Olinda

Pedro de Araújo Lima, Marquis of Olinda (22 December 1793 – 7 June 1870) was a politician and monarchist of the Empire of Brazil. His long political career spanned the reigns of John VI, Pedro I and Pedro II. He was also one of the founders of the Brazilian Conservative Party.

He served as Regent of the Empire of Brazil from 1837 until 1840, during the minority of Emperor Pedro II. Later, during the personal reign of Pedro II, Olinda on four different periods served as President of the Council of Ministers.

== Early life ==
Pedro de Araújo Lima was born on 22 December 1793. His birthplace was Antas farm, near the village of Sirinhaém in Pernambuco (a captaincy of the northeastern region of colonial Brazil). Through his father, Manuel de Araújo Lima, he was a descendant of settlers who had come from Portugal in the early 16th century with Duarte Coelho, the first captain general of Pernambuco. Through his mother, Ana Teixeira Cavalcante, his ancestry traced back to Filippo Cavalcanti, a nobleman from Florence. Filippo Cavalcanti married a daughter of the Portuguese settler Jerônimo de Albuquerque (a brother of Duarte Coelho's wife) and his Amerindian spouse (the daughter of a cacique, or chieftain, of the Tabajara people). His family was both old and wealthy. The family owned several engenhos ("engines"), as sugarcane plantations were called in Brazil. One of these properties was Antas farm. The sugarcane planters were the northeastern equivalent in power and wealth to later coffee farmers in Brazil's southeast.

As there was little access to primary schools, which were usually only to be found in larger towns, Pedro de Araújo Lima learned to read and write at home. In 1805 at the age of 12, he went to live with a paternal uncle in Recife, capital of Pernambuco. He enrolled five years later in the colégio Madre de Deus (Mother of God School). In 1813, he crossed the Atlantic to study Law at the University of Coimbra in Portugal. His fellow Brazilians in Coimbra at that time included Bernardo Pereira de Vasconcelos, Manuel Alves Branco (later the 2nd Viscount of Caravelas), Cândido José de Araújo Viana (later the Marquis of Sapucaí), Miguel Calmon du Pin e Almeida (later the Marquis of Abrantes) and João Bráulio Muniz.

Araújo Lima proved to be a very good student, and he graduated on 15 March 1817. Continuing in advanced studies, he received a doctorate decree in Canon law on 27 August 1819. He returned to Brazil later that year, disembarking in Pernambuco in December. In mid-1820, he was first offered the office of ouvidor (superior judge) and then a position as Provedor da fazenda, dos defuntos, ausentes, capelas e resíduos (Steward of finances, of the deceased, absent, chapels and residuals) in Paracatu, captaincy of Minas Gerais, but he declined both.

Araújo Lima was 1.70 meters (5 ft 7 in) tall, had blue eyes and brown hair.

== Political career ==
In 1820 the military garrisons in Portugal mutinied, leading to what became known as the Liberal Revolution of 1820. The military formed a provisional government and summoned the Cortes—the centuries-old Portuguese parliament, this time democratically elected with the aim of creating a national Constitution.

== Bibliography ==
- Barman, Roderick J. (1988). Brazil: The Forging of a Nation, 1798–1852. Stanford, California: Stanford University Press. ISBN 978-0-8047-1437-2.
- Cascudo, Luís da Câmara (1938). O Marquês de Olinda e seu tempo (1793 – 1870) (in Portuguese). São Paulo: Companhia Editora Nacional.
- Lira, Heitor (1977). História de Dom Pedro II (1825 – 1891): Ascenção (1825 – 1870) (in Portuguese). Vol. 1. Belo Horizonte: Itatiaia.
- Leão Filho, Joaquim de Sousa (1971). "O Marquês de Olinda". Revista do Instituto Histórico e Geográfico Brasileiro (in Portuguese). 291. Rio de Janeiro: Imprensa Nacional.
- Needell, Jeffrey D. (2006). The Party of Order: the Conservatives, the State, and Slavery in the Brazilian Monarchy, 1831–1871. Stanford, California: Stanford University Press. ISBN 978-0-8047-5369-2.
- Porto, José da Costa (1985). O Marquês de Olinda e o seu tempo (in Portuguese). Belo Horizonte: Itatiaia.

Political offices
Preceded by Sousa e Melo	Prime Minister of Brazil; 1848–1849	Succeeded by Marquis of Monte Alegre
Preceded by Duke of Caxias	Prime Minister of Brazil; 1857–1858	Succeeded by Viscount of Abaeté
Preceded by Zacarias de Góis	Prime Minister of Brazil; 1862–1864	Succeeded by Zacarias de Góis
Preceded by Francisco José Furtado	Prime Minister of Brazil; 1865–1866	Succeeded by Zacarias de Góis
Other offices
Preceded by Diogo Feijó	Regent of the Empire of Brazil; 19 September 1837 – 23 July 1840	Most recent
