= Vale da Porca (Macedo de Cavaleiros) =

- Civil parish
- Location in Portugal
- Coordinates: 41.543°N 6.898°W
- Country: Portugal
- Region: Norte
- Intermunic. comm.: Terras de Trás-os-Montes
- District: Bragança
- Municipality: Macedo de Cavaleiros

Area
  - Total: 17.43 km^{2} (6.73 sq mi)

Population (2011)
  - Total: 286
  - Density: 16/km^{2} (42/sq mi)
- Time zone: UTC+00:00 (WET)
  - Summer (DST): UTC+01:00 (WEST)

Vale da Porca is a Portuguese parish located in the municipality of Macedo de Cavaleiros (Bragança District). The population in 2011 was 286, in an area of 17.43 km².
