= João Bráulio Muniz =

Brazilian politician (1796–1835)

- Moniz, c. 1830s

Regent of the Empire of Brazil
- In office 17 June 1831 – 20 September 1835 Serving with Costa Carvalho, Lima e Silva
- Monarch: Pedro II
- Preceded by: Provisional Triumviral Regency
- Succeeded by: Diogo Antônio Feijó

Personal details
- Born: 1796 São Luís, Maranhão, State of Brazil
- Died: 20 September 1835 (aged 38–39) Rio de Janeiro, Empire of Brazil
- Occupation: Politician; writer
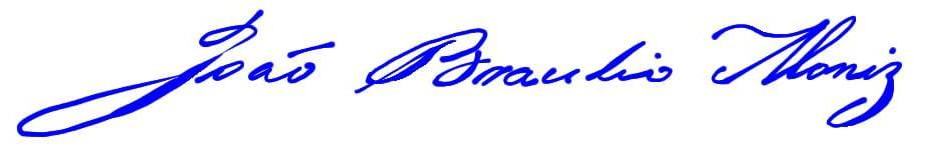
- Signature

João Bráulio Muniz (1796 — 20 September 1835) was a prominent Brazilian politician, military figure, and writer during the 19th century, known for his involvement in the political landscape of Brazil during the reign of Emperor Pedro II. He served as the regent of Brazil in 1835, a position he held during a particularly tumultuous period in the country's history.
