= Francisco de Lima e Silva =

Brazilian military officer and politician

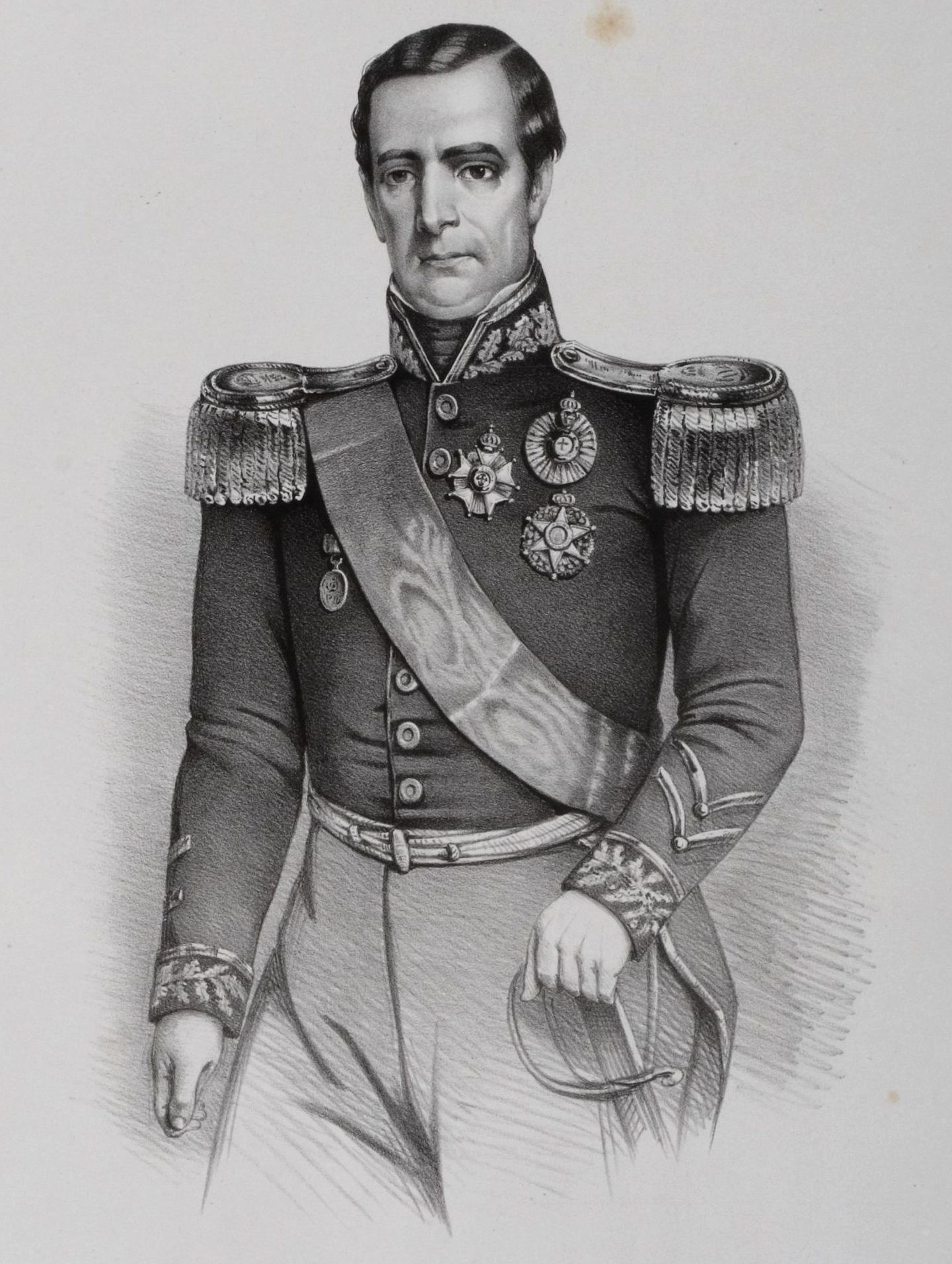

Regent of the Empire of Brazil
- In office 7 April 1831 – 3 May 1831 Serving with Campos Vergueiro, Carneiro de Campos
- Monarch: Pedro II
- Preceded by: Office established
- Succeeded by: Permanent Triumviral Regency (Portuguese: Regência Trina Permanente)
- In office 17 June 1831 – 12 October 1835 Serving with Costa Carvalho, Bráulio Muniz
- Monarch: Pedro II
- Preceded by: Provisional Triumviral Regency (Portuguese: Regência Trina Provisória)
- Succeeded by: Diogo Antônio Feijó

Personal details
- Born: 8 July 1785 Rio de Janeiro, State of Brazil, Portuguese America
- Died: 2 December 1853 (aged 68) Rio de Janeiro, Empire of Brazil
- Spouse: Mariana Cândida de Oliveira Belo
- Children: Luís Alves de Lima e Silva; José Joaquim de Lima e Silva Sobrinho; Carlota Guilhermina de Lima e Silva
- Occupation: Politician; landowner

Military service
- Allegiance: Empire of Brazil
- Branch/service: Imperial Brazilian Army
- Rank: Brigadier
- Battles/wars: Confederation of the Equator

Francisco de Lima e Silva (8 July 1785 – 2 December 1853) was a Brazilian military officer and politician who served twice as regent of the Empire of Brazil during the minority of emperor Pedro II.

== Biography ==
Lima e Silva was the son of field marshal José Joaquim de Lima e Silva, commander of the Order of Aviz, and Joana Maria da Fonseca Costa. Among his brothers were José Joaquim de Lima e Silva, who became the viscount of Majé, Manuel da Fonseca Lima e Silva, who became the baron of Suruí, and João Manuel de Lima e Silva.

Lima e Silva joined the army at the age of five, as was the tradition in his family. He studied in the Royal Academy of Artillery, Fortification and Design, later transferring to the Academy of Arithmetic, Practical Geometry, Fortification, Design and French Language, created for the training of artillery officers. He joined the troops loyal to prince Pedro, who was regent on the occasion of the independence of Brazil.

In 1801 he married Mariana Cândida de Oliveira Belo, with whom he had three children: Luís Alves de Lima e Silva, the future Duke of Caxias, José Joaquim de Lima e Silva Sobrinho, the future Count of Tocantins, and Carlota Guilhermina de Lima e Silva, who married her uncle, Manuel da Fonseca de Lima e Silva, the Baron of Suruí.

In 1824, with the rank of brigadier in the Imperial Army, he commanded a brigade in the suppression of the Confederation of the Equator. He had disagreements with then emperor Pedro I for having tried to negotiate a surrender with the rebels. Once the rebellion was suppressed, Lima e Silva was nominated interim president of the province of Pernambuco and of the military commission that was assembled to carry on the trial of the confederate rebels from 1824 to 1825, being accused of trying to retardate the execution of their sentences. He received no promotions for that campaign.

On 7 April 1831, following the abdication of emperor Pedro I due to the growing popular dissatisfaction with his rule, Lima e Silva was elected regent by General Assembly in the provisional triumviral regency, as the heir to the throne, emperor Pedro II, was still a minor. The other two members of the regency were José Carneiro de Campos, the Marquis of Caravelas, and Nicolau Pereira de Campos Vergueiro.

On 17 June 1831, he was again elected as regent, this time for a permanent triumviral regency, together with João Bráulio Muniz and José da Costa Carvalho.

Lima e Silva was granted the title of baron of Barra Grande by imperial letter on 18 July 1841, which he rejected, although it appears in the archives of the Notary of Nobreza e Fidalguia. The title refers to the town of Barra Grande, on the border between Alagoas and Pernambuco, where imperial troops were concentrated at the time of the Confederation of the Equator. He also received the Grand Cross of the Imperial Order of the Cross.
