= Diogo Feijó =

Regent of the Empire of Brazil (1784–1843)

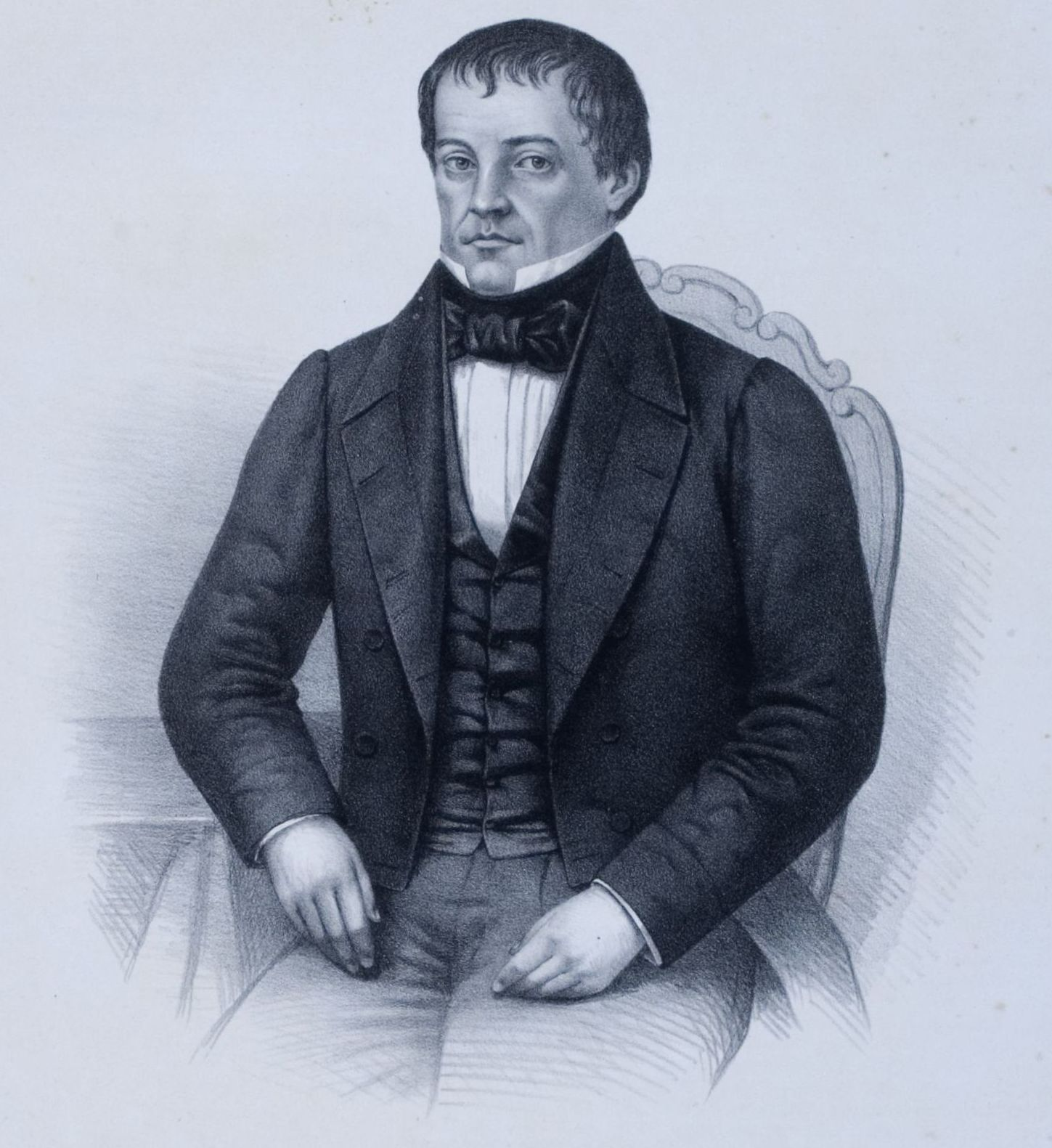

Regent of the Empire of Brazil
- In office 12 October 1835 – 18 September 1837
- Monarch: Pedro II
- Preceded by: Francisco de Lima e Silva; José da Costa Carvalho; João Bráulio Muniz
- Succeeded by: Pedro de Araújo Lima

President of the Imperial Senate
- In office 4 May 1839 – 9 April 1840
- Monarch: Pedro II
- Preceded by: Marquis of Baependi
- Succeeded by: Marquis of Paranaguá

Minister of Justice
- In office 5 July 1831 – 3 August 1832
- Monarch: Pedro II
- Preceded by: Manuel de Sousa França
- Succeeded by: Pedro de Araújo Lima

Personal details
- Born: 10 August 1784 São Paulo, Captaincy of São Paulo, State of Brazil, Portuguese America
- Died: 10 November 1843 (aged 59) São Paulo, São Paulo Province, Empire of Brazil
- Party: Liberal

Diogo Antônio Feijó (10 August 1784 – 10 November 1843) was a Brazilian politician and Catholic priest. He was the regent of the Empire of Brazil from October 1835 to September 1837. Aside from members of the Imperial family, he was the first to ever hold this position alone; the other was his appointed successor after his resignation, the Marquis of Olinda. Both were regents at the time Emperor Pedro II was still a minor.

== Biography ==
Feijó received his early education in a clerical college of São Paulo. In 1807 he was ordained a priest, and soon afterwards began to teach in Santana de Parnaíba.

In 1820 the liberal revolution triumphed in Portugal, and Feijó was sent as a representative of the province of São Paulo to the Portuguese assembly (Portuguese: Cortes) in Lisbon, to which he was admitted on 11 February 1822. On 25 April, he made an eloquent speech in defense of Brazilian rights, which were threatened by the Portuguese majority in the assembly. The Brazilian representatives were unsuccessful in their demands, and Feijó, along with five others, secretly left Lisbon for Falmouth. There, on 22 October 1822, they published the Falmouth Manifesto explaining their conduct. Feijó later returned to Brazil and retired to Itu.

In 1824 Dom Pedro I submitted a proposed constitution to the municipalities of the empire, which was almost unanimously accepted, except at Itu, where Feijó proposed to amend it. The province of São Paulo elected him successively to the legislatures of 1826–29 and 1830–1833. In 1827, Feijó proposed the abolition of clerical celibacy, and in 1828 he submitted a bill for the reform of municipalities.

In 1831 Feijó was appointed minister of justice by the regency, and in this position dissolved undisciplined military bodies, checked on 7 October 1831 the revolution in the Ilha das Cobras, organized on 10 October a body of military police, and in 1832 suppressed another revolt. In 1833 he was appointed senator for life and in 1834 the electors of the empire made him regent of Brazil. On the day before his election as regent, he had been appointed bishop of Mariana, but declined the offer for political reasons.

He took office as regent on 12 October 1835. As regent, he pushed for liberal and progressive reforms, but his policies were met with such fierce opposition from the conservatives that, on 18 September 1837, he resigned his office, retired to São Paulo and did not appear in the Senate again until 1838. He served as the President of the Senate from 1839 to 1840.

In 1842 he edited a political newspaper called O Justiceiro. In the same year the Liberal Revolts broke out near Campinas, where Feijó was living, and, although enfeebled by his age and sickness, he took upon himself the responsibility of the movement, and, after being defeated, was arrested, taken to Santos, and thence to Rio de Janeiro, to be tried by the Senate. He succeeded in explaining his conduct before that body, and this proved to be the last act of his political life, for he died soon afterwards.
