= Prime Minister of Brazil =

Political office in Brazil

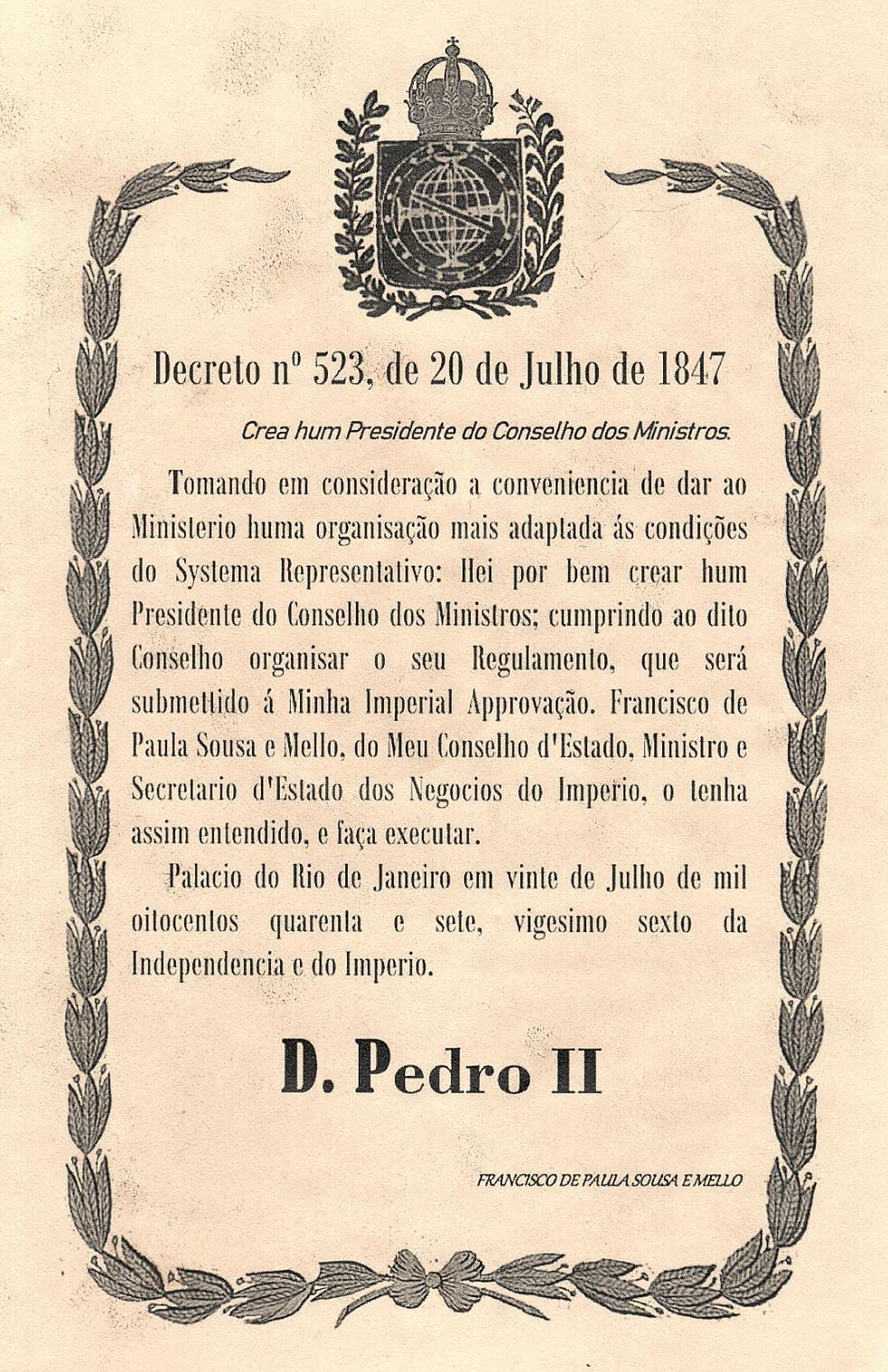
Document establishing the position in 1847

The Prime minister of Brazil, officially called President of the Council of Ministers (Portuguese: Presidente do Conselho de Ministros), was the de facto head of government of Brazil. The post existed separately during two different periods: from 1847 to 1889, during the Empire, and from 1961 to 1963, during the Fourth Republic.

The parliamentary system was first introduced in the country in 1847 by Emperor Pedro II and maintained until the abolition of the monarchy in 1889. The system was briefly restored during the tenure of President João Goulart between 1961 and 1963, after a constitutional amendment approved by his opponents before the beginning of his term created the post; it was abolished with a plebiscite.

== Empire of Brazil (1847–1889) ==
Prime Ministers of the Empire of Brazil
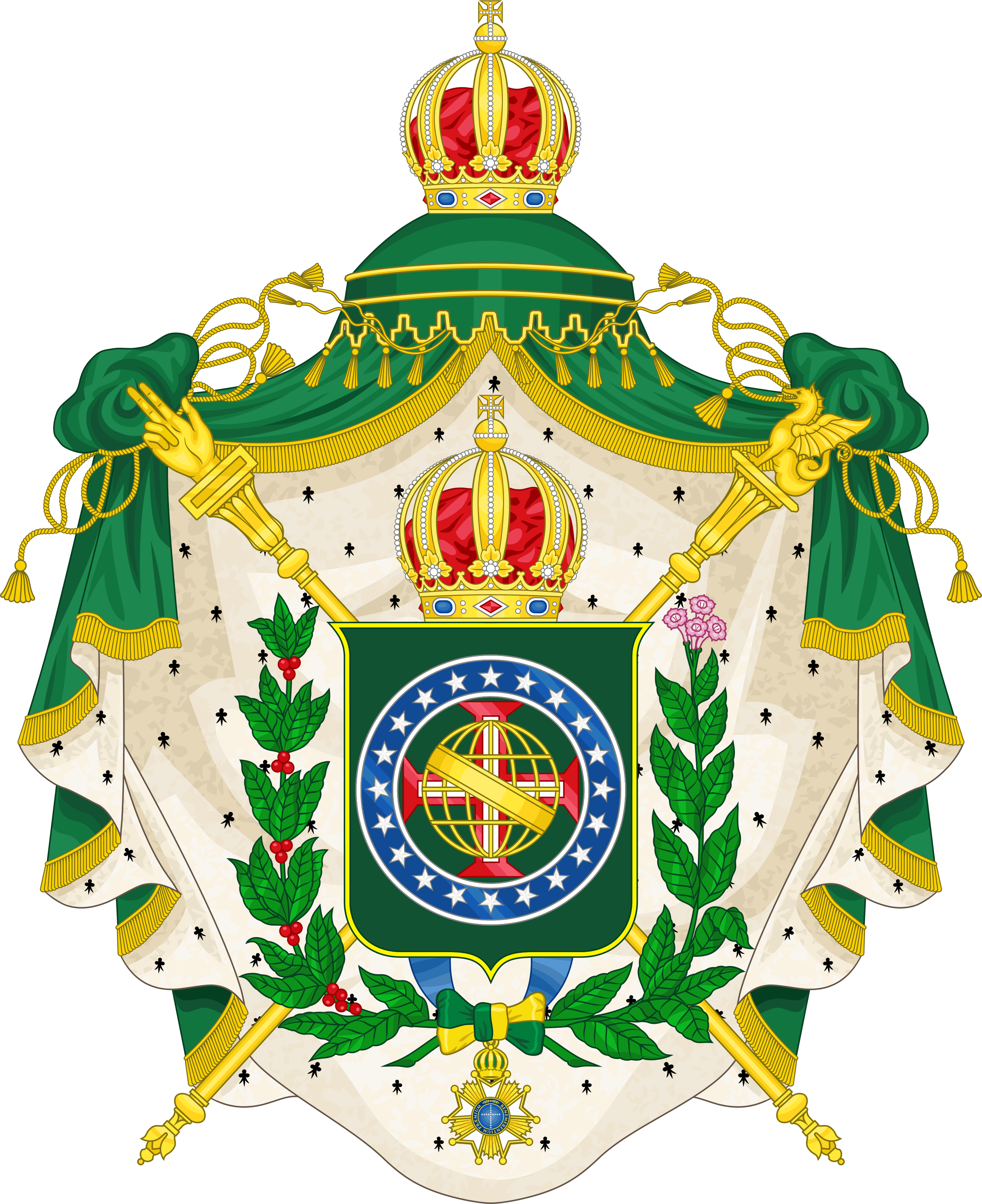
- Grand Imperial Coat of Arms

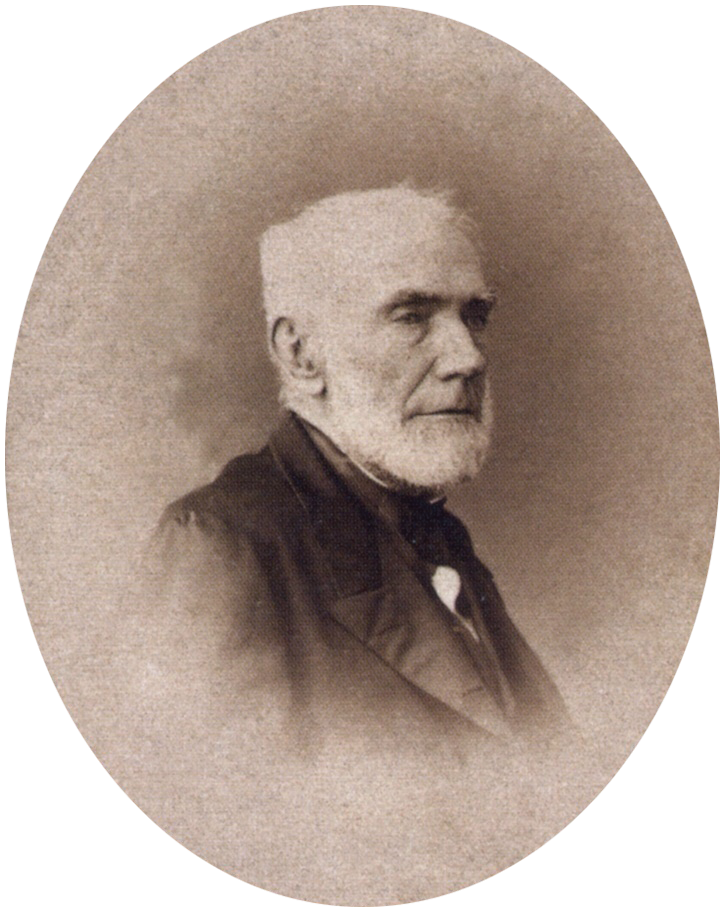
- The Marquis of Olinda, the longest serving officeholder.
- Type: de facto Head of Government
- Reports to: Emperor; Chamber of Deputies
- Residence: Rio de Janeiro, Empire of Brazil
- Seat: Imperial Palace
- Appointer: The Emperor (1847–1889)
- Term length: At His Majesty's pleasure
- Formation: 20 July 1847
- First holder: The 2nd Viscount of Caravelas
- Final holder: The Viscount of Ouro Preto
- Abolished: 15 November 1889

The position of President of the Council of Minister, often referred to by the Brazilian people as President of the Cabinet or President of the Council and rendered in English-speaking countries as Prime Minister, was first created in 1847 by the Brazilian Emperor Pedro II. The 1824 Brazilian Constitution did not require the Emperor to appoint a prime minister, nor did it provide for a parliamentary system of government, instead vesting the Executive authority in the Emperor himself and stipulating that the Emperor was to be aided by ministers that he was free to appoint and dismiss. However, Emperor Pedro II decided to appoint a president among his ministers to lead the workings of the Government. He also chose to create a sort of parliamentary government, whereby the prime minister would be someone who could command a majority in the Chamber of Deputies, the lower House of the Brazilian imperial parliament, known as General Assembly. Therefore, even without being required by the Constitution, the Emperor started to exercise his authority in a manner compatible with parliamentary government, only appointing as prime minister someone who could retain parliamentary support.

However, the emperor was not a figurehead monarch like other Heads of State in a parliamentary system. The prime minister needed to retain the political confidence both of a majority of the General Assembly and of the Emperor, who actively scrutinized the workings of the Government. Sometimes the Emperor would dissolve the Chamber of Deputies and summon new elections (a power he possessed under the Constitution), or dismiss the prime minister, due to his own political beliefs about the efficiency of the Government. Thus, the Emperor would often dismiss a Prime minister and then appoint someone else from the same party. All this led to a succession of short-lived Cabinets. The Emperor retained decision-making powers with regard to the signature or veto of bills passed by Parliament and would not always abide by the advice of his ministers. And that was seen as normal given that the monarch wasn't required by the Constitution to reign in a parliamentary system, and the establishment of one was only a limited and voluntary decision of Pedro II. Therefore, the parliamentary system voluntarily established by Emperor Pedro II wasn't identical to the standard of a parliamentary government with a Head of State that reigns but does not govern, given that the Emperor retained part of the control over the daily affairs of his government. Thus, the parliamentary system that was put in place in the reign of Pedro II can be termed a semi-parliamentary government, and can be compared to the political system of a semi-presidential republic such as France, in which the Head of State has more than just the customary reserve powers, but there is also a prime minister who needs to maintain the confidence of Parliament in order to retain his office. This co-existence of a head of state with real powers and influence with a prime minister responsible before Parliament was dubbed by many Brazilian political scientists as reverse parliamentarism (parlamentarismo às avessas), a criticism corresponding to their view that, in the parliamentary system created by Emperor Pedro II, the Chamber of Deputies was the weaker party, and the survival of the Cabinet depended more on the confidence of the Emperor than in that of Parliament.

Shortcomings in party loyalty, with members of Parliament and groups of members rooting for their own interests and not always abiding by the directives of the party leadership also contributed greatly to short-lived Cabinets. Indeed, it was very common for a prime minister to be replaced due to lack of support from his party's backbenchers, causing the prime minister to be replaced with somebody else from the same party, during the same Parliament.

During the forty-nine years of Pedro II's personal reign, from 1840 until 1889 there were sixteen parliamentary elections (eleven provoked by the dissolution of Parliament by the Emperor at the Prime Minister's request, with the summoning of new elections, and five others provoked by the expiration of the term of office of the members of the Chamber of Deputies). This means that, on average, each legislature of the Chamber of Deputies had a life span slightly superior to three years. However, in the forty-two years between the creation of the office of Prime Minister in 1847 and its abolition in 1889, there were thirty-two appointments to the presidency of the council, which means that prime ministerships lasted on average a little more than a year and four months. Certain politicians, however, like the Duke of Caxias, the Marquis of Olinda, and Zacarias de Góis e Vasconcelos managed to regain the prime ministership after having lost it. Caxias and Zacarias Góis e Vasconcellos each served three times as President of the council, while Olinda held the office of Prime Minister for a record of four times.

The president of the Council owed his position to both his party's majority in the Legislature (and to his party's willingness to support him in the Chamber) and to the Emperor, and these two sources of authority (parliamentary backing and imperial appointment) could sometimes come into conflict. 19th century abolitionist leader and historian Joaquim Nabuco said:

The President of the Council in Brazil was no Russian Chancellor, Sovereign's creature, nor a British Prime Minister, made only by the trust of the Commons: the delegation of the Crown was to him as necessary and important as the delegation of the Chamber, and, to exert with safety his functions, he had to dominate the caprice, the oscillations and ambitions of the Parliament, as well as to preserve always unalterable the favor, the good will of the Emperor."

— Joaquim Nabuco, 1899

The shortest prime-ministership was the first of the three periods of Zacarias Góis e Vasconcellos in office, when he occupied the presidency of the council for just a few days in May 1862 before being replaced. The longest continuous prime-ministership corresponded to the period when the Viscount of Rio Branco was in office: he served as President of the council from March 1871 until June 1875. The Viscount of Rio Branco served as Prime Minister only once, however, and his period of service as prime minister is surpassed by the total duration of the four non-consecutive premierships of the Marquis of Olinda, making Olinda the longest serving President of the Council if non-consecutive time is considered.

The position of prime minister was abolished with the deposition of the Monarchy in 1889.

=== The republic as a coup to remove the prime minister ===
The events of the proclamation of the Republic on 15 November 1889 started as an unprecedented military coup to remove the Liberal Prime Minister Viscount of Ouro Preto, who had been appointed by the Emperor and who enjoyed the confidence of the Chamber of Deputies. Marshal Deodoro da Fonseca, the senior leader and military figure in the plot, was supportive of the Conservative Party and took part in the coup upon invitation by other officers who wanted to overthrow the Liberal Prime Minister. Initially, Deodoro intended to force a Cabinet change, but not to depose Emperor Pedro II. Several of his co-conspirators, however, were republicans, and later in the day the events of the military coup progressed to the abolition of the monarchy. The decision to establish a republican provisional government was taken when Deodoro (who had already proclaimed "Long Live His Majesty the Emperor" during the public acts of the coup) received, from his republican co-conspirator Benjamin Constant Botelho de Magalhães, the false news that the Emperor intended to appoint Gaspar da Silveira Martins, a declared enemy of Deodoro, as the next prime minister.

After the republic was proclaimed, a presidential executive replaced the parliamentary system of government.

== United States of Brazil (1961–1963) ==
President of the Council of Ministers of the United States of Brazil
- Coat of arms of the United States of Brazil (1889–1968)

- Tancredo Neves, the longest serving officeholder in the Republic
- Type: Head of government
- Member of: Council of Ministers
- Seat: Brasília, Brazil
- Appointer: The President of the Republic; with Chamber of Deputies advice and consent
- Constituting instrument: Constitutional Amendment No. 4 of 2 September 1961
- Precursor: President of the Council of Ministers (Imperial Era)
- Formation: 2 September 1961
- First holder: Tancredo Neves
- Final holder: Hermes Lima
- Abolished: 23 January 1963

The military coup that abolished the monarchy and proclaimed the republic in Brazil in 1889 also abolished the parliamentary system and adopted presidentialism. Brazil spent almost 72 uninterrupted years as a presidential republic until September 8, 1961, when the National Congress of Brazil reintroduced parliamentarism amidst a political crisis caused by the threat of coups, the sudden resignation of President Jânio Quadros, and the rise of his vice-president, João Goulart, seen as leaning to the left, to the presidency of the republic; the reintroduction of the parliamentary system was proposed by deputy Raul Pilla a compromise for the acceptance of João Goulart as president, and was carried out through a joint committee of the Chamber of Deputies and the Senate that enacted an amendment to the 1946 constitution on September 2, 1961, entering into force six days later.

The parliamentary system was adopted in 1961 as a compromise solution to a grave political crisis, and was again abolished, this time by plebiscite, in January 1963.

=== Title ===
The official title of the head of the government during that period was Presidente do Conselho de Ministros (President of the Council of Ministers), the same official title possessed by the 19th-century prime ministers of the Brazilian Empire. However, the holders of the office were informally addressed and referred to as Premier or Prime Minister. Often, the expression President of the Council, a simplified version of the official title, was also used.

=== Powers and authority ===
The Additional Act to the 1946 Constitution and complementary federal law established that the Federal Executive Branch would be led by the President of the Republic and the Council of Ministers, with the President of the Council being responsible for political leadership in the Chamber of Deputies.

Due to the short existence and the manner in which the parliamentary system was implemented, most constitutional provisions and federal laws were not adapted to the new institutional arrangement.

==== Advising the President of the Republic ====
All acts of the President of the Republic required the countersignature of the President of the Council and the relevant Minister of State to be valid. Certain other powers assigned to the Head of State, such as command of the Armed Forces and the overall direction of foreign policy, could only be exercised through the President of the Council.

==== Administrative ====
The power to issue decrees and regulations was specifically assigned to the President of the Council, in accordance with federal law. The issuance of such acts covered a wide range of matters, from the exploration and research of mineral resources to the statutes of the University of Brasília.

==== Procedural ====
Although this parliamentary system did not expressly abolish the separation of powers, maintaining the formal independence of each branch, the brazilian model established a regime of collaboration between the Executive and the Legislature. A federal supplementary law detailed how this collaborative arrangement would function between the Council of Ministers and the Chamber of Deputies (with a lesser role for the Federal Senate). In addition to proposals that could only be introduced by the President of the Council, there was a specific procedure for their consideration by the National Congress, involving special commissions in both houses.

=== Appointment ===
The Council of Ministers and its President were to be nominated by the President of the Republic and approved by an absolute majority of the Deputies. The Federal Senate played no part in this procedure but could raise objections. If three nominations for the Council of Ministers were rejected by the Chamber of Deputies, it would fall to the Federal Senate to approve the appointment.

Following approval by the Chamber of Deputies, the President of the Council would recommend the appointment of Ministers of State to the President of the Republic to form the government. The Council of Ministers would have five days to present the government's program to the lower house, which would grant a vote of confidence through an absolute majority. Once the motion of confidence has been voted upon, the Federal Senate could, by a two-thirds vote of its members, object to the composition of the Council of Ministers within forty-eight hours.

In the event of a lack of parliamentary support after this approval, demonstrated by motions of no confidence passed consecutively against three successive Councils, the President of the Republic could dissolve the Chamber of Deputies and call for new elections.

== See also ==
- List of Brazilian monarchs
- List of governors-general of Brazil
- List of presidents of Brazil
- President of Brazil
