= List of senators in Brazil =

This is list of senators in Brazil since its foundation in 1826 until the 52nd (last term of 2003–2007).

== Senators of the Empire of Brazil (1826–1889) ==
After the declaration of Brazilian independence, the new monarch, Pedro I issued a new Constitution in 1824. The Constitution of the Empire made Brazil a monarchy centered on the figure of the emperor and divided into four branches: Executive (the monarch and his ministers), judicial (Judges), moderator (Emperor) and the legislative. Formed by the Senate and House of Representatives.

During the Empire of Brazil (1822—1889), All senators were appointed for life. Besides being for life, the office was unique Brazilian born or naturalized and required a minimum age of forty years and a minimum annual income of eight hundred thousand reis.

Each senator was appointed directly by Emperor, who was presented with a list of three candidates elected in the provinces by a majority vote and indirect. The representatives of the provinces in Imperial Senate were chosen by criteria such as experience in public office and also ennoblement.

The senators were considered "Augustan most worthy and honorable representatives of the Nation" and his office was a sign of important distinction for men dedicated to public life. Nearly all the senators had been general and provincial parliamentarians and more than half of them was a minister of state or governor of the province.

The Senate also included the princes belonging to the line of succession to the Brazilian throne - "the imperial princes Brazil". The princes of the Gran Para and Princes of Brazil - Under Article 46 of Constitution of the Empire of Brazil of 1824 were entitled to a seat in the upper house once they reached the age of twenty-five years. With this option, the Princess Isabel was the first female senator in Brazil - the only case of a royal Brazilian who managed to enjoy such a constitutional arrangement.

Name	Noble title	Province	Legislature				
Name	Noble title	Province	Legislature	Afonso de Albuquerque Maranhão	—	Rio Grande do Norte	1st to 3rd
Afonso Celso	Viscount of Ouro Preto	Minas Gerais	17th to 20th				
Alfredo d'Escragnolle Taunay	Viscount of Taunay	Santa Catarina	20th				
Álvaro Barbalho Uchôa Cavalcanti	—	Pernambuco	14th to 20th				
Ambrósio Leitão da Cunha, Baron of Mamoré	Baron of Mamoré	Amazonas	14th to 20th				
Ângelo Carlos Muniz	—	Maranhão	8th to 11th				
Antônio Augusto Monteiro de Barros	—	Minas Gerais	1st to 4th				
Antônio Cândido da Cruz Machado, Viscount of Serro Frio	Viscount of Serro Frio	Minas Gerais	15th to 20th				
Antônio Carlos Ribeiro de Andrada	—	Pernambuco	6th				
Antônio Coelho de Sá e Albuquerque	—	Pernambuco	12th to 13th				
Antônio da Cunha Vasconcelos	—	Paraíba	3rd to 13th				
Antônio Dias Coelho e Melo, Baron of Estância	Baron of Estância	Sergipe	19th to 20th				
Antônio Dinis de Siqueira e Melo	—	Sergipe	10th to 20th				
Antônio Francisco de Paula de Holanda Cavalcanti de Albuquerque	Viscount of Albuquerque	Pernambuco	4th to 11th				
Antônio Gonçalves Gomide	—	Minas Gerais	1st to 3rd				
Antônio Joaquim Gomes do Amaral	—	Pará	19th to 20th				
Antônio José Machado	—	Ceará	11th				
Antônio Luís Dantas de Barros Leite	—	Alagoas	5th to 14th				
Antônio Luís Pereira da Cunha, Marquis of Inhambupe	Marquis of Inhambupe	Pernambuco	1st to 3rd				
Antônio Marcelino Nunes Gonçalves, Viscount of São Luís do Maranhão	Viscount of São Luís do Maranhão	Maranhão	12th to 20th				
Antônio Paulino Limpo de Abreu, Viscount of Abaeté	Viscount of Abaeté	Minas Gerais	7th to 18th				
Antônio Pedro da Costa Ferreira, Baron of Pindaré	Baron of Pindaré	Maranhão	3rd to 10th				
Antônio Pinto Chichorro da Gama	—	Rio de Janeiro	12th to 20th				
Antônio Rodrigues Fernandes Braga	—	Rio Grande do Sul	14th to 15th				
Antônio da Silva Prado	Baron of Iguape	São Paulo	20th				
Antônio Vieira da Soledade	—	Rio Grande do Sul	1st to 3rd				
Aureliano de Sousa e Oliveira Coutinho	Viscount of Sepetiba	Alagoas	5th to 9th				
Bento Barroso Pereira	—	Pernambuco	1st to 3rd				
Bernardo de Sousa Franco	Viscount of Sousa Franco	Pará	9th to 15th				
Bernardo Pereira de Vasconcelos	—	Minas Gerais	4th to 8th				
Brás Carneiro Nogueira da Costa e Gama	Count of Baependi	Rio de Janeiro	14th to 20th				
Caetano Maria Lopes Gama	Viscount of Maranguape	Rio de Janeiro	4th to 12th				
Caetano Pinto de Miranda Montenegro	Marquis of Vila Real da Praia Grande	Mato Grosso	1st				
Cândido Batista de Oliveira	—	Ceará	7th to 12th				
Cândido Borges Monteiro	Viscount of Itaúna	Rio de Janeiro	10th to 14th				
Cândido José de Araújo Viana	Marquis of Sapucaí	Minas Gerais	4th to 15th				
Cândido Luís Maria de Oliveira	—	Minas Gerais	20th				
Cândido Mendes de Almeida	—	Maranhão	14th to 17th				
Carlos Carneiro de Campos	Viscount of Caravelas	São Paulo	10th to 17th				
Cassiano Esperidião de Melo e Matos	—	Bahia	3rd to 10th				
Clemente Ferreira França	Marquis of Nazaré	Bahia	1st				
Cristiano Benedito Ottoni	—	Espírito Santo	17th to 20th				
Diogo Antônio Feijó	"Regente Feijó" (título não-nobiliárquico)	Rio de Janeiro	2nd to 5th				
Diogo Velho Cavalcanti de Albuquerque	Viscount of Cavalcanti	Rio Grande do Norte	16th to 20th				
Domingos Borges de Barros	Viscount of Pedra Branca	Bahia	2nd to 9th				
Domingos José Nogueira Jaguaribe	Viscount of Jaguaribe	Ceará	14th to 20th				
Estêvão José Carneiro da Cunha	—	Paraíba	1st to 2nd				
Estêvão Ribeiro de Resende	Marquis of Valença	Minas Gerais	1st to 9th				
Eusébio de Queirós Coutinho Matoso Câmara		Rio de Janeiro	9th to 13th				
Evaristo Ferreira da Veiga e Barros		Minas Gerais	20th to 20th				
Fausto Augusto de Aguiar	—	Pará	16th to 20th				
Felisberto Caldeira Brant Pontes de Oliveira Horta	Marquis of Barbacena	Alagoas	1st to 2nd				
Filipe Franco de Sá	—	Maranhão	18th to 20th				
Firmino Rodrigues da Silva	—	Minas Gerais	11th to 17th				
Flávio Clementino da Silva Freire	Baron of Mamanguape	Paraíba	14th to 20th				
Florêncio Carlos Abreu e Silva	—	Rio Grande do Sul	17th				
Francisco Antônio de Sousa Queirós	Baron of Sousa Queirós	São Paulo	7th to 20th				
Francisco de Assis Mascarenhas	Marquis of São João de Palma	São Paulo	1st to 5th				
Francisco Belisário Soares de Sousa	—	Rio de Janeiro	20th				
Francisco Brito Guerra	—	Rio Grande do Norte	3rd to 6th				
Francisco Carneiro de Campos	—	Bahia	1st to 2nd				
Francisco de Carvalho Soares Brandão	—	Pernambuco	18th to 20th				
Francisco Diogo Pereira de Vasconcelos	—	Minas Gerais	10th to 11th				
Francisco Gê Acaiaba de Montezuma	Viscount of Jequitinhonha	Bahia	8th to 14th				
Francisco Gonçalves Martins	Viscount of São Lourenço	Bahia	8th to 14th				
Francisco José Furtado	—	Maranhão	12th to 14th				
Francisco de Lima e Silva	Baron of Barra Grande	Rio de Janeiro	3rd to 9th				
Francisco Maria Gordilho Veloso de Barbuda	Marquis of Jacarepaguá	Goiás	1st to 3rd				
Francisco Otaviano de Almeida Rosa	—	Rio de Janeiro	13th to 20th				
Francisco de Paula de Almeida Albuquerque	—	Pernambuco	4th to 14th				
Francisco de Paula Cavalcanti e Albuquerque	Viscount of Suaçuna	Pernambuco	4th to 17th				
Francisco de Paula Negreiros de Saião Lobato	Viscount of Niterói	Rio de Janeiro	14th to 18th				
Francisco de Paula Pessoa	—	Ceará	7th to 17th				
Francisco de Paula da Silveira Lobo	—	Minas Gerais	14th to 20th				
Francisco de Paula Sousa e Melo	—	São Paulo	2nd to 8th				
Francisco do Rego Barros	Count of Boa-Vista	Pernambuco	8th to 14th				
Francisco do Rego Barros Barreto	—	Pernambuco	14th to 20th				
Francisco de Sales Torres Homem	Viscount of Inhomirim	Rio Grande do Norte	13th to 15th				
Francisco dos Santos Pinto	—	Espírito Santo	1st to 3rd				
Francisco de Sousa Paraíso	—	Bahia	4th to 5th				
Francisco Vilela Barbosa	Marquis of Paranaguá	Rio de Janeiro	1st to 6th				
Francisco Xavier Pais Barreto	—	Pernambuco	12th				
Frederico de Almeida e Albuquerque	—	Paraíba	10th to 17th				
Gaspar da Silveira Martins	—	Rio Grande do Sul	17th to 20th				
Gabriel Mendes dos Santos	—	Minas Gerais	8th to 15th				
Herculano Ferreira Pena	—	Amazonas	9th to 13th				
Honório Hermeto Carneiro Leão	Marquis of Paraná	Minas Gerais	5th to 9th				
Inácio Antônio de Assis Martins	Viscount of Assis Martins	Minas Gerais	18th to 20th				
Isabel de Bragança e Bourbon	Imperial Princess of Brazil	—	14th to 20th				
Jacinto Furtado de Mendonça	—	Minas Gerais	1st to 3rd				
Jacinto Pais de Mendonça	—	Alagoas	14th to 20th				
Jerônimo José Teixeira Júnior	Viscount of Cruzeiro	Rio de Janeiro	15th to 20th				
Jerônimo José Viveiros	—	Maranhão	9th to 10th				
Jerônimo Martiniano Figueira de Melo	—	Ceará	14th to 17th				
Jesuíno Lamego da Costa	Baron of Laguna	Santa Catarina	15th to 20th				
João Alfredo Correia de Oliveira	—	Pernambuco	16th to 20th				
João Antônio de Miranda	—	Mato Grosso	9th to 11th				
João Carlos Augusto de Oyenhausen-Gravenburg	Marquis of Aracati	Ceará	1st to 2nd				
João Ernesto Viriato de Medeiros	—	Ceará	18th to 20th				
João Evangelista de Faria Lobato	—	Minas Gerais	1st to 6th				
João Florentino Meira de Vasconcelos	—	Paraíba	17th to 20th				
João Gomes de Melo	Baron of Maruim	Sergipe	11th to 20th				
João Gomes da Silveira Mendonça	Marquis of Sabará	Minas Gerais	1st				
João Inácio da Cunha	—	Maranhão	1st to 3rd				
João José de Oliveira Junqueira Júnior	—	Bahia	15th to 20th				
João Lins Vieira Cansanção de Sinimbu	Viscount of Sinimbu	Alagoas	10th to 20th				
João Lustosa da Cunha Paranaguá	Marquis of Paranaguá	Piauí	12th to 20th				
João Manuel Pereira da Silva	—	Rio de Janeiro	20th				
João Maurício Wanderley (2º)	Baron of Cotegipe	Bahia	9th to 20th				
João Pedro Dias Vieira	—	Maranhão	11th to 14th				
João Severiano Maciel da Costa	Marquis of Queluz	Paraíba	1st to 2nd				
João da Silva Carrão	—	São Paulo	17th to 20th				
João da Silva Machado	Baron of Antonina	Paraná	9th to 15th				
João Vieira de Carvalho	Marquis of Lajes	Ceará	1st to 6th				
Joaquim Antão Fernandes Leão	—	Minas Gerais	14th to 20th				
Joaquim Delfino Ribeiro da Luz	—	Minas Gerais	14th to 20th				
Joaquim Floriano de Godói	—	São Paulo	15th to 20th				
Joaquim Francisco Viana	—	Piauí	9th to 12th				
Joaquim Jerônimo Fernandes da Cunha	—	Bahia	14th to 20th				
Joaquim José Rodrigues Torres	Viscount of Itaboraí	Rio de Janeiro	5th to 14th				
Joaquim Mariano Franco de Sá	—	Maranhão	7th to 8th				
Joaquim Raimundo de Lamare	Viscount of Lamare	Mato Grosso	18th to 20th				
Joaquim Vieira da Silva e Sousa	—	Maranhão	10th to 12th				
José de Araújo Ribeiro	Viscount of Rio Grande	Rio Grande do Sul	7th to 17th				
José Antônio Correia da Câmara	Viscount of Pelotas	Rio Grande do Sul	17th to 20th				
José Antônio Pimenta Bueno	Marquis of São Vicente	São Paulo	9th to 16th				
José Antônio Saraiva	"Conselheiro Saraiva" (título não-nobiliárquico)	Bahia	14th to 20th				
José Antônio da Silva Maia	—	Goiás	5th to 9th				
José Bento da Cunha Figueiredo	Viscount of Bom Conselho	Pernambuco	14th to 20th				
José Bento Leite Ferreira de Melo	—	Minas Gerais	3rd to 5th				
José Bonifácio de Andrada e Silva (O Moço)	—	São Paulo	17th to 20th				
José Caetano Ferreira de Aguiar	—	Rio de Janeiro	1st to 3rd				
José Caetano da Silva Coutinho	Bispo Capelão-Mór (título eclesiástico)	São Paulo	1st to 2nd				
José Carlos Mayrink da Silva Ferrão	—	Pernambuco	1st to 6th				
José Carlos Pereira de Almeida Torres	Viscount of Macaé	Bahia	5th to 9th				
José Cesário de Miranda Ribeiro	Viscount of Uberaba	São Paulo	5th to 9th				
José Clemente Pereira	—	Pará	8th to 9th				
José Custódio Dias	—	Minas Gerais	3rd to 4th				
José da Costa Carvalho (2º)	Marquis of Monte Alegre	Sergipe	4th to 10th				
José Egídio Álvares de Almeida	Marquis of Santo Amaro	Rio de Janeiro	1st to 2nd				
José Inácio Borges	—	Pernambuco	1st to 4th				
José Ildefonso de Sousa Ramos	Viscount of Jaguari	Minas Gerais	9th to 18th				
José Inácio Silveira da Mota	—	Goiás	9th to 20th				
José Feliciano Fernandes Pinheiro	Viscount of São Leopoldo	São Paulo	1st to 6th				
José Joaquim Carneiro de Campos	Marquis of Caravelas	Bahia	1st to 3rd				
José Joaquim Fernandes Torres	—	Minas Gerais	7th to 14th				
José Joaquim Monteiro da Silva	Baron of Santa Helena	Minas Gerais	20th				
José Joaquim Nabuco de Araújo	Baron of Itapuã	Pará	1st to 4th				
José Maria da Silva Paranhos	Viscount of Rio Branco	Mato Grosso	11th to 17th				
José Martiniano de Alencar	—	Ceará	2nd to 10th				
José Martins da Cruz Jobim	—	Espírito Santo	8th to 17th				
José Manuel da Fonseca	—	São Paulo	9th to 14th				
José Pedro Dias de Carvalho	—	Minas Gerais	10th to 17th				
José Resende Monteiro	Baron of Leopoldina	Minas Gerais	20th				
José Rodrigues Jardim	—	Goiás	3rd to 4th				
José Rodrigues de Lima Duarte	Viscount of Lima Duarte	Minas Gerais	18th to 20th				
José Saturnino da Costa Pereira	—	Mato Grosso	1st to 8th				
José da Silva Lisboa	Viscount of Cairu	Bahia	1st to 3rd				
José da Silva Mafra	—	Santa Catarina	5th to 14th				
José Teixeira da Fonseca Vasconcelos	Viscount of Caeté	Minas Gerais	1st to 4th				
José Teixeira da Mata Bacelar	—	Sergipe	1st to 4th				
José Tomás Nabuco de Araújo	—	Espírito Santo	3rd to 8th				
José Tomás Nabuco de Araújo filho	—	Bahia	10th to 16th				
Lafayette Rodrigues Pereira	"Conselheiro" (título não-nobiliárquico)	Minas Gerais	17th to 20th				
Liberato de Castro Carreira	—	Ceará	18th to 20th				
Lourenço Rodrigues de Andrade	—	Santa Catarina	1st to 5th				
Lucas Antônio Monteiro de Barros	Viscount of Congonhas do Campo	São Paulo	1st to 8th				
Lúcio Soares Teixeira de Gouveia	—	Rio de Janeiro	3rd to 4th				
Luís Alves de Lima e Silva	Duke of Caxias	Rio Grande do Sul	6th to 17th				
Luís Antônio Pereira Franco	Baron of Pereira Franco	Bahia	20th				
Luís Antônio Vieira da Silva	Viscount of Vieira da Silva	Maranhão	14th to 20th				
Luís Carlos da Fonseca	—	Minas Gerais	15th to 20th				
Luís Filipe de Sousa Leão	—	Pernambuco	17th to 20th				
Luís Joaquim Duque Estrada Furtado de Mendonça	—	Bahia	1st to 3rd				
Luís José de Oliveira Mendes	Baron of Monte Santo	Piauí	1st to 8th				
Luís Pedreira do Couto e Ferraz	Viscount of Bom Retiro	Rio de Janeiro	13th to 20th				
Manuel Alves Branco	Viscount of Caravelas	Bahia	3rd to 9th				
Manuel Antônio Galvão	—	Bahia	5th to 8th				
Manuel de Assis Mascarenhas	—	Rio Grande do Norte	8th to 13th				
Manuel Caetano de Almeida e Albuquerque	—	Pernambuco	1st to 5th				
Manuel de Carvalho Pais de Andrade	—	Paraíba	2nd to 9th				
Manuel Felizardo de Sousa e Melo	—	Rio de Janeiro	7th to 12th				
Manuel Ferreira da Câmara Bittencourt Aguiar e Sá	—	Minas Gerais	1st to 3rd				
Manuel Francisco Correia	—	Paraná	16th to 20th				
Manuel Inácio de Andrade Souto Maior Pinto Coelho	Marquis of Itanhaém	Minas Gerais	5th to 13th				
Manuel Inácio Cavalcanti de Lacerda	Baron of Pirapama	Pernambuco	8th to 18th				
Manuel Inácio da Cunha e Meneses	Viscount of Rio Vermelho	Bahia	1st to 8th				
Manuel Inácio de Melo e Sousa	Barão do Pontal	Minas Gerais	3rd to 10th				
Manuel Jacinto Nogueira da Gama	Marquis of Baependi	Minas Gerais	1st to 6th				
Manuel José de Siqueira Mendes	—	Pará	20th				
Manuel José Soares	—	Minas Gerais	20th				
Manuel Luís Osório	Marquis of Herval	Rio Grande do Sul	16th to 17th				
Manuel do Nascimento Castro e Silva	—	Ceará	4th to 6th				
Manuel Pinto de Sousa Dantas	—	Bahia	17th to 20th				
Manuel dos Santos Martins Valasques	—	Bahia	3rd to 11th				
Manuel Teixeira da Costa	—	Minas Gerais	3rd to 11th				
Manuel Teixeira de Sousa	Baron of Camargos	Minas Gerais	10th to 17th				
Manuel Vieira Tosta	Marquis of Muritiba	Bahia	8th to 20th				
Marcos Antônio Monteiro de Barros	—	Minas Gerais	1st to 8th				
Mariano José Pereira da Fonseca	Marquis of Maricá	Rio de Janeiro	1st to 7th				
Martinho Álvares da Silva Campos	—	Minas Gerais	18th to 20th				
Miguel Calmon du Pin e Almeida	Marquis of Abrantes	Ceará	4th to 12th				
Miguel Fernandes Vieira	—	Ceará	11th				
Modestino Gonçalves	—	Minas Gerais	3rd to 11th				
Nicolau Pereira de Campos Vergueiro	—	Minas Gerais	1st to 10th				
Nuno Eugênio Lóssio e Seiblitz	—	Alagoas	1st to 5th				
Patrício José de Almeida e Silva	—	Maranhão	1st to 6th				
Paulino José Soares de Sousa	Viscount of Uruguai	Rio de Janeiro	7th to 12th				
Paulino José Soares de Sousa filho	—	Rio de Janeiro	18th to 20th				
Paulo José de Melo de Azevedo e Brito	—	Rio Grande do Norte	6th to 7th				
Pedro de Araújo Lima	Marquis of Olinda	Pernambuco	3rd to 14th				
Pedro Francisco de Paula Cavalcanti e Albuquerque	Viscount of Camaragibe	Pernambuco	14th to 15th				
Pedro José da Costa Barros	—	Ceará	1st to 4th				
Pedro Leão Veloso	—	Bahia	17th to 20th				
Pedro Rodrigues Fernandes Chaves	Baron of Quaraim	Rio Grande do Sul	9th to 12th				
Rodrigo Augusto da Silva	—	São Paulo	20th				
Saturnino de Sousa e Oliveira Coutinho	—	Rio de Janeiro	6th to 7th				
Sebastião Luís Tinoco da Silva	—	Minas Gerais	1st to 4th				
Tomás José Coelho de Almeida	—	Rio de Janeiro	20th				
Tomás Pompeu de Sousa Brasil	—	Ceará	12th to 16th				
Teófilo Benedito Ottoni	—	Minas Gerais	12th to 14th				
Vicente Alves de Paula Pessoa	—	Ceará	18th to 20th				
Zacarias de Góis e Vasconcelos	—	Bahia	12th to 16th				

== Senators of the República Velha (1889–1930) ==
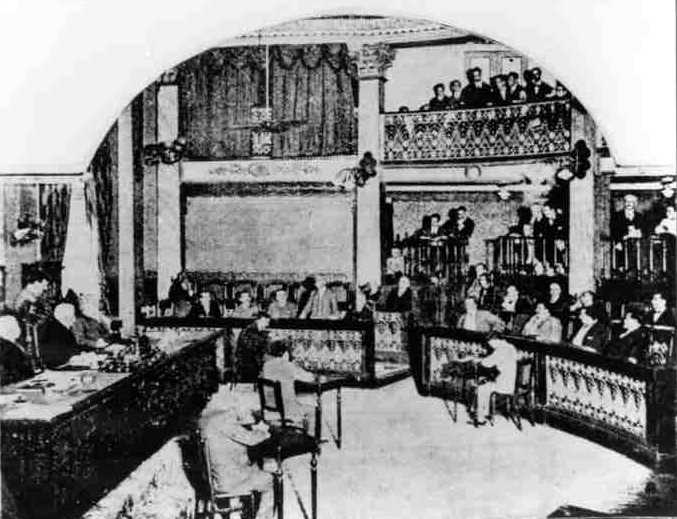
Senator Rui Barbosa addresses the plenary floor in a 1915 session.

The First Brazilian Republic or República Velha (Portuguese pronunciation: [ʁeˈpublikɐ ˈvɛʎɐ], "Old Republic") is the period of Brazilian history from 1889 to 1930. The República Velha ended with the Revolution of 1930 that installed Getúlio Vargas as a dictator.

Name	State	Legislature			
Name	State	Legislature	Abdias da Costa Neves	Piauí	30th to 33rd
Abdon Baptista	Santa Catarina	29th			
Abdon Felinto Milanês	Paraíba	23rd to 25th			
Adolfo Afonso da Silva Gordo	São Paulo	29th to 34th			
Afonso Alves de Camargo	Paraná	32nd to 34th			
Alcindo Guanabara	Distrito Federal	29th to 31st			
Alexandre Cassiano do Nascimento	Rio Grande do Sul	28th to 29th			
Alexandre Colares Moreira Júnior	Maranhão	28th			
Alexandre José Barbosa Lima	Amazonas	32nd to 35th			
Alexandrino Faria de Alencar	Amazonas	27th; 32nd			
Alfredo Ellis	São Paulo	26th to 33rd			
Almino Álvares Afonso	Rio Grande do Norte	23rd to 24th			
Álvaro Augusto da Costa Carvalho	São Paulo	31st to 32nd			
Álvaro de Assis Osório Mendes	Piauí	25th to 26th			
Álvaro Lopes Machado	Paraíba	24th to 29th			
Amaro Bezerra Cavalcanti	Rio Grande do Norte	21st to 23rd			
Américo Lobo Leite Pereira	Minas Gerais	21st to 22nd			
André Gustavo Paulo de Frontin	Distrito Federal	30th to 35th			
Anísio Auto de Abreu	Piauí	27th			
Antonino Freire da Silva	Piauí	31st to 33rd; 35th			
Antônio Alfredo da Gama Melo	Paraíba	26th to 27th			
Antônio Amaro da Silva Canedo	Goiás	21st to 23rd			
Antônio Brício de Araújo	Maranhão	34th to 35th			
Antônio Carlos Ribeiro de Andrada	Minas Gerais	33rd			
Antônio Coelho Rodrigues	Piauí	22nd to 23rd			
Antônio Constantino Néri	Amazonas	25th to 26th			
Antônio da Silva Paranhos	Goiás	21st to 23rd			
Antônio de Lacerda Franco	São Paulo	33rd to 35th			
Antônio Emiliano de Sousa Castro	Pará	33rd to 35th			
Antônio Ferrão Muniz de Aragão	Bahia	32nd to 35th			
Antônio Francisco Azeredo	Mato Grosso	24th to 35th			
Antônio Gonçalves Chaves	Minas Gerais	23rd to 25th			
Antônio Gonçalves Chaves Júnior	Minas Gerais	23rd to 25th			
Antônio Gonçalves Ferreira	Pernambuco	24th to 29th			
Antônio Gonçalves Pereira de Sá Peixoto	Amazonas	26th to 27th			
Antônio José Caiado	Goiás	23rd to 24th			
Antônio José de Melo e Sousa	Rio Grande do Norte	27th to 31st			
Antônio Justiniano Esteves Júnior	Santa Catarina	21st to 25th			
Antônio Luís von Hoonholtz	Amazonas	29th to 30th			
Antônio Massa	Paraíba	31st to 35th			
Antônio Muniz Sodré de Aragão	Bahia	31st to 34th			
Antônio Nicolau Monteiro Baena	Pará	21st to 24th			
Antônio Pereira da Silva Oliveira	Santa Catarina	33rd to 34th			
Antônio Pinheiro Guedes	Mato Grosso	21st to 22nd			
Aquelino Leite do Amaral Coutinho	Mato Grosso	21st to 24th			
Aristides da Silveira Lobo	Distrito Federal	22nd to 23rd			
Aristides Rocha	Amazonas	33rd to 35th			
Arnolfo Rodrigues de Azevedo	São Paulo	34th to 35th			
Artur César Rios	Bahia	24th to 27th			
Artur Bernardes	Minas Gerais	34th to 35th			
Artur de Sousa Lemos	Pará	28th to 30th			
Artur Ferreira de Abreu	Paraná	23rd to 24th			
Artur Índio do Brasil e Silva	Pará	27th to 33rd			
Augusto César Lopes Gonçalves	Amazonas	30th to 35th			
Augusto de Vasconcelos	Distrito Federal	27th to 30th			
Augusto Olímpio Gomes de Castro	Maranhão	23rd to 28th			
Augusto Tavares de Lira	Rio Grande do Norte	28th to 29th			
Benjamin Liberato Barroso	Ceará	31st to 34th			
Bernardino de Sousa Monteiro	Espírito Santo	28th to 35th			
Bernardino José de Campos Júnior	São Paulo	23rd; 25th			
Bernardo Antônio Mendonça Sobrinho	Alagoas	24th to 26th			
Bernardo Pinto Monteiro	Minas Gerais	28th to 32nd			
Brás Benjamin da Silva Abrantes	Goiás	27th to 29th			
Brás Carneiro Nogueira da Gama	Rio de Janeiro	21st to 22nd			
Brasil Ramos Caiado	Goiás	32nd to 35th			
Brasílio Ferreira da Luz	Paraná	25th to 27th			
Caetano Munhoz da Rocha	Paraná	34th to 35th			
Cândido Barata Ribeiro	Distrito Federal	25th to 28th			
Cândido Ferreira de Abreu	Paraná	27th to 29th			
Carlos Cavalcanti de Alburquerque	Paraná	32nd to 35th			
Carlos Frederico Castrioto	Rio de Janeiro	23rd			
Carlos Vaz de Melo	Minas Gerais	26th			
Cassiano Cândido Tavares Bastos	Alagoas	21st to 22nd			
Celso Bayma	Santa Catarina	34th to 35th			
Cleto Nunes Pereira	Espírito Santo	24th to 27th			
Cristiano Benedito Ottoni	Minas Gerais	22nd to 23rd			
Delfim Moreira da Costa Ribeiro	Minas Gerais	31st			
Dionísio Ausier Bentes	Pará	33rd to 35th			
Domingos Vicente Gonçalves de Sousa	Espírito Santo	21st to 25th; 29th to 30th			
Eduardo de Andrade Pinto	Rio de Janeiro	21st to 22nd			
Eduardo Wandenkolk	Distrito Federal	21st to 25th			
Eliseu de Sousa Martins	Piauí	21st to 23rd			
Elói Castriciano de Sousa	Rio Grande do Norte	29th to 34th			
Emídio Dantas Barreto	Pernambuco	30th to 31st			
Epitácio Lindolfo da Silva Pessoa	Paraíba	29th to 31st; 33rd to 35th			
Érico Marinho da Gama Coelho	Rio de Janeiro	27th to 31st			
Euclides Vieira Malta	Alagoas	26th to 27th			
Eugênio Pires do Amorim	Espírito Santo	23rd to 24th			
Eugênio Rodrigues Jardim	Goiás	33rd			
Eurico de Freitas Vale	Pará	33rd to 35th			
Eurípedes Clementino de Aguiar	Piauí	33rd to 35th			
Eusébio Francisco de Andrade	Alagoas	31st to 34th			
Feliciano Augusto de Oliveira Pena	Minas Gerais	24th to 29th			
Feliciano Pires de Abreu Sodré	Rio de Janeiro	34th to 35th			
Fernando Lobo Leite Pereira	Minas Gerais	23rd to 24th			
Fernando Mendes de Almeida	Maranhão	28th to 32nd			
Filipe Schmidt	Santa Catarina	26th to 29th; 31st to 35th			
Firmino Gomes da Silveira	Paraíba	21st to 23rd			
Firmino Paim Filho	Rio Grande do Sul	35th			
Firmino Pires Ferreira	Piauí	23rd to 32nd; 34th to 35th			
Firmo José da Costa Braga	Pará	31st to 32nd			
Florentino Ávidos	Espírito Santo	34th to 35th			
Floriano Vieira Peixoto	Alagoas	21st			
Francisco Álvaro Bueno de Paiva	Minas Gerais	28th to 34th			
Francisco Antônio de Sales	Minas Gerais	27th to 28th; 30th to 32nd			
Francisco da Cunha Machado	Maranhão	32nd to 35th			
Francisco de Assis Rosa e Silva	Pernambuco	23rd to 24th; 26th to 29th; 33rd to 34th			
Francisco de Paula Leite e Oiticica	Alagoas	23rd to 25th			
Rodrigues Alves	São Paulo	22nd to 26th; 30th to 31st			
Francisco de Sales Meira e Sá	Rio Grande do Norte	27th to 28th			
Francisco Glicério Cerqueira Leite	São Paulo	25th to 30th			
Francisco Gomes da Rocha Fagundes	Rio Grande do Norte	25th			
Francisco Leopoldo Rodrigues Jardim	Goiás	25th to 26th; 28th			
Francisco Manuel da Cunha Júnior	Maranhão	21st to 23rd			
Francisco Mendes de Almeida	Maranhão	28th to 32nd			
Francisco Portela	Rio de Janeiro	29th			
Francisco Rangel Pestana	São Paulo	21st to 22nd			
Francisco Rangel Pestana	Rio de Janeiro	25th to 26th			
Francisco Sá	Ceará	27th to 29th; 32nd to 35th			
Francisco Xavier da Silva	Paraná	30th to 31st			
Frederico Guilherme de Sousa Serrano	Pernambuco	21st to 22nd			
Gabriel Salgado dos Santos	Amazonas	28th to 30th			
Gaspar Vasconcelos Meneses de Drummond Filho	Pernambuco	22nd to 23rd			
Generoso Marques dos Santos	Paraná	21st to 22nd; 28th to 33rd			
Generoso Pais Leme de Sousa Ponce	Mato Grosso	23rd to 25th			
Gervásio de Brito Passos	Piauí	27th to 29th			
Gil Dinis Goulart	Espírito Santo	21st to 24th			
Gilberto de Lima Azevedo Sousa Ferreira Amado de Faria	Sergipe	34th to 35th			
Godofredo Mendes Viana	Maranhão	32nd to 35th			
Gonçalo de Faro Rollemberg	Sergipe	31st to 33rd			
Guilherme de Sousa Campos	Sergipe	28th to 30th			
Gustavo Richard	Santa Catarina	23rd to 27th			
Henrique Augusto de Oliveira Dinis	Minas Gerais	34th to 35th			
Henrique da Silva Coutinho	Espírito Santo	24th to 26th			
Hercílio Pedro da Luz	Santa Catarina	25th to 32nd			
Herculano Bandeira de Melo	Pernambuco	25th to 27th			
Hermenegildo Lopes de Morais	Goiás	31st to 34th			
Ifigênio Ferreira de Sales	Amazonas	35th			
Irineu de Melo Machado	Distrito Federal	30th to 35th			
Jerônimo de Sousa Monteiro	Espírito Santo	31st to 34th			
João Baptista Accioli Júnior	Alagoas	34th			
João Baptista Laper	Rio de Janeiro	21st to 23rd			
João Barbalho Uchoa Cavalcanti	Pernambuco	22nd to 23rd			
João Coelho Gonçalves Lisboa	Paraíba	26th to 28th			
João Cordeiro	Ceará	22nd to 26th			
João da Silva Rego Melo	Alagoas	23rd to 25th			
João de Lira Tavares	Rio Grande do Norte	29th to 35th			
João Francisco de Paula e Sousa	São Paulo	23rd to 25th			
João Luís Alves	Espírito Santo	28th to 31st			
João Mangabeira	Bahia	35th			
João Pedro Belfort Vieira	Maranhão	21st to 24th			
João Pereira de Castro Pinto	Paraíba	27th to 29th			
João Pinheiro da Silva	Minas Gerais	26th to 27th			
João Ribeiro de Brito	Pernambuco	29th to 32nd			
João Severiano da Fonseca	Distrito Federal	21st to 22nd			
João Soares Neiva	Paraíba	21st to 24th			
João Tomé de Sabóia e Silva	Ceará	32nd to 35th			
João Vespúcio de Abreu e Silva	Rio Grande do Sul	33rd to 35th			
Joaquim Antônio da Cruz	Piauí	22nd to 25th			
Joaquim Augusto de Assunção	Rio Grande do Sul	29th to 30th			
Joaquim Correia de Araújo	Pernambuco	23rd; 25th			
Joaquim Catunda	Ceará	21st to 27th			
Joaquim Duarte Murtinho	Mato Grosso	21st to 23rd; 26th to 28th			
Joaquim Felício dos Santos	Minas Gerais	21st to 23rd			
Joaquim Ferreira Chaves	Rio Grande do Norte	25th to 29th; 31st to 35th			
Joaquim Francisco Moreira	Rio de Janeiro	33rd to 34th			
Joaquim José Pais da Silva Sarmento	Amazonas	21st to 26th			
Joaquim Leovigildo de Sousa Coelho	Amazonas	21st to 22nd			
Joaquim Lopes Chaves	São Paulo	26th to 28th			
Joaquim Nogueira Paranaguá	Piauí	24th to 27th			
Joaquim Paulo Vieira Malta	Alagoas	26th to 29th			
Joaquim Resende Correia de Lacerda	Paraná	24th			
Joaquim Ribeiro Gonçalves	Piauí	28th to 32nd			
Joaquim Saldanha Marinho	Distrito Federal	21st to 23rd			
Joaquim Teixeira de Mesquita	Espírito Santo	34th to 35th			
Jônatas de Freitas Pedrosa	Amazonas	24th to 29th			
Jorge de Morais	Amazonas	28th			
José Antônio Flores da Cunha	Rio Grande do Sul	35th			
José Antônio Murtinho	Mato Grosso	29th to 35th			
José Antônio Saraiva	Bahia	21st to 22nd			
José Augusto Bezerra de Medeiros	Rio Grande do Norte	34th to 35th			
José Bernardo de Medeiros	Rio Grande do Norte	21st to 27th			
José Cesário de Faria Alvim	Minas Gerais	21st; 24th			
José Cesário de Miranda Monteiro de Barros	Espírito Santo	22nd to 23rd			
José da Costa Azevedo	Amazonas	23rd to 24th; 26th			
José de Almeida Barreto	Paraíba	21st to 26th			
José de Melo Carvalho Muniz Freire	Espírito Santo	26th to 29th			
José Eusébio de Carvalho Oliveira	Maranhão	28th to 33rd			
José Félix Alves Pacheco	Piauí	29th to 32nd			
José Fernandes de Barros Lima	Alagoas	33rd to 35th			
José Freire Bezerril Fontenelle	Ceará	24th to 26th; 28th			
José Gaudêncio Correia de Queirós	Paraíba	35th			
José Gomes Pinheiro Machado	Rio Grande do Sul	21st to 30th			
José Henrique Carneiro da Cunha	Pernambuco	32nd to 34th			
José Higino Duarte Pereira	Pernambuco	21st to 22nd			
José Joaquim de Almeida Pernambuco	Pernambuco	22nd to 25th			
José Joaquim de Sousa	Goiás	21st to 28th			
José Joaquim Domingues Carneiro	Ceará	28th			
José Joaquim Pereira Lobo	Sergipe	29th to 35th			
José Joaquim Seabra	Bahia	30th to 31st			
José Leopoldo Bulhões Jardim	Goiás	23rd to 25th; 28th to 31st			
José Lopes da Silva Trovão	Distrito Federal	23rd to 25th			
José Luís Coelho e Campos	Sergipe	21st to 29th			
José Marcelino da Rosa e Silva	Pernambuco	24th to 26th			
José Marcelino de Sousa	Bahia	28th to 30th			
José Maria de Albuquerque Belo	Pernambuco	35th			
José Maria Magalhães de Almeida	Maranhão	33rd			
José Maria Metello	Mato Grosso	25th to 30th			
José Maria Metello Júnior	Distrito Federal	31st to 32nd			
José Matoso de Sampaio Correia	Distrito Federal	32nd to 34th			
José Mendes Tavares	Distrito Federal	33rd to 35th			
José Pais de Carvalho	Pará	21st to 22nd; 26th to 29th			
José Pedro de Oliveira Galvão	Rio Grande do Norte	21st to 23rd			
José Pereira dos Santos Andrade	Paraná	21st to 23rd			
José Pires Rebelo	Piauí	32nd to 35th			
José Pompeu Pinto Accioli	Ceará	32nd to 33rd			
José Rufino Bezerra Cavalcante	Pernambuco	31st			
José Secondino Lopes de Gomensoro	Maranhão	22nd to 23rd			
José Simeão de Oliveira	Pernambuco	21st to 22nd			
José Siqueira Meneses	Sergipe	29th to 32nd			
José Tomás da Porciúncula	Rio de Janeiro	24th to 25th			
Júlio Anacleto Falcão da Frota	Rio Grande do Sul	21st to 28th			
Júlio Bueno Brandão	Minas Gerais	24th to 27th; 33rd to 35th			
Júlio Veríssimo da Silva Santos	Rio de Janeiro	35th			
Justo Pereira Leite Chermont	Pará	23rd to 28th; 32nd to 33rd			
Juvenal Lamartine de Faria	Rio Grande do Norte	34th			
Lauro Nina Sodré e Silva	Pará	24th to 25th; 29th to 30th; 32nd to 35th			
Lauro Nina Sodré e Silva	Distrito Federal	26th to 29th			
Lauro Müller	Santa Catarina	25th; 27th to 28th; 30th to 33rd			
Leandro Ribeiro de Siqueira Maciel	Sergipe	23rd to 26th			
Lourenço Maria de Almeida Baptista	Rio de Janeiro	26th to 32nd			
Luís Adolfo Correia da Costa	Mato Grosso	32nd to 33rd			
Luís Correia de Brito	Pernambuco	34th to 35th			
Luís de Albuquerque Maranhão	Paraná	34th			
Luís Delfino dos Santos	Santa Catarina	21st to 22nd			
Luís Gonzaga Jaime	Goiás	28th to 32nd			
Luís Siqueira da Silva Lima	Espírito Santo	25th to 28th			
Luís Soares dos Santos	Rio Grande do Sul	30th to 34th			
Luís Viana	Bahia	22nd to 23rd; 29th to 31st			
Luís Vieira Siqueira Torres	Alagoas	33rd			
Macário das Chagas Rocha Lessa	Alagoas	26th to 27th			
Manuel Antônio Pereira Borba	Pernambuco	31st to 34th			
Manuel Bernardino da Costa Rodrigues	Maranhão	29th to 35th			
Manuel Bezerra de Albuquerque Júnior	Ceará	21st to 22nd			
Manuel Clementino do Monte	Alagoas	35th			
Manuel da Silva Rosa Júnior	Sergipe	21st to 25th			
Manuel de Alencar Guimarães	Paraná	27th to 31st			
Manuel de Matos Duarte Silva	Rio de Janeiro	34th			
Manuel de Melo Cardoso Barata	Pará	21st to 27th			
Manuel de Morais e Barros	São Paulo	23rd to 25th			
Manuel de Queirós Matoso Ribeiro	Rio de Janeiro	23rd to 26th			
Manuel Ferraz de Campos Sales	São Paulo	22nd to 23rd; 28th to 29th			
Manuel Francisco Machado	Amazonas	21st to 25th			
Manuel Gomes Ribeiro	Alagoas	25th to 26th; 28th to 31st			
Manuel Inácio Belfort Vieira	Maranhão	24th to 28th			
Manuel Joaquim de Mendonça Martins	Alagoas	32nd to 35th			
Manuel José de Araújo Góis	Alagoas	27th to 33rd			
Manuel José Duarte	Alagoas	25th to 28th			
Manuel Martins Torres	Rio de Janeiro	25th to 26th			
Manuel Messias de Gusmão Lira	Alagoas	22nd to 24th			
Manuel Pedro Vilaboim	São Paulo	35th			
Manuel Prisciliano de Oliveira Valadão	Sergipe	27th to 29th; 31st to 32nd			
Manuel Silvino Monjardim	Espírito Santo	33rd to 35th			
Manuel Victorino Pereira	Bahia	22nd to 23rd			
Marcílio Teixeira de Lacerda	Espírito Santo	31st to 32nd			
Marins Alves de Camargo	Paraná	34th to 35th			
Martinho César da Silveira Garcez	Sergipe	25th to 28th			
Maurício Gracho Cardoso	Sergipe	32nd to 35th			
Melquíades Mário de Sá Freire	Distrito Federal	28th to 30th			
Miguel da Rocha Lima	Goiás	33rd to 35th			
Miguel Joaquim Ribeiro de Carvalho	Rio de Janeiro	30th to 35th			
Nestor Gomes	Espírito Santo	28th to 35th			
Nilo Procópio Peçanha	Rio de Janeiro	26th; 29th; 32nd to 33rd			
Olegário Dias Maciel	Minas Gerais	35th			
Olegário Herculano da Silveira Pinto	Goiás	32nd to 35th			
Olímpio de Sousa Campos	Sergipe	26th to 27th			
Otacílio Camelo de Albuquerque	Paraíba	32nd to 33rd			
Otacílio de Carvalho Camará	Distrito Federal	31st			
Pedro Augusto Borges	Ceará	26th to 31st			
Pedro Celestino Correia da Costa	Mato Grosso	31st to 32nd; 34th to 35th			
Pedro Costa Rego	Alagoas	35th			
Pedro da Cunha Pedrosa	Paraíba	29th to 32nd			
Pedro Francisco Rodrigues do Lago	Bahia	32nd to 35th			
Pedro Paulino da Fonseca	Alagoas	21st to 22nd			
Pedro Velho de Albuquerque Maranhão	Rio Grande do Norte	24th to 27th			
Prudente José de Morais e Barros	São Paulo	21st to 23rd			
Quintino Bocaiuva	Rio de Janeiro	21st to 25th			
Raimundo Artur Vasconcelos	Piauí	26th to 27th			
Raimundo Pontes de Miranda	Alagoas	29th to 32nd			
Ramiro Fortes de Barcelos	Rio Grande do Sul	25th to 27th			
Raul Soares de Moura	Minas Gerais	32nd			
Raulino Júlio Adolfo Horn	Santa Catarina	21st to 24th			
Raimundo Nina Ribeiro	Pará	22nd to 23rd			
Rivadávia da Cunha Correia	Rio Grande do Sul	30th to 31st			
Rui Barbosa de Oliveira	Bahia	21st to 32nd			
Serapião de Aguiar Melo	Sergipe	29th			
Severino dos Santos Vieira	Bahia	23rd to 24th; 27th to 29th			
Sigismundo Antônio Gonçalves	Pernambuco	25th to 29th			
Silvério José Nery	Amazonas	25th to 35th			
Teodoro Alves Pacheco	Piauí	21st to 22nd			
Teodureto Carlos de Faria Souto	Ceará	21st to 22nd			
Tobias do Rego Monteiro	Rio Grande do Norte	32nd			
Tomás de Paula Pessoa Rodrigues	Ceará	33rd to 35th			
Tomás Delfino dos Santos	Distrito Federal	23rd to 27th			
Tomás Pompeu Pinto Accioli	Ceará	28th to 31st			
Tomás Rodrigues da Cruz	Sergipe	21st to 22nd			
Ubaldino do Amaral Fontoura	Paraná	22nd to 23rd			
Urbano Coelho de Gouveia	Goiás	26th to 28th			
Urbano Santos da Costa Araújo	Maranhão	27th to 29th			
Valfredo Soares dos Santos Leal	Paraíba	26th to 30th			
Venâncio Augusto de Magalhães Neiva	Paraíba	31st to 35th			
Vicente Machado da Silva Lima	Paraná	23rd to 27th			
Vidal Ramos	Santa Catarina	30th to 34th			
Virgílio Clímaco Damásio	Bahia	21st to 28th			
Vitorino Ribeiro Carneiro Monteiro	Rio Grande do Sul	27th to 31st			
Washington Luís Pereira de Sousa	São Paulo	33rd			

== Senators in the Vargas era (1930–1945) ==
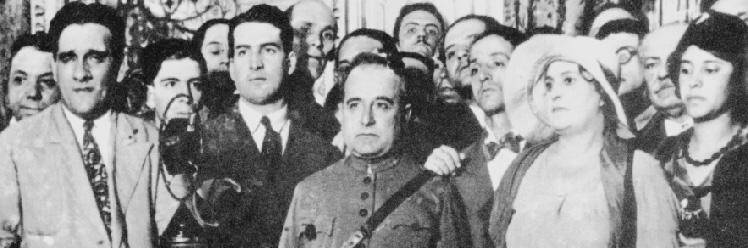
Getúlio Vargas in the Catete Palace on 31 October 1930, a few days after the Revolution of 1930.

The Revolution of 1930 marked the end of the Old Republic. President Washington Luís was deposed; the swearing-in of President-elect Julio Prestes was blocked, on the grounds that the election had been rigged by his supporters; the 1891 Constitution was abrogated, the National Congress was dissolved and the provisional military junta ceded power to Vargas. Federal intervention in State governments increased and the political landscape was altered by suppressing the traditional oligarchies of São Paulo and Minas Gerais states.

Name	Legislature	State
Abel Chermont	37th	Pará
Abelardo Leão Conduru	37th	Pará
Alfredo Augusto Guimarães Backer	37th	Rio de Janeiro
Alfredo Augusto da Mata	37th	Amazonas
Antônio Jorge Machado Lima	37th	Paraná
Antônio Garcia de Medeiros Neto	37th	Bahia
Artur Ferreira da Costa	37th	Santa Catarina
Augusto César Leite	37th	Sergipe
Augusto Simões Lopes	37th	Rio Grande do Sul
Clodomir Serra Serrão Cardoso	37th	Maranhão
Edgar Cavalcanti de Arruda	37th	Ceará
Elói Castriciano de Sousa	37th	Rio Grande do Norte
Flávio Carvalho Guimarães	37th	Paraná
Francisco Flores da Cunha	37th	Rio Grande do Sul
Genaro Sales Pinheiro	37th	Espírito Santo
Genésio Euvaldo de Morais Rego	37th	Maranhão
Jerônimo Monteiro Filho	37th	Espírito Santo
João Jones Gonçalves da Rocha	37th	Distrito Federal
João Pacheco de Oliveira	37th	Bahia
João Vilas Boas	37th	Mato Grosso
Joaquim Inácio de Carvalho Filho	37th	Rio Grande do Norte
José Alcântara Machado de Oliveira	37th	São Paulo
José Américo de Almeida	37th	Paraíba
José Eduardo de Macedo Soares	37th	Rio de Janeiro
José Monteiro Ribeiro Junqueira	37th	Minas Gerais
José Pires Rebelo	37th	Piauí
José de Sá Bezerra Cavalcanti	37th	Pernambuco
Júlio Cesário de Melo	37th	Distrito Federal
Leandro Maynard Maciel	37th	Sergipe
Leopoldo Tavares da Cunha Melo	37th	Amazonas
Luís Mendes Ribeiro Gonçalves	37th	Piauí
Mário de Alencastro Caiado	37th	Goiás
Manuel César de Góis Monteiro	37th	Alagoas
Manuel Veloso Borges	37th	Paraíba
Nero de Macedo Carvalho	37th	Goiás
Paulo de Morais Barros	37th	São Paulo
Pedro Costa Rego	37th	Alagoas
Tomaz de Oliveira Lobo	37th	Pernambuco
Valdemar Cromwell do Rego Falcão	37th	Ceará
Valdomiro de Barros Magalhães	37th	Minas Gerais
Vespasiano Barbosa Martins	37th	Mato Grosso
Vidal José de Oliveira Ramos Júnior	37th	Santa Catarina

== Senators of the Second Brazilian Republic (1945–1963) ==
The Second Brazilian Republic was marked by political instability and military's pressure on civilian politicians which ended with the 1964 Brazilian coup d'état and establishment of Brazilian military government. In 1945, President Getúlio Vargas was deposed by a bloodless military coup, but his influence in Brazilian politics remained until the end of the Second Republic. During this period, three parties dominated national politics. Two of them were pro-Vargas — the Brazilian Labour Party (Partido Trabalhista Brasileiro, PTB) to the left and the Social Democratic Party (Partido social Democrático, PSD) in the center — and another anti-Vargas, the rightist National Democratic Union (União Democrática Nacional, UDN).

Name	State	Legislature(s)
Abelardo de Araújo Jurema	Paraíba	39th to 40th
Abilon de Sousa Naves	Paraná	40th to 41st
Acrísio Fúlvio de Miranda Correia	Pará	40th
Adalberto Jorge Rodrigues Ribeiro	Paraíba	38th to 39th
Afonso Arinos de Melo Franco	Guanabara	41st
Afrânio Salgado Lages	Alagoas	41st
Agripa de Castro Faria	Santa Catarina	39th
Aguinaldo Caiado de Castro	Distrito Federal	39th to 41st
Alberto Pasqualini	Rio Grande do Sul	39th to 40th
Albino Silva da Fonseca	Sergipe	41st
Alexandre Marcondes Machado Filho	São Paulo	38th to 39th
Alexandre Zacarias de Assunção	Pará	40th to 41st
Alfredo da Silva Neves	Rio de Janeiro	38th to 39th
Alfredo Nasser	Goiás	38th to 39th
Alfredo Salim Duailibe	Maranhão	40th to 41st
Alô Ticoulat Guimarães	Paraná	40th to 41st
Altivo Mendes Linhares	Rio de Janeiro	39th
Aluísio Fragoso de Lima Campos	Maranhão	39th
Aluísio Lopes de Carvalho Filho	Bahia	38th to 39th; 41st
Álvaro Adolfo da Silveira	Pará	38th to 40th
Álvaro Botelho Maia	Amazonas	38th to 39th
Álvaro Sinfrônio Bandeira de Melo	Amazonas	39th
Annibal Di Primio Beck	Rio Grande do Sul	40th
Antônio Alexandre Bayma	Maranhão	39th
Antônio Bezerra Baltar	Pernambuco	41st
Antônio Carvalho Guimarães	Maranhão	39th
Antônio de Barros Carvalho	Pernambuco	40th to 41st
Antônio de Freitas Cavalcanti	Alagoas	39th to 41st
Antônio de Novais Filho	Pernambuco	38th to 41st
Antônio Emídio de Barros Filho	São Paulo	40th to 41st
Antônio Pedro Martins Júnior	Pará	41st
Antônio Pereira da Silva Moacir	Bahia	38th to 39th
Antônio Ribeiro Casado	Alagoas	40th
Antovilla Rodrigues Mourão Vieira	Amazonas	39th to 41st
Apolônio Jorge de Faria Sales	Pernambuco	38th to 40th
Argemiro de Figueiredo	Paraíba	39th to 41st
Arlindo Rodrigues	Rio de Janeiro	40th to 41st
Arnon Afonso de Farias Melo	Alagoas	40th to 41st
Armando Pereira Correia da Câmara	Rio Grande do Sul	39th to 40th
Artur Bernardes Filho	Minas Gerais	38th to 40th
Arthur Ferreira dos Santos	Paraná	38th to 39th
Ari de Siqueira Viana	Espírito Santo	40th to 41st
Attilio Vivacqua	Espírito Santo	38th to 41st
Augusto Maynard Gomes	Sergipe	38th to 40th
Auro Soares de Moura Andrade	São Paulo	40th to 41st
Benedito Mário Calazans	São Paulo	40th to 41st
Benedito Valadares Ribeiro	Minas Gerais	39th to 41st
Brasílio Celestino de Oliveira	Santa Catarina	41st
Camilo Nogueira da Gama	Minas Gerais	41st
Camilo Teixeira Mércio	Rio Grande do Sul	39th
Carlos Alberto Lúcio Bittencourt	Minas Gerais	39th to 40th
Carlos Alfredo Simch	Rio Grande do Sul	39th
Carlos Fernando Monteiro Lindenberg	Espírito Santo	41st
Carlos Gomes de Oliveira	Santa Catarina	39th to 40th
Carlos Viriato de Sabóia	Ceará	38th to 41st
César Lacerda de Vergueiro	São Paulo	39th to 40th
Cícero Teixeira de Vasconcelos	Alagoas	38th to 39th
Clodomir Serra Serrão Cardoso	Maranhão	38th to 39th
Daniel Krieger	Rio Grande do Sul	40th to 41st
Dário Délio Cardoso	Goiás	38th to 39th
Dinarte de Medeiros Mariz	Rio Grande do Norte	39th to 40th
Djair Falcão Brindeiro	Pernambuco	39th
Domingos Vellasco	Goiás	39th to 40th
Drault Ernnany de Melo e Silva	Paraíba	39th
Durval Neves da Rocha	Bahia	39th to 40th
Durval Rodrigues da Cruz	Sergipe	38th to 39th
Edson Pitombo Cavalcanti	Espírito Santo	40th
Eduardo de Azevedo Ribeiro	Pará	38th to 38th
Epitácio Pessoa Cavalcanti de Albuquerque	Paraíba	38th to 39th
Ernesto Rodrigues Dorneles	Rio Grande do Sul	38th to 39th
Esperidião Lopes de Farias Júnior	Alagoas	39th
Etelvino Lins de Albuquerque	Pernambuco	38th to 39th
Euclides Vieira	São Paulo	38th to 39th
Eugênio Barros	Maranhão	40th to 41st
Evandro Mendes Viana	Maranhão	38th to 38th
Ezechias Jerônimo da Rocha	Alagoas	39th to 40th
Fausto Augusto Borges Cabral	Ceará	40th to 41st
Fernando Correia da Costa	Mato Grosso	40th to 41st
Fernando de Melo Viana	Minas Gerais	38th to 39th
Filinto Müller	Mato Grosso	38th to 41st
Flávio Carvalho Guimarães	Paraná	38th to 39th
Francisco Benjamin Gallotti	Santa Catarina	38th to 41st
Francisco de Assis Chateaubriand Bandeira de Melo	Paraíba	39th
Francisco de Assis Chateaubriand Bandeira de Melo	Maranhão	40th
Francisco de Meneses Pimentel	Ceará	40th to 41st
Francisco de Paula Porto	Paraíba	39th
Francisco de Sá Tinoco	Rio de Janeiro	38th to 40th
Francisco Moreira de Sousa	Maranhão	39th
Frederico Nunes da Silva	Goiás	40th to 41st
Gaspar Duarte Velloso	Paraná	40th to 41st
Geraldo Guimarães Lindgren	Rio Grande do Sul	41st
Getúlio Dorneles Vargas	Rio Grande do Sul	38th to 39th
Gilberto Marinho	Distrito Federal	40th to 41st
Guido Fernando Mondin	Rio Grande do Sul	40th to 41st
Guilherme Malaquias dos Santos Júnior	Distrito Federal	39th to 40th
Hamilton de Lacerda Nogueira	Distrito Federal	38th to 39th
Heitor Medeiros	Mato Grosso	40th
Henrique de Novais	Espírito Santo	38th
Heribaldo Dantas Vieira	Sergipe	40th to 41st
Irineu Bornhausen	Santa Catarina	40th to 41st
Ismar de Góis Monteiro	Alagoas	38th to 39th
Ivo d'Aquino Fonseca	Santa Catarina	38th to 39th
Jarbas Cardoso de Albuquerque Maranhão	Pernambuco	39th to 41st
Jefferson de Aguiar	Espírito Santo	41st to 42nd
Dix-Huit Rosado	Rio Grande do Norte	40th to 42nd
Jerônimo Coimbra Bueno	Goiás	40th to 41st
João Cavalcanti Arruda	Paraíba	40th to 41st
João de Lima Teixeira	Bahia	40th to 41st
João Guilherme Lameira Bittencourt	Pará	40th to 41st
João Lima Guimarães	Minas Gerais	40th to 41st
João Mendes Olímpio de Melo	Piauí	39th to 41st
João Prisco dos Santos	Pará	39th to 40th
João Severiano da Câmara	Rio Grande do Norte	38th
João Vilas-Boas	Mato Grosso	38th to 41st
Joaquim de Lima Pires Ferreira	Piauí	38th to 39th
Magalhães Barata	Pará	38th to 40th
Joaquim Lobão da Silveira	Pará	41st
Joaquim Pedro Salgado Filho	Rio Grande do Sul	38th
Joaquim Santos Parente	Piauí	40th to 42nd
Jones dos Santos Neves	Espírito Santo	38th to 39th
Jorge Braga Pinheiro	Rio Grande do Sul	38th to 39th
Jorge Campos Maynard	Sergipe	40th to 41st
José Américo de Almeida	Paraíba	38th to 39th
José Augusto Meira Dantas	Pará	38th to 39th
José Carlos Pereira Pinto	Rio de Janeiro	38th to 39th
José da Costa Paranhos	Goiás	39th to 40th
José da Costa Pereira	Goiás	39th to 41st
José de Mendonça Clark	Piauí	40th
José Feliciano Ferreira	Goiás	41st
José Ferreira de Sousa	Rio Grande do Norte	38th to 39th
José Fortunato Ribeiro	Espírito Santo	39th
José Georgino Alves e Sousa Avelino	Rio Grande do Norte	38th to 41st
José Lourenço Dias	Goiás	38th
José Mário Porto	Paraíba	40th
José Moreira Bastos Filho	Rio de Janeiro	40th
José Neiva de Sousa	Maranhão	38th to 39th
José Parsifal Barroso	Ceará	39th to 41st
José Victorino Correia	Piauí	41st
Júlio César Leite	Sergipe	39th to 40th
Juracy Montenegro Magalhães	Bahia	39th to 41st
Juscelino Kubitschek	Goiás	41st
Juvenal Lino de Matos	São Paulo	39th to 41st
Kerginaldo Cavalcanti de Albuquerque	Rio Grande do Norte	38th to 40th
Landulfo Alves de Almeida	Bahia	38th to 39th
Lauro Dantas Hora	Sergipe	40th
Leônidas de Castro Melo	Piauí	40th to 41st
Leopoldo Tavares Cunha Melo	Amazonas	39th to 41st
Levindo Eduardo Coelho	Minas Gerais	38th to 39th
Lineu Prestes	São Paulo	40th
Lourival Fontes	Sergipe	39th to 41st
Lúcio Correia	Santa Catarina	38th to 39th
Luís Carlos Prestes	Distrito Federal	38th
Luis Lopes Varela	Rio Grande do Norte	39th
Luís Pinto Ferreira	Pernambuco	41st to 42nd
Luís Sebastião Guedes Alcoforado	Pernambuco	40th
Luís Tinoco da Fonseca	Espírito Santo	38th to 39th
Luís Mendes Ribeiro Gonçalves	Piauí	38th to 39th
Luís Rodolfo Miranda	São Paulo	38th to 39th
Manuel Anísio Jobim	Amazonas	39th
Manoel do Nascimento Fernandes Távora	Ceará	38th to 41st
Manuel Lutterbach Nunes	Rio de Janeiro	40th to 41st
Manoel Severiano Nunes	Amazonas	38th to 39th
Mário de Andrade Ramos	Distrito Federal	38th to 39th
Mario Motta	Mato Grosso	39th to 40th
Martiniano José Fernandes	Pernambuco	39th
Matias Olímpio de Melo	Piauí	38th to 41st
Mem de Azambuja Sá	Rio Grande do Sul	40th to 41st
Miguel de Oliveira Couto Filho	Rio de Janeiro	40th to 41st
Milton Soares Campos	Minas Gerais	40th to 41st
Moacir Sobral Barreto	Sergipe	40th
Moisés Lupion de Tróia	Paraná	39th to 40th
Mozart Brasileiro Pereira do Lago	Distrito Federal	39th
Napoleão de Alencastro Guimarães	Distrito Federal	39th to 40th
Nelson Firmo de Oliveira	Pernambuco	40th to 41st
Nelson Maculan	Paraná	41st
Nelson Tenório de Oliveira	Alagoas	41st
Nereu de Oliveira Ramos	Santa Catarina	38th to 40th
Nestor Massena	Minas Gerais	39th
Olavo Oliveira	Ceará	38th to 39th
Onofre Muniz Gomes de Lima	Ceará	39th to 40th
Osvaldo Moura Brasil do Amaral	Distrito Federal	40th
Otacílio Jurema	Paraíba	40th
Otávio Mangabeira	Bahia	40th to 41st
Othon Mader	Paraná	38th to 40th
Ovídio Antunes Teixeira	Bahia	40th
Paulino Lopes da Costa	Mato Grosso	41st
Paulo Abreu	São Paulo	40th to 41st
Paulo da Silva Fernandes	Rio de Janeiro	39th to 41st
Paulo Fender	Pará	41st
Paulo Ramos Coelho	Amazonas	41st
Pedro Aurélio de Góis Monteiro	Alagoas	38th
Pedro Dinis Gonçalves Filho	Sergipe	39th
Pedro Ludovico Teixeira	Goiás	38th to 41st
Péricles Pinto da Silva	Minas Gerais	39th to 40th
Plínio Pompeu de Sabóia Magalhães	Ceará	38th to 39th
Raimundo Bandeira Vaughan	Rio de Janeiro	41st
Raimundo Melo de Arêa Leão	Piauí	39th to 40th
Raimundo Públio Bandeira de Melo	Maranhão	41st
Raimundo Públio Bandeira de Melo	Paraíba	41st
Reginaldo Fernandes de Oliveira	Rio Grande do Norte	40th to 41st
Remy Bayma Archer da Silva	Maranhão	40th to 41st
Renato Onofre Pinto Aleixo	Bahia	38th to 39th
Roberto Cochrane Simonsen	São Paulo	38th
Roberto Glasser	Paraná	38th to 39th
Rodrigo de Oliveira Lobo	Santa Catarina	40th
Rui Soares Palmeira	Alagoas	39th to 41st
Rui Carneiro	Paraíba	39th to 42nd
Salviano Leite Rolim	Paraíba	41st to 42nd
Saulo Saul Ramos	Santa Catarina	39th to 41st
Sebastião Archer da Silva	Maranhão	40th to 41st
Sérgio Bezerra Marinho	Rio Grande do Norte	40th to 41st
Silvério Del Caro	Espírito Santo	41st
Silvestre Péricles de Góis Monteiro	Alagoas	40th to 42nd
Sílvio Curvo	Mato Grosso	39th to 40th
Sinval da Silva Coutinho	Pará	38th to 38th
Taciano Gomes de Melo	Goiás	40th to 41st
Tarcísio de Almeida Miranda	Rio de Janeiro	39th to 40th
Valdemar da Rocha Dias	Mato Grosso	39th
Valdemar Pedrosa	Amazonas	38th to 39th
Valter do Prado Franco	Sergipe	38th to 39th
Venâncio Pessoa Igrejas Lopes	Distrito Federal	41st
Vespasiano Barbosa Martins	Mato Grosso	38th to 39th
Vitorino de Brito Freire	Maranhão	38th to 41st
Virgínio de Veloso Borges	Paraíba	39th
Vivaldo Palma Lima Filho	Amazonas	39th to 41st
Waldemar de Moura Santos	Piauí	40th
Waldir Bouhid	Pará	40th
Vergniaud Wanderley	Paraíba	38th to 38th

== Senators of the Military Regime (1964–1987) ==
The Brazilian military government began with the 1964 coup d'état led by the Armed Forces against the administration of President João Goulart—who, having been vice-president, had assumed the office of president upon the resignation of the democratically elected president Jânio Quadros—and ended when José Sarney took office on March 15, 1985 as President.

Name	State	Legislature(s)
Aarão Steinbruch	Rio de Janeiro	42nd to 43rd
Adalberto Correia Sena	Acre	42nd to 46th
Aderbal de Araújo Jurema	Pernambuco	46th to 47th
Adolfo de Oliveira Franco	Paraná	42nd to 44th
Afonso Arinos de Melo Franco	Guanabara	42nd
Afonso Alves de Camargo Neto	Paraná	46th to 47th
Agenor Nunes de Maria	Rio Grande do Norte	45th to 46th
Álano Barcelos	Rio de Janeiro	46th
Albano do Prado Pimentel Franco	Sergipe	47th
Alberto Lavinas	Rio de Janeiro	46th to 47th
Alberto Tavares Silva	Piauí	46th to 47th
Alcides Paio	Rondônia	47th
Alexandre Alves Costa	Maranhão	44th to 47th
Alexandre Zacharias de Assumpção	Pará	40th to 42nd
Alfredo José de Campos Melo	Minas Gerais	47th
Almir Santos Pinto	Ceará	46th to 47th
Alô Ticoulat Guimarães	Paraná	42nd
Aluísio da Costa Chaves	Pará	46th to 47th
Aloísio Lopes de Carvalho Filho	Bahia	42nd to 43rd
Altevir Leal	Acre	45th to 47th
Álvaro Botelho Maia	Amazonas	43rd
Alvaro Dias	Paraná	47th
Álvaro Luís Bocaiúva Catão	Santa Catarina	43rd
Amauri de Oliveira e Silva	Paraná	42nd
André Franco Montoro	São Paulo	44th to 46th
Antônio Balbino de Carvalho Filho	Bahia	42nd to 44th
Antônio Carlos Konder Reis	Santa Catarina	42nd to 45th
Antônio da Silva Fernandes	Bahia	43rd to 45th
Antônio de Barros Carvalho	Pernambuco	42nd
Antônio Emídio de Barros Filho	São Paulo	42nd
Antônio Jorge de Queiroz Jucá	Ceará	42nd
Antônio Lomanto Júnior	Bahia	46th to 47th
Antônio Mendes Canale	Mato Grosso	45th to 46th
Antônio Osvaldo do Amaral Furlan	São Paulo	46th to 47th
Antônio Pedro Martins Junior	Pará	41st to 42nd
Antônio Pereira Diniz	Paraíba	43rd
Antovila Rodrigues Mourão Vieira	Amazonas	42nd
Aquiles Almeida Cruz	Maranhão	43rd
Argemiro de Figueiredo	Paraíba	42nd to 44th
Armando de Miranda Storni	Goiás	42nd to 43rd
Arnaldo Guedes Pinto de Paiva	Alagoas	43rd
Arnon Afonso de Farias Melo	Alagoas	42nd to 47th
Arnor Damiani	Santa Catarina	46th to 47th
Artur Leite da Silveira	Bahia	42nd
Artur Virgílio do Carmo Ribeiro Filho	Amazonas	42nd to 43rd
Ari de Siqueira Viana	Espírito Santo	42nd
Atílio Francisco Xavier Fontana	Santa Catarina	42nd to 44th
Augusto do Prado Franco	Sergipe	44th to 46th
Aurélio Viana da Cunha Lima	Guanabara	42nd to 44th
Auro Soares de Moura Andrade	São Paulo	42nd to 43rd
Benedito Mário Calazans	São Paulo	40th to 42nd
Benedito Valadares Ribeiro	Minas Gerais	42nd to 44th
Benedito Vicente Ferreira	Goiás	44th to 47th
Bernardino Soares Viana	Piauí	46th
Camilo Nogueira da Gama	Minas Gerais	42nd to 44th
Carlos Alberto Alves de Carvalho Pinto	São Paulo	42nd to 45th
Carlos Alberto de Sousa	Rio Grande do Norte	47th
Carlos Alberto Gomes Chiarelli	Rio Grande do Sul	47th
Carlos Benigno Pereira de Lira Neto	Alagoas	47th
Carlos Fernando Monteiro Lindenberg	Espírito Santo	42nd to 45th
Carlos Jereissati	Ceará	42nd
Carlos Mauro Cabral Benevides	Ceará	45th to 46th
Celso Ramos Branco	Santa Catarina	42nd to 45th
César Cals de Oliveira Filho	Ceará	46th to 47th
Cid Feijó Sampaio	Pernambuco	47th
Claudionor Couto Roriz	Rondônia	47th
Clodomir Teixeira Millet	Maranhão	42nd to 45th
Clóvis de Azevedo Maia	Acre	43rd
Daniel Krieger	Rio Grande do Sul	42nd to 45th
Danton Pinheiro Jobim	Guanabara	44th to 45th
Desiré Guarani e Silva	Amazonas	42nd to 43rd
Dinarte de Medeiros Mariz	Rio Grande do Norte	42nd to 47th
Dirceu Cardoso	Espírito Santo	45th to 46th
Dirceu Mendes Arcoverde	Piauí	46th
Domício Gondim Barreto	Paraíba	42nd to 45th
Dulce Sales Cunha Braga	São Paulo	46th
Dylton Augusto Rodrigues da Costa	Sergipe	42nd to 43rd
Edmundo Fernandes Levi	Amazonas	42nd to 44th
Eduardo Assmar	Acre	42nd
Eduardo Catalão	Bahia	42nd to 43rd
Edward Catete Pinheiro	Pará	42nd to 45th
Emival Ramos Caiado	Goiás	44th
Enéas Eugênio Pereira Faria	Paraná	47th
Ernani do Amaral Peixoto	Rio de Janeiro	44th to 47th
Eugênio de Barros	Maranhão	40th to 42nd
Eunice Mafalda Michilles	Amazonas	46th to 47th
Eurico Vieira de Resende	Espírito Santo	42nd to 45th
Evandro das Neves Carreira	Amazonas	45th to 46th
Evelásio Vieira	Santa Catarina	45th to 46th
Fausto Gaioso Castelo Branco	Piauí	44th to 46th
Fernando Corrêa da Costa	Mato Grosso	42nd to 45th
Fernando Henrique Cardoso	São Paulo	47th
Filinto Müller	Mato Grosso	42nd to 44th
Flávio da Costa Brito	Amazonas	43rd to 45th
Francisco Accioly Rodrigues da Costa Filho	Paraná	44th to 46th
Francisco de Meneses Pimentel	Ceará	40th to 44th
Francisco Duarte Filho	Rio Grande do Norte	43rd to 44th
Francisco Leite Chaves	Paraná	45th to 46th
Francisco Leite Neto	Sergipe	42nd
Francisco Pessoa de Queiroz	Pernambuco	42nd to 44th
Gabriel Hermes Filho	Pará	46th to 47th
Gastão de Matos Müller	Mato Grosso	42nd; 46th to 47th
Geraldo Gurgel de Mesquita	Acre	44th to 45th
Gilberto Marinho	Guanabara	42nd to 43rd
Godwasser Pereira dos Santos	Acre	42nd
Guido Fernando Mondin	Rio Grande do Sul	40th to 45th
Guilherme Gracindo Soares Palmeira	Alagoas	47th
Gustavo Capanema	Minas Gerais	44th to 46th
Heitor Dias Pereira	Bahia	44th to 46th
Hélio Mota Gueiros	Pará	47th
Helvídio Nunes de Barros	Piauí	44th to 47th
Henrique Antônio Santillo	Goiás	46th to 47th
Henrique de La Rocque Almeida	Maranhão	45th to 46th
Heráclito Guimarães Rollemberg	Sergipe	47th
Heribaldo Dantas Vieira	Sergipe	40th to 42nd
Hermann de Medeiros Torres	Alagoas	42nd
Humberto Coutinho de Lucena	Paraíba	46th to 47th
Humberto Neder	Mato Grosso	42nd
Irineu Bornhausen	Santa Catarina	40th to 42nd
Íris Célia Cabanellas Zannini	Acre	47th
Italívio Martins Coelho	Mato Grosso	44th to 46th
Itamar Augusto Cautiero Franco	Minas Gerais	45th to 47th
Ivan Orestes Bonato	Santa Catarina	47th a
Ivandro Moura Cunha Lima	Paraíba	45th to 46th
Jaison Tupi Barreto	Santa Catarina	46th to 47th
Jamil Haddad	Rio de Janeiro	47th
Jarbas Gonçalves Passarinho	Pará	43rd to 46th
Jefferson de Aguiar	Espírito Santo	42nd
Dix-Huit Rosado	Rio Grande do Norte	42nd
Jessé Pinto Freire	Rio Grande do Norte	44th to 46th
João Abraão Sobrinho	Goiás	42nd to 43rd
João Agripino Filho	Paraíba	42nd
João Américo de Souza	Maranhão	47th
João Batista de Vasconcelos Torres	Rio de Janeiro	42nd to 45th
João Bosco Ramos de Lima	Amazonas	46th
João Calisto Lobo	Piauí	47th
João Castelo Ribeiro Gonçalves	Maranhão	47th
João Cleofas de Oliveira	Pernambuco	42nd to 45th
João de Matos Leão	Paraná	44th to 45th
João de Medeiros Calmon	Espírito Santo	44th to 47th
João dos Santos Braga Júnior	Amazonas	45th to 46th
João Gilvan Rocha	Sergipe	45th to 46th
João Lúcio da Silva	Alagoas	47th
João Pedro Gouveia Carvalho Vieira	Rio de Janeiro	42nd to 43rd
João Renato Franco	Pará	44th to 46th
Joaquim Lobão da Silveira	Pará	42nd to 44th
Joaquim Santos Parente	Piauí	40th to 42nd
Jorge Kalume	Acre	46th to 47th
Jorge Konder Bornhausen	Santa Catarina	47th
Josaphat Ramos Marinho	Bahia	42nd to 44th
José Augusto Ferreira Filho	Minas Gerais	44th to 45th
José Benedito Canelas	Mato Grosso	46th to 47th
José Bernardino Lindoso	Amazonas	44th to 46th
José Bezerra de Araújo	Rio Grande do Norte	42nd
José Cândido Ferraz	Piauí	42nd to 44th
José Cortez Pereira de Araújo	Rio Grande do Norte	42nd
José de Faria Tavares	Minas Gerais	42nd to 43rd
José de Magalhães Pinto	Minas Gerais	44th to 45th
José de Souza Martins Filho	Rio Grande do Norte	46th to 47th
José Dias de Macedo	Ceará	47th
José do Nascimento Caixeta	Goiás	46th to 47th
José Elias Isaac	Goiás	42nd
José Ermírio de Morais	Pernambuco	42nd to 44th
José Feliciano Ferreira	Goiás	41st to 44th
José Guiomard dos Santos	Acre	42nd to 47th
José Ignácio Ferreira	Espírito Santo	47th
José Lins de Albuquerque	Ceará	46th to 47th
José Manuel Fontanillas Fragelli	Mato Grosso do Sul	46th to 47th
José Passos Porto	Sergipe	46th to 47th
José Raimundo Esteves	Amazonas	44th to 45th
José Richa	Paraná	46th to 47th
José Rollemberg Leite	Sergipe	42nd to 43rd
José Sarney	Maranhão	44th to 47th
José Urbano da Costa Carvalho	Pernambuco	47th
José Valdemar de Alcântara e Silva	Ceará	43rd to 44th
Josué Cláudio de Souza	Amazonas	42nd
Júlio César Leite	Sergipe	42nd to 44th
Juscelino Kubitschek de Oliveira	Goiás	41st to 42nd
Jutahy Borges Magalhães	Bahia	46th to 47th
Juvenal Lino de Matos	São Paulo	42nd to 44th
Kairala José Kairala	Acre	42nd
Laélia Contreiras Agra de Alcântara	Acre	46th
Lázaro Ferreira Barbosa	Goiás	45th to 46th
Leandro Maynard Maciel	Sergipe	42nd to 45th
Lenoir Vargas Ferreira	Santa Catarina	44th to 47th
Leoni Mendonça	Goiás	44th to 45th
Lineu Gomes	São Paulo	42nd
Lourival Baptista	Sergipe	44th to 47th
Luís Carlos Belo Parga	Maranhão	47th
Luís Fernando de Oliveira Freire	Maranhão	46th
Luís Viana Filho	Bahia	45th to 47th
Luís de Gonzaga Barros	Rio Grande do Norte	44th to 45th
Luiz de Souza Cavalcante	Alagoas	44th to 47th
Luís Pinto Ferreira	Pernambuco	41st to 42nd
Manuel Cordeiro Vilaça	Rio Grande do Norte	42nd to 44th
Manoel da Silva Dias	Piauí	42nd
Manuel Gonçalves Ferreira Filho	São Paulo	46th
Marcelo Nunes de Alencar	Guanabara	43rd
Marcelo Miranda Soares	Mato Grosso do Sul	47th
Marco Antônio de Oliveira Maciel	Pernambuco	47th
Marcondes Iran Benevides Gadelha	Paraíba	47th
Marcos de Barros Freire	Pernambuco	45th to 46th
Maria Syrlei Donato	Santa Catarina	46th
Mário de Sousa Martins	Guanabara	43rd
Mário Maia	Acre	47th
Maurício Brasilino Leite	Paraíba	47th
Mauro Borges Teixeira	Goiás	47th
Mem de Azambuja Sá	Rio Grande do Sul	42nd to 44th
Miguel Couto Filho	Rio de Janeiro	40th to 42nd
Miguel Monteiro Barros Lins	Maranhão	42nd
Milton Bezerra Cabral	Paraíba	44th to 47th
Milton Blanco de Abrunhosa Trindade	Pará	43rd to 45th
Milton Ribeiro Meneses	Paraná	42nd to 43rd
Milton Soares Campos	Minas Gerais	40th to 44th
Moacir Dalla	Espírito Santo	46th to 47th
Moacir Torres Duarte	Rio Grande do Norte	46th to 47th
Morvan Aloísio Acaiaba de Resende	Minas Gerais	47th
Murilo Carneiro Leão Paraíso	Pernambuco	45th to 46th
Murilo Paulino Badaró	Minas Gerais	46th to 47th
Ney Amintas de Barros Braga	Paraná	43rd to 45th
Nelson de Sousa Carneiro	Guanabara	44th to 45th
Nelson de Sousa Carneiro	Rio de Janeiro	46th to 47th
Nelson Maculan	Paraná	41st to 42nd
Nilo de Sousa Coelho	Pernambuco	46th to 47th
Nivaldo Rodrigues Machado	Pernambuco	47th
Octávio Cesário Pereira Júnior	Paraná	43rd to 44th
Octávio Omar Cardoso	Rio Grande do Sul	46th to 47th
Odacir Soares Rodrigues	Rondônia	47th
Orestes Quércia	São Paulo	45th to 46th
Orlando Gabriel Zancaner	São Paulo	44th to 45th
Oscar Passos	Acre	42nd to 44th
Osíris Pontes	Ceará	46th
Osíris Teixeira	Goiás	44th to 46th
Otair Becker	Santa Catarina	45th to 46th
Otto Cirilo Lehmann	São Paulo	45th to 46th
Paulino Lopes da Costa	Mato Grosso	42nd
Paulo Barros	Espírito Santo	42nd
Paulo Brossard de Sousa Pinto	Rio Grande do Sul	45th to 46th
Paulo Francisco Torres	Rio de Janeiro	42nd to 45th
Paulo Pessoa Guerra	Pernambuco	44th to 45th
Paulo Sarasate Ferreira Lopes	Ceará	42nd to 43rd
Pedro Augusto de Moura Palha	Pará	42nd to 43rd
Pedro Carneiro de Morais e Silva	Pará	42nd to 43rd
Pedro Jorge Simon	Rio Grande do Sul	46th to 47th
Pedro Ludovico Teixeira	Goiás	42nd to 43rd
Pedro Pedrossian	Mato Grosso do Sul	46th
Péricles Pedro da Silva	Goiás	42nd to 43rd
Petrônio Portela Nunes	Piauí	43rd to 46th
Rachid Saldanha Derzi	Mato Grosso do Sul	44th to 47th
Raimundo Gomes de Araújo Parente	Amazonas	46th to 47th
Raul Giuberti	Espírito Santo	42nd to 44th
Reinaldo Galvão Modesto	Rondônia	47th
Renato Ramos da Silva	Santa Catarina	42nd to 43rd
Roberto de Oliveira Campos	Mato Grosso	47th
Roberto Saturnino Braga	Rio de Janeiro	45th to 47th
Roberto Wypych	Paraná	47th
Roisle Alaor Metzker Coutinho	Bahia	47th
Rubens de Melo Braga	Paraná	42nd to 44th
Rubens Vaz da Costa	Pernambuco	47th
Rui Carneiro	Paraíba	41st to 45th
Rui Santos	Bahia	44th to 46th
Rui Soares Palmeira	Alagoas	42nd to 43rd
Salviano Leite Rolim	Paraíba	41st to 42nd
Sebastião Archer da Silva	Maranhão	42nd to 44th
Severo Fagundes Gomes	São Paulo	47th
Sigefredo Pacheco	Piauí	42nd to 44th
Silvestre Péricles de Góis Monteiro	Alagoas	40th to 42nd
Tancredo de Almeida Neves	Minas Gerais	46th
Tarso de Morais Dutra	Rio Grande do Sul	44th to 47th
Teotônio Brandão Vilela	Alagoas	43rd to 46th
Valdon Varjão	Mato Grosso	46th
Valfredo Dantas Gurgel	Rio Grande do Norte	42nd
Vicente de Bezerra Neto	Mato Grosso	42nd to 44th
Vicente Emílio Vuolo	Mato Grosso	46th
Vicente Férrer Augusto Lima	Ceará	42nd
Vitorino de Brito Freire	Maranhão	42nd to 44th
Virgílio de Morais Fernandes Távora	Ceará	44th to 47th
Vivaldo Palma Lima Filho	Amazonas	40th to 42nd
Wilson de Queiroz Campos	Pernambuco	43rd to 45th
Wilson Gonçalves	Ceará	42nd to 45th

== Senators of the New Republic (1987-present) ==
Name	State	Legislature(s)
Abdias do Nascimento	Rio de Janeiro	49th to 50th
Acir Marcos Gurgacz	Rondônia	54th to present
Ademir Galvão Andrade	Pará	50th to 51st
Aécio Neves da Cunha	Mato Grosso	54th to 55th
Aelton José de Freitas	Minas Gerais	51st to 52nd
Afonso Alves de Camargo Neto	Paraná	48th to 49th
Afonso Arinos de Melo Franco	Rio de Janeiro	48th
Airton Quaresma de Oliveira	Amapá	49th
Albano do Prado Pimentel Franco	Sergipe	47th to 50th
Alberto Hoffmann	Rio Grande do Sul	48th
Alberto Tavares Silva	Piauí	51st to 52nd
Albino Boaventura	Goiás	50th to 51st
Alcides José Saldanha	Rio Grande do Sul	46th to 47th
Alcides Muniz Falcão	Alagoas	50th
Alcides Paio	Rondônia	47th to 48th
Alessandro Vieira	Sergipe	56th to present
Alexandre Alves Costa	Maranhão	50th to 51st
Alfredo José de Campos Melo	Minas Gerais	48th to 49th
Alfredo Pereira do Nascimento	Amazonas	53rd to 54th
Almir José de Oliveira Gabriel	Pará	48th to 49th
Aloizio Mercadante Oliva	São Paulo	52nd to 53rd
Aloysio Nunes Ferreira Filho	São Paulo	54th to 55th
Aluizio Bezerra de Oliveira	Acre	48th to 49th
Álvaro dos Santos Pacheco	Piauí	48th to 49th
Alvaro Dias	Paraná	48th; 51st to present
Amazonino Armando Mendes	Amazonas	49th to 50th
Amir Francisco Lando	Rondônia	48th to 52nd
Ana Amélia Lemos	Rio Grande do Sul	54th to 55th
Ana Júlia de Vasconcelos Carepa	Pará	52nd
Ana Rita Esgário	Espírito Santo	54th
Ângela Maria Gomes Portela	Roraima	54th to 55th
Angelo Mário Coronel de Azevedo Martins	Bahia	56th to present
Aníbal Diniz	Acre	54th
Antero Paes de Barros Neto	Mato Grosso	51st to 52nd
Antônio Alves de Queiroz	Goiás	48th to 49th
Antonio Augusto Junho Anastasia	Minas Gerais	55th to present
Antônio Aureliano Sanches de Mendonça	Mato Grosso	54th
Antônio Carlos Magalhães Neto	Bahia	53rd
Antônio Carlos Peixoto de Magalhães	Bahia	50th to 53rd
Antônio Carlos Valadares	Sergipe	50th to 55th
Antônio de Almendra Freitas Neto	Piauí	50th to 51st
Antônio Lomanto Júnior	Bahia	46th to 48th
Antônio Luiz Maia	Tocantins	48th
Antônio Marques da Silva Mariz	Paraíba	49th to 50th
Antônio Mecias Pereira de Jesus	Roraima	56th to present
Antônio Mendes Canale	Mato Grosso do Sul	48th
Antônio Valmir Campelo Bezerra	Distrito Federal	49th to 50th
Antônio Vital do Rêgo Filho	Paraíba	54th
Arlindo Porto Neto	Minas Gerais	50th to 51st
Armando de Queiroz Monteiro Neto	Pernambuco	55th
Armando Monteiro Neto	Pernambuco	54th
Arolde de Oliveira	Rio de Janeiro	56th to present
Arthur Virgílio do Carmo Ribeiro Neto	Amazonas	53rd
Artur da Távola	Rio de Janeiro	50th to 51st
Artur Virgílio do Carmo Ribeiro Neto	Amazonas	52nd
Ataídes de Oliveira	Tocantins	54th to 55th
Augusto Afonso Botelho Neto	Roraima	52nd to 53rd
Áureo Bringel de Melo	Amazonas	48th to 49th
Benedita Sousa da Silva Sampaio	Rio de Janeiro	50th to 51st
Benedito Clayton Veras Alcântara	Ceará	49th to 50th
Benedito de Lira	Alagoas	54th to 55th
Blairo Borges Maggi	Mato Grosso	50th to 51st; 54th to 55th
Carlos Alberto de Carli	Amazonas	48th to 50th
Carlos Alberto de Sousa	Rio Grande do Norte	47th to 48th
Carlos Alberto Dias Viana	Minas Gerais	56th to present
Carlos Alberto Gomes Chiarelli	Rio Grande do Sul	47th to 48th
Carlos Benigno Pereira de Lira Neto	Alagoas	48th
Carlos do Patrocínio Silveira	Tocantins	48th to 51st
Carlos Eduardo de Sousa Braga	Amazonas	54th to present
Carlos Eduardo Torres Gomes	Tocantins	56th to present
Carlos Gomes Bezerra	Mato Grosso	50th to 51st
Carlos Magno Duque Bacelar	Maranhão	49th
Carlos Mauro Cabral Benevides	Ceará	48th to 49th
Carlos Wilson Rocha de Queiroz Campos	Pernambuco	50th to 51st
Casildo João Maldaner	Santa Catarina	50th to 51st; 54th
Cássio Cunha Lima	Paraíba	54th
Cássio Rodrigues da Cunha Lima	Paraíba	55th
César Augusto de Sousa Dias	Roraima	49th to 50th
César Augusto Rabello Borges	Bahia	52nd; 53rd
Cícero Lucena Filho	Paraíba	53rd to 54th
Cid Ferreira Gomes	Ceará	56th to present
Cid Sabóia de Carvalho	Ceará	48th to 49th
Ciro Nogueira Lima Filho	Piauí	54th to present
Clésio Soares de Andrade	Minas Gerais	54th
Confúcio Aires Moura	Rondônia	56th to present
Cristovam Ricardo Cavalcanti Buarque	Distrito Federal	52nd to 55th
Cyro Miranda Júnior	Goiás	54th
Dalírio José Beber	Santa Catarina	55th
Daniella Velloso Borges Ribeiro	Paraíba	56th to present
Darcy Ribeiro	Rio de Janeiro	49th to 50th
Dário Elias Berger	Santa Catarina	55th to present
Dario Pereira de Macedo	Rio Grande do Norte	49th to 50th
David Samuel Alcolumbre Tobelem	Amapá	55th to present
Delcídio do Amaral Gómez	Mato Grosso do Sul	52nd; 53rd to 55th
Demóstenes Lázaro Xavier Torres	Goiás	52nd to 53rd
Dirceu José Carneiro	Santa Catarina	48th to 49th
Divaldo Suruagy	Alagoas	48th to 49th
Djalma Alves Bessa	Bahia	50th to 51st
Djalma Marinho Muniz Falcão	Alagoas	50th to 51st
Eann Styvenson Valentim Mendes	Rio Grande do Norte	56th to present
Edison Lobão	Maranhão	48th; 50th to 54th
Edison Lobão Filho	Maranhão	52nd; 54th to 55th
Eduardo Alves do Amorim	Sergipe	54th to 55th
Eduardo Benedito Lopes	Rio de Janeiro	55th
Eduardo Brandão de Azeredo	Minas Gerais	52nd to 53rd
Eduardo Matarazzo Suplicy	São Paulo	49th to 54th
Efraim de Araújo Morais	Paraíba	52nd to 53rd
Élcio Álvares	Espírito Santo	49th to 50th
Eliseu Resende	Minas Gerais	53rd
Eliziane Pereira Gama Melo	Maranhão	56th to present
Elmano Férrer de Almeida	Piauí	55th to present
Emília Teresinha Xavier Fernandes	Rio Grande do Sul	50th to 51st
Enéas Eugênio Pereira Faria	Paraná	8th to 49th
Epitácio Cafeteira Afonso Pereira	Maranhão	49th to 50th; 53rd to 54th
Ernandes Santos Amorim	Rondônia	50th to 51st
Esperidião Amin Helou Filho	Santa Catarina	49th to 50th; 56th to present
Eunício Lopes de Oliveira	Ceará	54th to 55th
Expedito Gonçalves Ferreira Junior	Rondônia	53rd
Fabiano Contarato Rigotte	Espírito Santo	56th to present
Fábio Pereira de Lucena Bittencourt	Amazonas	48th
Fátima Cleide Rodrigues da Silva	Rondônia	52nd to 53rd
Fernando Affonso Collor de Mello	Alagoas	53rd to 55th
Fernando Bezerra de Sousa Coelho	Pernambuco	55th to present
Fernando Collor	Alagoas	56th
Fernando Coutinho Jorge	Pará	49th to 50th
Fernando de Sousa Flexa Ribeiro	Pará	52nd to 55th
Fernando Henrique Cardoso	São Paulo	47th to 49th
Fernando Luiz Gonçalves Bezerra	Rio Grande do Norte	49th to 52nd
Flaviano Flávio Baptista de Melo	Acre	49th to 50th
Flávio José Arns	Paraná	52nd to 53rd; 56th
Flávio Nantes Bolsonaro	Rio de Janeiro	56th to present
Francelino Pereira dos Santos	Minas Gerais	50th to 51st
Francisco Benjamin Fonseca de Carvalho	Bahia	49th to 50th
Francisco das Chagas Caldas Rodrigues	Piauí	48th to 49th
Francisco de Assis de Moraes Souza	Piauí	52nd to 53rd
Francisco de Assis Rodrigues	Roraima	56th to present
Francisco Guimarães Rollemberg	Sergipe	48th to 49th
Francisco Leite Chaves	Paraná	48th to 49th
Francisco Mozarildo de Melo Cavalcanti	Roraima	51st to 54th
Francisco Oswaldo Neves Dornelles	Rio de Janeiro	53rd to 54th
Garibaldi Alves Filho	Rio Grande do Norte	49th to 53rd; 55th
Geovani Pinheiro Borges	Amapá	52nd
Geraldo Cândido da Silva	Rio de Janeiro	50th to 51st
Geraldo César Althoff	Santa Catarina	50th to 51st
Geraldo Gurgel de Mesquita Júnior	Acre	52nd to 53rd
Geraldo José da Câmara Ferreira de Melo	Rio Grande do Norte	50th to 51st
Gerson Camata	Espírito Santo	48th to 51st; 53rd
Gilberto Flávio Goellner	Mato Grosso	53rd
Gilberto Mestrinho de Medeiros Raposo	Amazonas	51st to 52nd
Gilberto Miranda Batista	Amazonas	49th to 50th
Gilvam Pinheiro Borges	Amapá	50th to 51st; 53rd
Gladson de Lima Cameli	Acre	55th
Gleisi Helena Hoffmann	Paraná	54th to 55th
Guaracy Silveira	Tocantins	55th
Guilherme Gracindo Soares Palmeira	Alagoas	48th to 50th
Hélio Calixto da Costa	Minas Gerais	53rd
Hélio da Costa Campos	Roraima	49th to 50th
Hélio José da Silva Lima	Distrito Federal	55th
Heloísa Helena	Alagoas	51st to 52nd
Henrique do Rego Almeida	Amapá	49th
Heráclito de Sousa Fortes	Piauí	52nd to 53rd
Hugo Napoleão do Rego Neto	Piauí	48th to 51st
Humberto Coutinho de Lucena	Paraíba	48th to 51st
Humberto Sérgio Costa Lima	Pernambuco	54th to present
Ideli Salvatti	Santa Catarina	52nd to 53rd
Ildeu Leonel Oliveira de Paiva	Distrito Federal	50th
Inácio Francisco de Assis Nunes Arruda	Ceará	53rd to 54th
Irajá Silvestre Abreu Filho	Tocantins	56th to present
Iram de Almeida Saraiva	Goiás	48th to 49th
Irapuan Costa Júnior	Goiás	48th to 49th
Iris Rezende Machado	Goiás	50th to 51st
Itamar Augusto Cautiero Franco	Minas Gerais	47th to 48th; 55th
Ivan Orestes Bonato	Santa Catarina	47th to 48th
Ivo Narciso Cassol	Rondônia	54th to 55th
Ivonete Dantas Silva	Rio Grande do Norte	54th
Izalci Lucas Ferreira	Distrito Federal	56th to present
Jacques Silva de Sousa	Goiás	49th
Jader Barbalho	Pará	50th to 51st
Jader Fontenelle Barbalho	Pará	54th to present
Jamil Haddad	Rio de Janeiro	47th to 48th
Jaques Wagner	Bahia	56th to present
Jarbas de Andrade Vasconcelos	Pernambuco	53rd to 54th; 56th
Jarbas Gonçalves Passarinho	Pará	48th to 49th
Jayme Veríssimo de Campos	Mato Grosso	53rd to 54th; 56th
Jean-Paul Prates	Rio Grande do Norte	55th to present
Jefferson Praia Bezerra	Amazonas	53rd
João Alberto de Souza	Maranhão	51st to 52nd; 54th to 55th
João Alberto Rodrigues Capiberibe	Amapá	54th to 55th
João Assis Meira Filho	Distrito Federal	48th to 49th
João Batista de Jesus Ribeiro	Tocantins	52nd; 53rd; 55th
João Batista Mota	Espírito Santo	51st to 52nd
João Bosco Papaléo Paes	Amapá	52nd to 53rd
João Calisto Lobo	Piauí	47th to 48th
João Castelo Ribeiro Gonçalves	Maranhão	47th to 48th
João da Rocha Ribeiro Dias	Tocantins	49th to 50th
João de Medeiros Calmon	Espírito Santo	48th to 49th
João de Paiva Menezes	Pará	48th
João do Nascimento Silva	Alagoas	48th
João Durval Carneiro	Bahia	53rd to 54th
João Evangelista da Costa Tenório	Alagoas	53rd
João França Alves	Roraima	49th to 50th
João José Pereira de Lira	Alagoas	48th
João Raimundo Colombo	Santa Catarina	53rd
João Vicente de Macêdo Claudino	Piauí	53rd to 54th
Joaquim Beato	Espírito Santo	49th
Joaquim Rui Paulilo Bacelar	Bahia	48th to 49th
Joel de Holanda Cordeiro	Pernambuco	49th to 50th
Jonas Pinheiro Borges	Amapá	49th to 51st
Jonas Pinheiro da Silva	Mato Grosso	52nd
Jonice Siqueira Tristão	Espírito Santo	49th to 50th
Jorge Afonso Argello	Distrito Federal	53rd to 54th
Jorge Konder Bornhausen	Santa Catarina	51st to 52nd
Jorge Ney Viana Macedo Neves	Acre	54th to 55th
Jorge Reis da Costa Nasser	Goiás	56th to present
Jorginho dos Santos Mello	Santa Catarina	56th to present
Josaphat Ramos Marinho	Bahia	49th to 50th
José Afonso Sancho	Ceará	48th
José Agripino Maia	Rio Grande do Norte	48th to 55th
José Alberto Fogaça de Medeiros	Rio Grande do Sul	48th to 51st
José Alencar Gomes da Silva	Minas Gerais	51st to 52nd
José Almeida Lima	Sergipe	52nd to 53rd
José Alves do Nascimento	Sergipe	49th to 50th
José Amauri Pereira de Araújo	Piauí	55th
José Antônio Machado Reguffe	Distrito Federal	55th to present
José Antonio Medeiros	Mato Grosso	55th
José Antônio Totó Aires Cavalcante	Tocantins	50th
José Barroso Pimentel	Ceará	54th to 55th
José Bernardo Cabral	Amazonas	50th to 51st
José Bonifácio Gomes de Sousa	Tocantins	50th
José Carlos da Silva Júnior	Paraíba	50th to 50th
José Carlos Gomes Carvalho	Paraná	48th
José da Cruz Marinho	Pará	56th to present
José de Abreu Bianco	Rondônia	50th to 51st
José do Nascimento Caixeta	Goiás	46th to 48th
José Eduardo de Andrade Vieira	Paraná	49th to 50th
José Eduardo de Barros Dutra	Sergipe	50th to 51st
José Eduardo Siqueira Campos	Tocantins	51st to 52nd
José Givago Raposo Tenório	Alagoas	55th
José Henrique Carneiro de Loyola	Santa Catarina	50th to 51st
José Ignácio Ferreira	Espírito Santo	47th to 51st
José Jefferson Carpinteiro Peres	Amazonas	50th to 52nd
José Jorge de Vasconcelos Lima	Pernambuco	51st to 53rd
José Márcio Panoff de Lacerda	Mato Grosso	48th to 49th
José Nery Azevedo	Pará	53rd
José Paulo Bisol	Rio Grande do Sul	48th to 49th
José Pedro Gonçalves Taques	Mato Grosso do Sul	54th to 55th
José Pedro Rodrigues Gonçalves	Mato Grosso	49th
José Perrella de Oliveira Costa	Mato Grosso	54th to 55th
José Reginaldo Duarte	Ceará	50th to 50th
José Renan Vasconcelos Calheiros	Alagoas	50th to present
José Renato Casagrande	Espírito Santo	53rd
José Ribamar Noleto de Santana	Piauí	55th
José Richa	Paraná	46th to 49th
José Roberto Arruda	Distrito Federal	50th to 51st
José Ronaldo Aragão	Rondônia	48th to 49th
José Saad	Goiás	50th
José Sarney de Araújo Costa	Amapá	49th to present
José Sérgio de Oliveira Machado	Ceará	50th to 51st
José Serra	São Paulo	50th to 51st; 55th to present
José Targino Maranhão	Paraíba	55th to present
José Wellington Barroso de Araújo Dias	Piauí	54th to 55th
José Wellington Roberto	Paraíba	50th to 51st
Júlio Eduardo Gomes Pereira	Acre	50th to 51st
Júlio José de Campos	Mato Grosso	49th to 50th
Júnia Marise Azeredo Coutinho	Minas Gerais	49th to 50th
Jutahy Borges Magalhães	Bahia	48th to 49th
Juvêncio Antônio Vergolino Dias	Pará	50th
Juvêncio César da Fonseca	Mato Grosso do Sul	51st to 52nd
Kátia Regina de Abreu	Tocantins	52nd to present
Lasier Costa Martins	Rio Grande do Sul	55th to present
Lauro Álvares da Silva Campos	Distrito Federal	50th to 51st
Lavoisier Maia Sobrinho	Rio Grande do Norte	48th to 49th
Leila Gomes de Barros	Distrito Federal	56th to present
Leomar de Melo Quintanilha	Tocantins	50th to 52nd
Leonel Arcângelo Pavan	Santa Catarina	52nd
Leopoldo Peres Sobrinho	Amazonas	48th
Levy Dias	Mato Grosso do Sul	49th to 50th
Lídice da Mata e Sousa	Bahia	54th to 55th
Louremberg Ribeiro Nunes Rocha	Mato Grosso	48th to 50th
Lourival Baptista	Sergipe	48th to 49th
Lúcia Vânia Abrão Costa	Goiás	52nd to 55th
Lucídio Portela Nunes	Piauí	49th to 50th
Lúcio Gonçalo de Alcântara	Ceará	50th to 51st
Lúdio Martins Coelho	Mato Grosso do Sul	50th to 51st
Luís Alberto Maguito Vilela	Goiás	51st to 52nd
Luís Alberto Martins de Oliveira	Paraná	49th to 50th
Luís Carlos Bello Parga	Maranhão	49th to 51st
Luis Carlos Heinze	Rio Grande do Sul	56th to present
Luis Eduardo Granjeiro Girão	Ceará	56th to present
Luís Estêvão de Oliveira Neto	Distrito Federal	51st to 52nd
Luís Osvaldo Pastore	Espírito Santo	50th to 51st
Luís Piauilino de Melo Monteiro	Pernambuco	48th
Luís Viana Filho	Bahia	47th to 48th
Luís Viana Neto	Bahia	48th
Luiz Alberto Vidal Pontes	Ceará	51st to 52nd
Luiz Cantuária Barreto	Amapá	56th to present
Luiz Carlos do Carmo	Goiás	55th to present
Luiz Henrique da Silveira	Santa Catarina	54th to 55th
Luiz Lindbergh Farias Filho	Rio de Janeiro	54th to 55th
Luiz Otávio Oliveira Campos	Pará	51st to 52nd
Luzia Alves Toledo	Espírito Santo	50th to 51st
Magno Pereira Malta	Espírito Santo	52nd to 55th
Mailza Assis da Silva	Acre	55th to present
Manoel Antônio Rodrigues Palma	Mato Grosso	55th
Mara Cristina Gabrilli	São Paulo	56th to present
Marcelo Bezerra Crivella	Rio de Janeiro	52nd to 55th
Marcelo Costa e Castro	Piauí	56th to present
Marcelo Miranda Soares	Mato Grosso do Sul	47th to 48th
Márcio Luís Berezoski	Santa Catarina	48th
Márcio Miguel Bittar	Acre	56th to present
Marco Antônio de Oliveira Maciel	Pernambuco	47th to 50th; 52nd to 53rd
Marco Lúcio	Mato Grosso	50th to 51st
Marcondes Iran Benevides Gadelha	Paraíba	47th to 48th
Marconi Ferreira Perillo Júnior	Goiás	53rd
Marcos de Meira Lins	Pernambuco	50th to 51st
Marcos Guerra	Espírito Santo	52nd
Marcos Ribeiro de Mendonça	São Paulo	48th
Marcos Ribeiro do Val	Espírito Santo	56th to present
Marcos Rogério da Silva Brito	Rondônia	56th to present
Maria Alacoque Bezerra de Figueiredo	Ceará	48th
Maria Benigna Oliveira do Nascimento Jucá	Amapá	50th to 51st
Maria do Carmo do Nascimento Alves	Sergipe	51st to present
Maria de Fátima Bezerra	Rio Grande do Norte	53rd
Maria Marluce Moreira Pinto	Roraima	49th to 51st
Maria Osmarina Marina Silva de Sousa Vaz de Lima	Acre	50th to 51st; 53rd
Maria Regina Sousa	Piauí	55th
Mário Couto Filho	Pará	53rd to 54th
Mário Covas Júnior	São Paulo	48th to 49th
Mário Maia	Acre	47th to 48th
Marisa Joaquina Monteiro Serrano	Mato Grosso do Sul	53rd
Marta Teresa Smith de Vasconcelos Suplicy	São Paulo	54th to 55th
Matusalém Gonçalves Fernandes	Rondônia	50th to 51st
Maurício Brasilino Leite	Paraíba	47th to 48th
Maurício José Corrêa	Distrito Federal	48th to 49th
Mauro Borges Teixeira	Goiás	47th to 48th
Mauro de Alencar Fecury	Maranhão	53rd
Mauro Fecury	Maranhão	52nd
Mauro Miranda Soares	Goiás	50th to 51st
Max Lânio Gonzaga Jaime	Goiás	48th
Moisés Abraão Neto	Tocantins	48th to 49th
Nabor Teles da Rocha Júnior	Acre	48th to 51st
Nelson de Sousa Carneiro	Rio de Janeiro	48th to 49th
Nelson Trad Filho	Mato Grosso do Sul	56th to present
Nelson Wedekin	Santa Catarina	48th to 49th
Neuto Fausto de Conto	Santa Catarina	53rd
Ney de Albuquerque Maranhão	Pernambuco	48th to 49th
Ney Robinson Suassuna	Paraíba	49th to 52nd
Nivaldo Rodrigues Machado	Pernambuco	47th to 48th
Odacir Soares Rodrigues	Rondônia	47th to 50th
Olavo Gomes Pires Filho	Rondônia	48th
Omar José Abdel Aziz	Amazonas	55th to present
Onofre Quinan	Goiás	49th to 50th
Oriovisto Guimarães	Paraná	56th to present
Osmar Fernandes Dias	Paraná	50th to 53rd
Otoniel Machado Carneiro	Goiás	50th
Otto Roberto Mendonça de Alencar	Bahia	55th to present
Oziel Rodrigues Carneiro	Pará	48th to 49th
Patrícia Lúcia Sabóia Ferreira Gomes	Ceará	52nd to 53rd
Paulo César Hartung Gomes	Espírito Santo	51st to 52nd
Paulo Fernando Batista Guerra	Amapá	50th to 50th
Paulo Ganem Souto	Bahia	51st to 52nd
Paulo Octávio Alves Pereira	Distrito Federal	52nd to 53rd
Paulo Renato Paim	Rio Grande do Sul	52nd to present
Paulo Roberto Bauer	Santa Catarina	54th to 55th
Paulo Roberto Davim	Rio Grande do Norte	54th
Paulo Roberto Galvão da Rocha	Pará	55th to present
Pedro Chaves dos Santos Filho	Mato Grosso do Sul	55th
Pedro Franco Piva	São Paulo	50th to 51st
Pedro Henrique Teixeira	Distrito Federal	49th to 50th
Pedro Jorge Simon	Rio Grande do Sul	49th to 54th
Pedro Mansueto de Lavor	Pernambuco	48th to 49th
Pedro Ubirajara de Oliveira	Mato Grosso do Sul	50th to 51st
Plínio Valério	Amazonas	56th to present
Rachid Saldanha Derzi	Mato Grosso do Sul	48th to 49th
Raimundo Lira	Paraíba	48th to 49th; 55th
Ramez Tebet	Mato Grosso do Sul	50th to 52nd
Randolph Frederich Rodrigues Alves	Amapá	54th to present
Regina Maria d'Assumpção	Minas Gerais	50th to 50th
Regis Velasco Fichtner Pereira	Rio de Janeiro	53rd
Renato Casagrande	Espírito Santo	53rd
Renilde Silva Bulhões Barros	Alagoas	56th to present
Ricardo de Rezende Ferraço	Espírito Santo	54th to 55th
Ricardo Ferreira Santos	Espírito Santo	50th to 51st
Roberto Cavalcanti Ribeiro	Paraíba	52nd to 53rd
Roberto Coelho Rocha	Maranhão	55th to present
Roberto de Oliveira Campos	Mato Grosso	47th to 48th
Roberto de Oliveira Muniz	Bahia	55th
Roberto João Pereira Freire	Pernambuco	50th to 51st
Roberto Pompeu de Sousa Brasil	Distrito Federal	48th to 49th
Roberto Requião de Melo e Silva	Paraná	50th to 51st; 54th to 55th
Roberto Saturnino Braga	Rio de Janeiro	51st to 52nd
Rodolfo Tourinho Neto	Bahia	51st to 52nd
Rodrigo Otavio Soares Pacheco	Minas Gerais	56th to present
Rodrigo Santos Cunha	Alagoas	56th to present
Rodrigo Sobral Rollemberg	Distrito Federal	54th to 55th
Rogério Carvalho Santos	Sergipe	56th to present
Romário de Souza Faria	Rio de Janeiro	55th to present
Romero Jucá Filho	Roraima	50th to 55th
Romeu Tuma	São Paulo	50th to 53rd
Ronaldo José da Cunha Lima	Paraíba	50th to 51st
Ronan Tito de Almeida	Minas Gerais	48th to 49th
Rosalba Ciarlini Rosado	Rio Grande do Norte	53rd
Roseana Sarney Murad	Maranhão	52nd
Rosilda de Freitas	Espírito Santo	55th to present
Ruben Figueiró de Oliveira	Minas Gerais	54th
Rubens Moreira Mendes Filho	Rondônia	50th to 51st
Rubens Vilar de Carvalho	Alagoas	48th to 48th
Sandra Zanatta Guidi	Santa Catarina	50th
Sebastião Afonso Viana Macedo Neves	Acre	51st to 53rd
Sebastião Ferreira da Rocha	Amapá	50th to 51st
Sebastião Machado Oliveira	Acre	52nd
Selma Rosane Santos Arruda	Mato Grosso	56th to present
Sérgio de Oliveira Cabral Santos Filho	Rio de Janeiro	52nd
Sérgio de Oliveira Cunha	Acre	54th to present
Sérgio Olímpio Gomes	São Paulo	56th
Sérgio Pedro Zambiasi	Rio Grande do Sul	52nd to 53rd
Serys Marly Slhessarenko	Mato Grosso	52nd to 53rd
Severino Sérgio Estelita Guerra	Pernambuco	52nd to 53rd
Severo Fagundes Gomes	São Paulo	47th to 48th
Sílvio Name	Paraná	48th
Simone Nassar Tebet	Mato Grosso do Sul	55th to present
Soraya Vieira Thronicke	Mato Grosso do Sul	56th to present
Tasso Ribeiro Jereissati	Ceará	52nd to 53rd; 55th to present
Telmário Mota de Oliveira	Roraima	55th to present
Telmo Camilo Vieira	Acre	49th
Teotônio Brandão Vilela Filho	Alagoas	48th to 52nd
Valdir Raupp de Matos	Rondônia	52nd to 55th
Valmir Antônio Amaral	Distrito Federal	51st to 52nd
Valter Pereira de Oliveira	Mato Grosso do Sul	53rd
Vanderlan Vieira Cardoso	Goiás	56th to present
Vanessa Grazziotin	Amazonas	54th to 55th
Veneziano Vital do Rêgo	Paraíba	56th to present
Vicente Alves de Oliveira	Tocantins	53rd to 55th
Vilson Pedro Kleinübing	Santa Catarina	50th to 51st
Virgílio de Morais Fernandes Távora	Ceará	47th to 48th
Vital do Rêgo Filho	Paraíba	55th
Waldeck Vieira Ornelas	Bahia	50th to 51st
Waldemir Moka Miranda de Britto	Minas Gerais	54th to 55th
Walter de Freitas Pinheiro	Bahia	54th to 55th
Wellington Antônio Fagundes	Mato Grosso	55th to present
Wellington Salgado de Oliveira	Minas Gerais	52nd
Weverton Rocha	Maranhão	56th to present
Wilder Pedro de Morais	Goiás	54th to 55th
Wilson Barbosa Martins	Mato Grosso do Sul	48th to 49th
Zanete Ferreira Cardinal	Mato Grosso	49th to 50th
Zenaide Maia Calado Pereira dos Santos	Rio Grande do Norte	56th to present
