= List of Senators of the First Brazilian Senate =

The First Brazilian Senate met on 6 May 1826, at noon, where 31 senators witnessed the creation of the House. Of the 50 senators with life tenure chosen by the 19 provinces and the Emperor, nine were judges, seven came from the Church, four from the Army, in addition to two doctors, one lawyer and four landowners. Almost half (23) would be raised to life peerage over time as barons, viscounts and marquises.

At that time, seats were distributed proportionally to the population of each province.

== Senators ==
I — Province of Pará

- José Joaquim Nabuco de Araújo (later Baron of Itapoã)

II — Província of Maranhão

- João Inácio da Cunha (later Baron and Viscount of Alcântara)
- Patrício José de Almeida e Silva, lawyer

III — Province of Piauí

- Luís José de Oliveira Mendes (later Baron of Monte Santo)

IV — Province of Ceará

- João Antônio Rodrigues de Carvalho, magistrate
- Domingos da Mota Teixeira, ecclesiastic
- Pedro José da Costa Barros, senior Army officer
- João Carlos Augusto de Oyenhausen-Gravenburg (later Viscount and Marquis of Aracati)

V — Province of Rio Grande do Norte

- Afonso de Albuquerque Maranhão, landowner

VI — Province of Paraíba do Norte

- Estêvão José Carneiro da Cunha, Army officer
- João Severiano Maciel da Costa (later Viscount and Marquis of Queluz)

VII — Province of Pernambuco

- José Carlos Mayrink da Silva Ferrão, landowner
- Antônio José Duarte de Araújo Gondim, magistrate
- Bento Barroso Pereira, brigadier
- José Inácio Borges, brigadier
- José Joaquim de Carvalho, doctor
- Antônio Luís Pereira da Cunha (later Viscount and Marquis of Caravelas)

VIII — Province of Alagoas

- Nuno Eugênio Lóssio e Seiblitz, magistrate
- Felisberto Caldeira Brant Pontes (later Viscount and Marquis of Barbacena)

IX — Province of Bahia

- Francisco Carneiro de Campos, magistrate
- José Joaquim Carneiro de Campos (later Viscount and Marquis of Caravelas)
- Luís José de Carvalho e Melo (later Viscount of Cachoeira)
- José da Silva Lisboa (later Baron and Viscount of Cairu)
- Domingos Borges de Barros (later Baron and Viscount of Pedra Branca)
- Clemente Ferreira França (later Viscount and Marquis of Nazaré)

X — Province of Sergipe

- José Teixeira da Mata Bacelar, magistrate

XI — Province of Espírito Santo

- Francisco dos Santos Pinto, ecclesiastic

XII — Province of Minas Gerais

- Manuel Ferreira from Câmara Bittencourt Aguiar e Sá, landowner
- José Teixeira da Fonseca Vasconcelos (later Baron and Viscount Caeté)
- Estêvão Ribeiro de Resende (later Baron, Count and Marquis of Valença)
- Manuel Jacinto Nogueira da Gama (later Baron and Marquis of Baependi)
- João Gomes da Silveira Mendonça (later Viscount of Fanado and Marquis of Sabará)
- João Evangelista de Faria Lobato, magistrate
- Antônio Gonçalves Gomide, doctor
- Jacinto Furtado de Mendonça, owner
- Marcos Antônio Monteiro de Barros, ecclesiastic
- Sebastião Luiz Tinoco da Silva, magistrate

XIII — Province of São Paulo

- Lucas Antônio Monteiro de Barros (later Baron and Viscount of Congonhas do Campo)
- Francisco de Assis Mascarenhas (later Count and Marquis of São João da Palma)
- Nuno Eugênio Lóssio e Seiblitz, magistrate
- João Ferreira de Oliveira Bueno, ecclesiastic

XIV — Province of Rio de Janeiro

- Mariano José Pereira da Fonseca (later Viscount and Marquês de Maricá)
- Francisco Vilela Barbosa (later Viscount and Marquis of Paranaguá)
- José Egídio Álvares de Almeida (later Baron, Viscount and Marquis of Santo Amaro)
- José Caetano Ferreira de Aguiar, ecclesiastic

XV — Province of Santa Catarina

- Lourenço Rodrigues de Andrade, ecclesiastic

XVI —Province of São Pedro do Rio Grande do Sul

- Luís Correia Teixeira de Bragança, magistrate

XVII — Province of Mato Grosso

- Caetano Pinto de Miranda Montenegro (later Viscount and Marquis of Praia Grande)

XVIII — Province of Goiás

- Francisco Maria Gordilho Veloso de Barbuda (later Baron of Pati do Alferes, Viscount of Lorena and Marquis of Jacarepaguá)

XIX — Província Cisplatina

- D. Dámaso Antonio Larrañaga, ecclesiastic
