= Barbalho =

Barbalho is a surname. Notable people with the surname include:

- Álvaro Barbalho Uchôa Cavalcanti (1818–1889), Brazilian judge and politician
- Elcione Zahluth Barbalho (born 1944), Brazilian pedagogue and politician
- Helder Barbalho (born 1979), Brazilian administrator, politician, the current governor of the state of Pará
- Jader Barbalho (born 1944), Brazilian politician, businessman and landowner from the state of Pará
