= Antônio Lomanto Júnior =

Brazilian politician

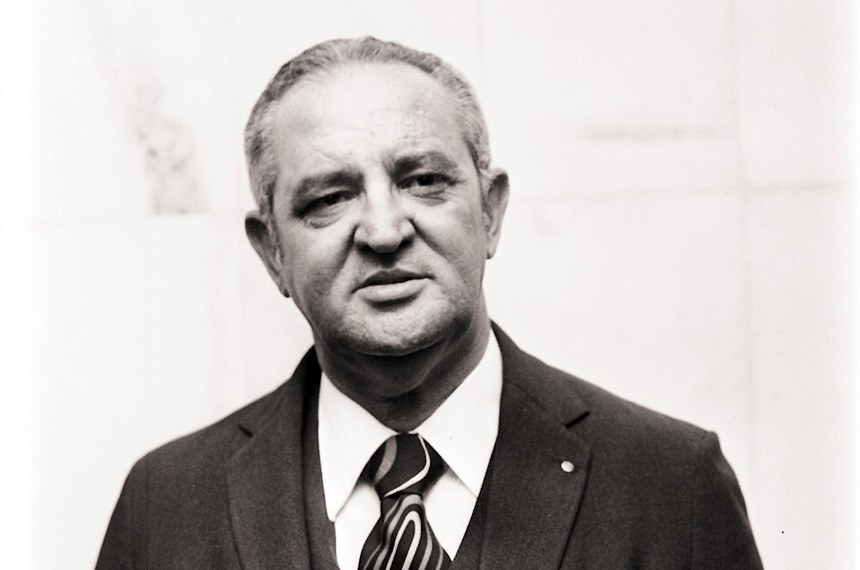

Governor of Bahia
- In office April 7, 1963 – March 15, 1967
- Preceded by: Juracy Magalhães
- Succeeded by: Luís Viana Filho

Personal details
- Born: November 29, 1924; Jequié, Bahia, Brazil
- Died: November 23, 2015 (aged 90); Salvador, Bahia
- Spouse: Hildete
- Children: 5
- Relatives: Leur Lomanto Júnior (grandson)
- Occupation: Politician

Antônio Lomanto Júnior, widely known as Lomanto Júnior, (November 29, 1924 – November 23, 2015) was a Brazilian politician. He served as the Governor of Bahia from 1963 to 1967, becoming the youngest governor in Bahia's history, as well as a Senator in the federal Chamber of Deputies, representing the state of Bahia, from 1979 until 1987. He was also mayor of the city of Jequié for several nonconsecutive tenures in office.

Lomanto was born in Jequié, Bahia, on November 29, 1924. He began his political career as a Jequié alderman from 1947 to 1951. He then served as the mayor of Jequié from 1951 to 1955 and again from 1959 to 1963. In between, Lomanto was elected to the state Legislative Assembly of Bahia from 1955 until 1959.

In 1962, Lomanto was elected Governor of Bahia. He was inaugurated on April 7, 1963, at the age of 37, becoming the youngest elected Governor of Bahia in the state's history. He served as governor until 1967. During his tenure, Lomanto oversaw the construction of several major roads and highways, including BR-101, which integrated southern Bahia with the rest of the state, as well as the installation of electricity throughout the entire state for the first time. He also rebuilt the Teatro Castro Alves, a cultural center in Salvador, and constructed the Avenida do Contorno in the state capital. His other major infrastructure projects included the Ponte do Pontal bridge over the Baía do Pontal in Ilhéus.

He later served as a Senator in the federal Chamber of Deputies of Brazil from 1979 to 1987. Lomanto once again returned as Mayor of Jequié from 1993 to 1997, his last political office before his retirement from politics.

Lomanto Júnior died from multiple organ failure and kidney failure at the Hospital Português in Salvador, Bahia, on November 23, 2015, at the age of 90. He had been hospitalized since October 4, 2015, as his health deteriorated. Lomanto was survived by his wife, Hildete; five children - Lomanto, Leur, Lilian, Tadeu and Marco Antonio; ten grandchildren, and ten great-grandchildren. They include his son, Leur Lomanto, a seven-term member of the federal Chamber of Deputies, and his grandson, Leur Lomanto Júnior, a member of the Legislative Assembly of Bahia.

Lomanto's public viewing was held at the Palácio da Aclamação in Salvador on November 24. His funeral was held at the Cathedral of St. Anthony (Catedral de Santo Antônio) in Jequié on November 25, 2015. He was buried in the Cemitério São João Batista, also in Jequié.
