= Luís Viana =

Brazilian politician

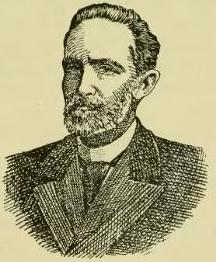
- Luís Viana

Provincial Deputy for Bahia
- In office 1872–1875

Senator for Bahia
- In office 1891–1896

Senator for Bahia
- In office 1912–1920

9th Governor of Bahia
- In office 1896–1900
- Preceded by: Rodrigues Lima
- Succeeded by: Severino Vieira

Personal details
- Born: 30 November 1846 Casa Nova, Brazil
- Died: 6 July 1920 (aged 73) Atlantic Ocean
- Spouse: Joana Gertrudes Viana
- Children: Luís Viana Filho; Luís Viana Neto (Grandson)
- Parent: Mother: Inês Ribeiro Viana Father: José Manuel Viana
- Profession: Politician and magistrate

Luís Viana (Note: Luiz Vianna, in the old spelling.) (30 November 1846 – 6 July 1920) was a Brazilian politician and magistrate.
