= Antônio de Barros Carvalho =

Brazilian politician (1899–1966)

Antônio de Barros Carvalho, better known as Barros Carvalho (Palmares, February 18, 1899 – Recife, September 3, 1966) was a landowner and Brazilian politician. He was congressman and senator for the state of Pernambuco.

== Early years ==
The son of José de Carvalho and Albuquerque and Francisca de Barros Carvalho, he graduated from the Faculty of Pharmacy and Dentistry of Recife, but at an early stage, became interested in economic and financial issues and taxation, an area in which he specialised.

A landowner in Palmares, he was an Inspector of consumption tax in Pernambuco, Rio Grande do Sul, Minas Gerais, São Paulo and Rio de Janeiro and later a Superintendent Inspector of federal taxation.

He served as technical advisor to the Minister of Finance Artur de Sousa Costa, between 1934 and 1945, having developed several projects, such as the Land Law and laws on income tax, sales tax and consignments.

During the Dictatorship of Getúlio Vargas (1937–1945), he served as editor of the daily newspaper Diário de Pernambuco and directed the Jornal Pequeno. At a later stage, he contributed as a journalist to the daily newspapers Estado de Minas and Diário de São Paulo.

== Political career ==
After joining the UDN, he was elected first substitute federal deputy for Pernambuco in December 1945, occupying a seat in the Chamber of Deputies between December 1945 and December 1947.

In 1950, he was elected federal deputy for the UDN – PTB – PR – PRP – PL coalition.

Due to his great prestige among workers, he was invited by Getúlio Vargas to join the PTB. Accepting the invitation, he was re-elected by his new party, the PTB-PST coalition, in 1954.

In October 1958, he was elected Senator and simultaneously re-elected as a Federal Deputy, opting for the position of Senator.

In 1960, he was appointed Minister of Agriculture by President Juscelino Kubitschek, staying in office until the end of the latter’s term in January 1961.

He accompanied Vice-President João Goulart on his visit to China in August 1961, when President Jânio Quadros resigned. He remained with the Vice-President in Paris, while the presidential crisis unfolded, returning to Brazil with him via Rio Grande do Sul in September, with the support of then State Governor Brizola, who led the Legalidade [Legality] campaign.

He opposed the Additional Act No. 4 of 2 September 2, 1961, which established a parliamentary regime within Brazil, but supported the act as a way of permitting João Goulart to take power. He then defended then the anticipation of the referendum on the system of government, which was eventually approved in September 1962, with the referendum finally held on 6 January 1963, at which point, the population decided to return to the presidential system.

He was leader of the PTB in the Senate from 1962 to 1965 and leader of the majority coalition (PSD and PTB) in 1963 and 1964.

He was the uncle of Marcos Freire, who was Senator for Pernambuco between 1975 and 1983, Chairman of the Caixa Economica Federal [Federal Savings Bank] and Minister of Agrarian Reform, as well as the great-uncle of Luis Freire, who was Federal Deputy for Pernambuco in 1987 to 1988 and mayor of Olinda from 1989 to 1992.
