= Leur Lomanto Júnior =

Brazilian politician (born 1976)

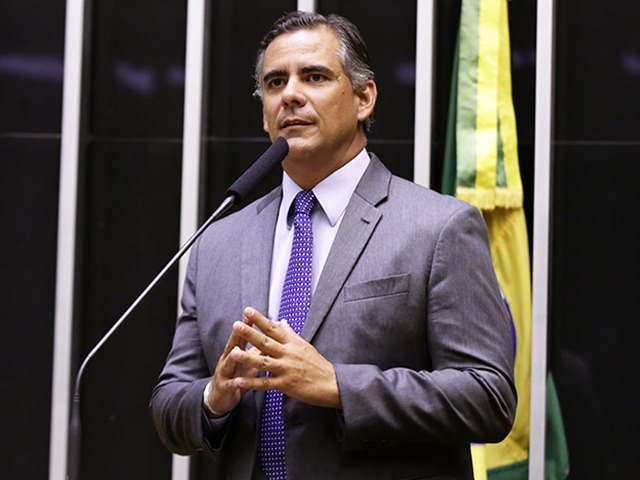
- Lomanto in 2019

Member of the Chamber of Deputies
- Incumbent
- Assumed office 1 February 2019
- Constituency: Bahia

Member of the Legislative Assembly of Bahia
- In office 1 February 2007 – 1 February 2019
- Constituency: At-large

Personal details
- Born: Leur Antonio de Britto Lomanto Júnior; 28 October 1976 (age 50) Salvador, Bahia, Brazil
- Party: UNIÃO (since 2022)
- Other political affiliations: MDB (2001–2018); DEM (2018–2022)
- Relatives: Antônio Lomanto Júnior (grandfather)

Leur Antonio de Britto Lomanto Júnior (born 28 October 1976) is a Brazilian politician serving as a member of the Chamber of Deputies since 2019. From 2007 to 2019, he was a member of the Legislative Assembly of Bahia. He is the son of Leur Lomanto and the grandson of Antônio Lomanto Júnior.
