= Ângelo Carlos Muniz =

Brazilian politician

Senator of the Empire of Brazil
- In office 1852 – 4 May 1863
- Monarch: Pedro II

Personal details
- Born: 1 January 1798; Pará state, Brazil
- Died: 4 May 1863 (aged 65)
- Political party: Conservative Party
- Occupation: Politician

Ângelo Carlos Muniz (1 January 1798 – 4 May 1863) was a Brazilian politician who served as a senator in the Empire of Brazil from 1852 until his death. Prior to that, he was Governor of Maranhão for three non-consecutive terms.
