= Vitorino de Brito Freire =

Brazilian politician (1908–1977)

Vitorino de Brito Freire (28 November 1908 – 27 August 1977) was a Brazilian politician and congressman.

Vitorino was born in the municipality of Pedra, Pernambuco, the son of rural landowner. While he was staying in Recife to attend college, he sided with the rebels who overthrew president Washington Luís during the Revolution of 1930. His support earned him the gratitude of the newly installed president Getúlio Vargas, who gave him an office in the government of Maranhão in 1933.

From 1947 to 1971, he served as senator for the state of Maranhão, where he had helped to found the PSD (Social Democratic Party).
