= Luís Viana Filho =

Brazilian politician

Federal deputy for Bahia
- In office 1935–1967

Minister of the Civil House of Brazil
- In office 1964–1967
- President: Castelo Branco
- Preceded by: Getúlio Barbosa de Moura
- Succeeded by: Luís Augusto Fraga Navarro de Brito

Minister of Justice and Internal Affairs
- In office 1965–1965
- President: Castelo Branco
- Preceded by: Milton Campos
- Succeeded by: Juracy Magalhães

Minister of Interior Affairs of Brazil
- In office 1966–1966
- President: Castelo Branco
- Preceded by: Mem de Azambuja Sá
- Succeeded by: Carlos Medeiros Silva

36th governor of Bahia
- In office 1967–1971
- Preceded by: Junior Lomanto
- Succeeded by: Antônio Carlos Magalhães

President of the Federal Senate of Brazil
- In office 1979–1981
- President: João Figueiredo
- Preceded by: Petrônio Portella
- Succeeded by: Jarbas Passarinho

Senator from Bahia
- In office 1975–1990
- Preceded by: Aluísio Lopes de Carvalho Filho
- Succeeded by: Luís Viana Neto

Personal details
- Born: 28 March 1908 Paris, France
- Died: 5 June 1990 (aged 82) São Paulo, Brazil
- Spouse: Julieta Pontes Viana
- Children: Luís Viana Neto
- Parent(s): Joana Gertrudes Viana (mother); Luís Viana (father)
- Profession: Lawyer, teacher, historian, politician

Luís Viana Filho (old spelling Luiz Vianna Filho) (28 March 1908 – 5 June 1990) was a Brazilian lawyer, professor, historian and politician who governed the state Bahia from 1967 to 1971.

== Biography ==
Filho was born in Paris, France, and his birth certificate was registered in Salvador, Brazil. He was the son of the last governor of Bahia in the 19th century, Luís Viana. He graduated in law in 1929, but exercised the profession of journalist, corresponding to the newspapers in the Bahian capital "Diário da Bahia" and "A Tarde".

=== Political career ===
In 1934, Filho entered politics, being elected federal deputy, being removed due to the coup of the Estado Novo, which returned him to journalism. One of the founders of the PSD, he was re-elected to the same post, after the end of the Vargas Era, in 1945, in successive terms until 1966, when he became incompatible to run for the state government – in an election along the lines of the Military Regime, whose installation in the country he had supported – having been, since 1964, Extraordinary Minister for Affairs of the Civil Cabinet of the exception regime.

On 3 September 1966, he was elected, indirectly, by the Legislative Assembly, taking office the following year.

After the period of government, already by the Arena, he was elected to the Senate, where he chaired the Foreign Relations Commission and the Federal Senate itself, in the 1979–80 biennium. He died in 1990, when he was serving his second term as a senator, having also integrated the PDS and PMDB.

Filho was the only person to integrate all three Constituent Assemblies of the 20th Century (1934, 1946 and 1987–88).

=== Academic career ===
Filho became a Professor of Private International Law and History of Brazil at the Federal University of Bahia. As a historian, he published a number of books.

He was a member of the Historical and Geographic Institute of Bahia; the Academia de Letras da Bahia; meritorious member of the Brazilian Historical and Geographic Institute; corresponding member of the International Academy of Portuguese Culture, the Academy of Sciences of Lisbon and the Portuguese Academy of History.

He was elected to the Brazilian Academy of Letters on 8 April 1954, the third member of Chair 22, whose patron is José Bonifacio. He took office on 15 April of the following year, received by Menotti Del Picchia.

== Government of Bahia ==
As part of the period known as "Brazilian Miracle", marked by strong industrialization and exacerbated external indebtedness, Filho began construction of an industrial park in Bahia, in Aratu, revolving around the petrochemical industry (CIA – Centro Industrial de Aratu).

In his inaugural speech he said his government would be based on the principles of "Order, Work and Morality". It promoted some reforms in teaching, but always focused on the construction of classrooms and not on the effective preparation of the teaching profession. Since that administration, later administrations associated future declines in public education with some of these decisions.

While in office, he received a visit from Queen Elizabeth II of the United Kingdom.

== Decorations ==
- Grand Cross of the Order of Ipiranga of São Paulo;
- Grand Cross of the Military Order of Christ of Portugal (17 January 1966);
- Grand Officer of the Military Order of Torre e Espada, of Valor, Loyalty and Merit of Portugal (February 26, 1971);
- Grand Cross of the Order of Merit of Portugal (September 22, 1981);
- Grand Cross of the Order of Infante D. Henrique de Portugal (July 14, 1986);
- Grand Cross of the Order of Public Instruction of Portugal (November 26, 1987).
