= Euclides Vieira =

Brazilian politician

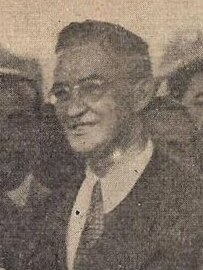
- Euclides Vieira

Senator for São Paulo
- In office 1 February 1947 – 31 January 1955

Mayor of Campinas
- In office 1 June 1945 – 10 October 1945
- Preceded by: João Alves dos Santos
- Succeeded by: Joaquim de Castro Tibiriçá
- In office 17 July 1938 – 16 July 1941
- Preceded by: Perseu Leite de Barros
- Succeeded by: Lafayette Álvaro de Sousa Camargo

Alderman of Campinas
- In office 1936–1937

Personal details
- Born: 2 May 1883 Itapira, São Paulo, Brazil
- Died: 11 September 1967 (aged 84) Campinas, São Paulo, Brazil
- Party: PSP
- Other political affiliations: PP

Euclides Vieira (2 May 1883 – 11 September 1967) was a Brazilian engineer and politician. He was mayor of Campinas and senator for São Paulo by the Social Progressive Party (PSP).
