= Afonso Arinos de Melo Franco =

Brazilian politician

In 1945.

Afonso Arinos de Melo Franco (November 27, 1905 – August 27, 1990) was a Brazilian intellectual, politician, and professor. In 1951, he authored the Afonso Arinos Law, the first against racial discrimination in Brazil. He briefly served as Minister of Foreign Affairs twice, first from January to August 1961 and again from July to December 1962, and also participated in the drafting of three different Brazilian constitutions (1946, 1967, 1988).

A prolific and versatile writer, Arinos explored multiple genres, including memoir, literary criticism, poetry, biography, and travel writing, as well as academic works on history, politics, and constitutional law. He was a member of the Brazilian Academy of Letters.

== Biography ==
=== Early life ===
Born in Belo Horizonte into a wealthy family of the Brazilian elite, he was the son of diplomat Afrânio de Melo Franco, who served as Minister of Foreign Affairs, the nephew of writer Afonso Arinos, and, through his maternal side, the grandson of the former governor of Minas Gerais Cesário Alvim.

He was sent to Rio de Janeiro to enroll at the traditional Colégio Pedro II, from which he graduated with a degree in humanities. While still a student at the National Faculty of Law, he launched his literary career with contributions to newspapers. Once graduated, he became a public prosecutor in his hometown, but soon traveled to Geneva to further his studies. After returning to Brazil, he was appointed professor of history of Brazil at the extinct University of the Federal District and later at the Rio Branco Institute. He lectured on Brazilian culture at the University of Paris and on literature at the University of Buenos Aires. In 1948, he became professor of constitutional law at his alma mater.

=== Political career ===
In 1943, Arinos signed the Manifesto of the Mineiros, an open letter to the population authored by intellectuals, politicians, and artists, which called for the country's redemocratization and the end of the Estado Novo dictatorship. He was a member of the 1946 Constituent Assembly, in which he presided the Commission of Sistematization, responsible for revising the constitutional text. In 1949, he was elected federal deputy for Minas Gerais and served until 1958. He was one of the leaders of the conservative National Democratic Union and a fierce opponent of both Getúlio Vargas and Juscelino Kubitschek. On August 9, 1954, Arinos gave a passionate speech demanding the resignation of Vargas, who two weeks later died by suicide amid a deep political crisis.

In 1958, he was elected federal deputy for the state of Rio de Janeiro (then the Federal District) and served until 1966. During his mandate, he left office to become Minister of Foreign affairs under Jânio Quadros, implementing the doctrine known as Política Externa Independente. He was the first sitting Brazilian Foreign Minister to visit Africa, where he spent time in Senegal.

As a secretary of governor Magalhães Pinto, he supported the military coup d'état which deposed president João Goulart. He served as a representative of the movement assigned with negotiating the support of the United States. Requested by Pedro Aleixo, he elaborated the chapter on individual rights and guarantees of the Constitution of 1967. As it became clear that the military regime would remain in power and that redemocratization was not among its plans, Arinos gradually distanced himself from it and later became one of its opponents.

During the redemocratization of Brazil, Arinos was appointed by president José Sarney as president of the Provisional Commission of Constitutional Studies, which became known as Commission Afonso Arinos and whose objective was to draft a basic text for the next Constitution. It included intellectuals such as Gilberto Freyre, Miguel Reale, and Jorge Amado. The resulting text, however, was not submitted to the Constitutional Assembly.

In 1986, he was elected as senator and took part of the Constitutional Assembly of the 1988 Constitution, becoming its eldest member, aged 81. On October 5, 1988, he delivered the first solemn speech at the Constitution's ceremony of promulgation.

=== Literature ===
Arinos is considered one of the major memoirists of 20th-century Brazil. In 1969, he was awarded the Prêmio Jabuti for the book Planalto, and again in 1977 for Alto-mar maralto.

He was received by Manuel Bandeira at the Brazilian Academia of Letters, where he succeeded the novelist José Lins do Rego.

== Works ==
=== History ===
- O índio brasileiro e a Revolução Francesa; as origens brasileiras da teoria da bondade natural (1937)
- Síntese da história econômica do Brasil (1938)
- Homens e temas do Brasil (1944)
- Desenvolvimento da civilização material no Brasil (1944)
- História do Banco do Brasil. Primeira fase: 1808-1835 (1944)
- História do povo brasileiro; fase nacional. 3 vols; co-written with Antonio Callado and Francisco de Assis Barbosa (1968)
- História das idéias políticas no Brasil (1972)
- Rodrigues Alves; apogeu e declínio do presidencialismo, 2 vols. (1973)

=== Law ===
- Responsabilidade criminal das pessoas jurídicas (1930)
- As leis complementares da Constituição (1948), professorial thesis
- História e teoria do partido político no Direito Constitucional brasileiro (1948), professorial thesis
- Curso de Direito Constitucional I - Teoria Geral (1958)
- Instituições políticas no Brasil e nos Estados Unidos (1974)
- Direito Constitucional II - Teoria da Constituição (1976)

=== Politics ===
- Introdução à realidade brasileira (1933)
- Preparação ao nacionalismo (1934)
- Conceito de civilização brasileira (1936)
- Parlamentarismo ou presidencialismo (1958)
- Evolução da crise brasileira (1965)
- Problemas políticos brasileiros (1976)

=== Literature ===
==== Memoir ====
- A alma do tempo (1961)
- A escalada (1965)
- Planalto (1968)
- Alto-mar maralto (1976)

==== Journals ====
- Diário de bolso seguido de retrato de noiva (1979)

==== Literary criticism ====
- Espelho de três faces (1937)
- Idéia e tempo (1939)
- Mar de sargaços (1944)
- Portulano (1945)
- O som do outro sino (1978)

=== Miscellaneous ===
- Dirceu e Marília (1937), play
- Roteiro lírico de Ouro Preto (1937), travel guide with illustrations by Pedro Nava
- Um soldado do Reino e do Império; vida do Marechal Callado (1942), biography
- Algunos aspectos de la literatura brasileña (1945), recollected lectures at the University of Buenos Aires
- Um estadista da República: Afrânio de Melo Franco e seu tempo (1955), biography
- Amor a Roma (1982), essay
