= Antônio Augusto Monteiro de Barros =

Brazilian politician

Senator of the Empire of Brazil for Minas Gerais
- In office 1828–1841
- Monarch: Pedro II

Personal details
- Born: 1790 Ponta Delgada, Azores
- Died: 16 November 1841 (aged 50 or 51) Rio de Janeiro, Brazil
- Education: University of Coimbra
- Occupation: Politician

Antônio Augusto Monteiro de Barros (1790 – 16 November 1841) was a Brazilian politician who served as a senator in the Empire of Brazil from 1828 to 1841.
