= Luís Viana Neto =

Brazilian politician (1933–2022)

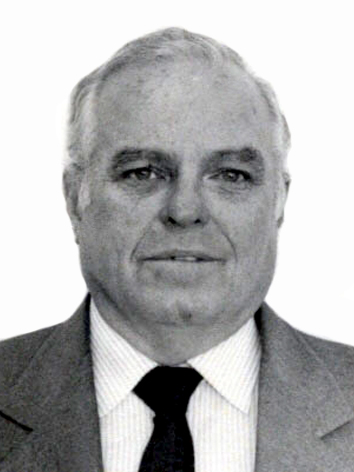

Federal Deputy for Bahia
- In office 1967–1971

Federal Deputy for Bahia
- In office 1975–1979

Federal Deputy for Bahia
- In office 1987–1990

Federal Deputy for Bahia
- In office 1991–1995

Vice Governor of Bahia
- In office 1979–1983
- Governor: Antônio Carlos Magalhães
- Preceded by: Edvaldo Correia
- Succeeded by: Edvaldo Flores

Senator of Bahia
- In office 1990–1991

Personal details
- Born: November 7, 1933 Salvador, Brazil
- Died: May 13, 2022 (aged 88) Salvador, Brazil
- Spouse: Solange Viana
- Relations: Luís Viana Filho (father)
- Profession: Lawyer, businessman

Luis Viana Neto (November 7, 1933 – May 13, 2022) was a Brazilian lawyer, businessman and politician who was a federal deputy, senator and deputy governor of Bahia.

== Biography ==
Son of Luís Viana Filho and Julieta Pontes Viana. Lawyer with a BA in law from the Federal University of Bahia in 1955 and a Doctor of Law from the University of Paris in 1957, he was a professor at the institution where he graduated. A civil construction and communications entrepreneur, he joined ARENA and was elected federal deputy in 1966; however, little exercised his mandate for having assumed the Secretariat of Municipal Affairs and Urban Services when his father ruled Bahia (1967–1971). Director of the Bank of the State of Bahia in the first government Antônio Carlos Magalhães was elected federal deputy in 1974 and was chosen vice-governor of the state when Magalhães returned to the Palace of Ondina on the recommendation of President Ernesto Geisel in 1978. With pluripartisanship restored in the João Figueiredo government, he joined the PDS and was elected alternate to his father in the elections for the Federal Senate in 1982. Before the 1986 elections he broke with his traditional allies and collaborated with the victory of Waldir Pires as governor of Bahia being that Luís Viana Neto was elected federal deputy by the PMDB. He assumed the term of senator after the death of his parent in July 1990 and that same year he was re-elected to his fourth term as federal deputy during which he migrated to the PFL. He died on May 13, 2022, at the age of 88.

== See also ==
- Luís Viana
- Luís Viana Filho
