= Pedro Chaves dos Santos =

Brazilian politician

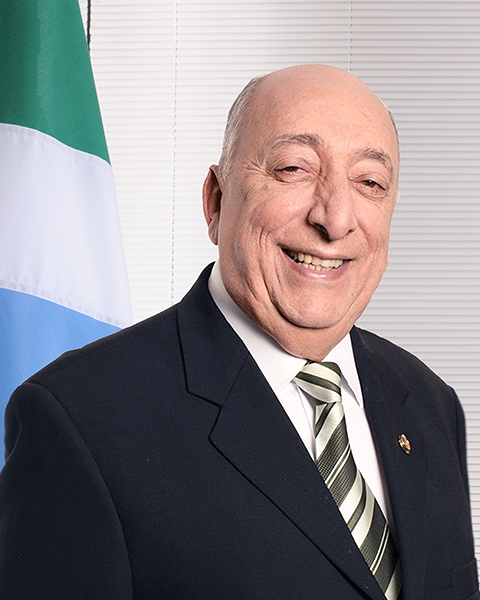

Senator from Mato Grosso do Sul
- Incumbent
- Assumed office May 17, 2016

Personal details
- Born: December 7, 1940 (age 85) Campo Grande, Mato Grosso do Sul
- Party: Social Christian Party
- Profession: Businessman

Pedro Chaves dos Santos (born December 17, 1940) is a Brazilian politician. He has represented Mato Grosso do Sul in the Federal Senate since 2016. He is a member of the Social Christian Party.
