= Jornal Pequeno =

Jornal Pequeno is a Brazilian newspaper. It is published in the Brazilian state of Maranhão and is one of the most read printed newspapers in the state. "Jornal Pequeno" means "small newspaper" in Portuguese.

== Jose Sarney and Jornal Pequeno ==
The newspaper is known in Maranhão for its conflicted relationship with the former Brazilian president Jose Sarney, in which the newspaper moved from being his supporter in 1965 to being such a fierce opposition to Sarney that its founder was called a blackmailer by the former president himself.

Sarney was also a plaintiff against Jornal Pequeno at the Brazilian Superior Court of Justice in a case of defamation, a charge that was upheld by the court in 2017, which ordered Jornal Pequeno to pay Sarney the sum of forty thousand Brazilian Reais.

Despite the acrimonious history between the two, in 2022 Sarney published a friendly article on the online edition of Jornal Pequeno discussing about his personal preference for printed newspapers instead of online media vehicles as sources of journalistic information
