= Afonso de Albuquerque Maranhão =

Brazilian politician

Senator of the Empire of Brazil
- In office 1826 – 10 July 1836
- Monarchs: Pedro I and Pedro II

Personal details
- Born: Pernambuco state, Brazil
- Died: 10 July 1836
- Occupation: Politician

Afonso de Albuquerque Maranhão (died 10 July 1836) was a politician of the Empire of Brazil. He served as governor of the states of Pernambuco and Paraiba. From 1826 until his death, he was a member of the Senate of the Empire of Brazil.
