= Álvaro Barbalho Uchôa Cavalcanti =

Brazilian judge and politician

Senator of the Empire of Brazil
- In office 4 April 1872 – 1889
- Monarch: Pedro II

Personal details
- Born: 2 April 1818 Sirinhaém, Brazil
- Died: 19 December 1889 (aged 71) Parnamirim, Brazil
- Party: Conservative Party
- Spouse: Ana Rita Maurício Vanderlei
- Occupation: Politician

Álvaro Barbalho Uchôa Cavalcanti (2 April 1818 – 19 December 1889) was a Brazilian judge and politician who served as a senator in the Empire of Brazil from 1871 to 1889.

== Biography ==
Born in Sirinhaém, Brazil, he graduated from the Faculdade de Olinda in 1838 and joined the magistracy on 26 September 1839.

A member of the Conservative Party, he alternated between being deputy in the Provincial Assembly and serving in the Chamber of Deputies. He was selected as a senator on 4 April 1872.

He was a member of the Historical and Geographical Institute of Rio de Janeiro (pt), a knight of the Order of Christ, and an official of the Order of the Rose.

He died aged 70 in his home in Parnamirim of heart damage, a month after he was dismissed from his senator position after the fall of the Brazilian empire. He was buried in the Santo Amaro Cemetery (pt) in Recife.

He was the father of Minister of the Supreme Federal Court João Barbalho Uchôa Cavalcanti (pt) and magistrate in Pernambuco Luís Barbalho Uchôa Cavalcanti.
