= Airborne leaflet propaganda =

Leaflets dropped via air during wartime

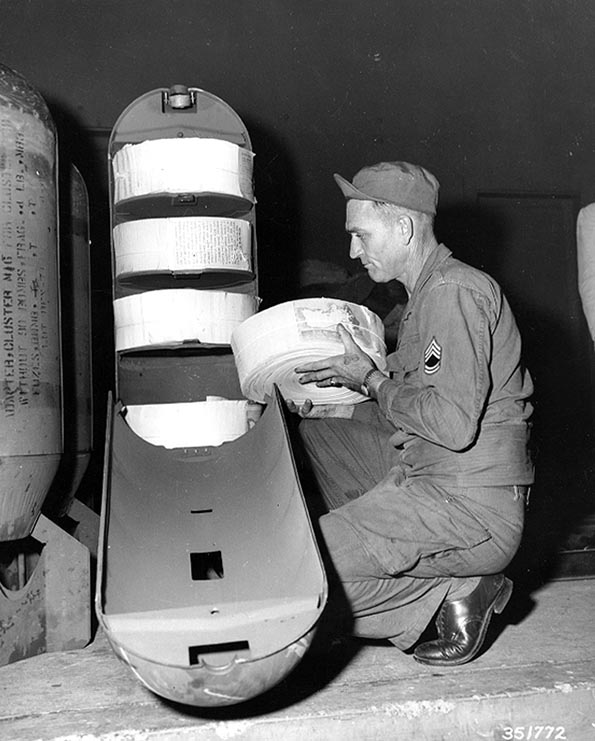
An American 500-lb M105 bomb with a M16M1 cluster adapter is loaded with leaflets during the Korean War at a US military printing plant in Japan; the container holds 22,500 leaflets

Airborne leaflet dropping is a type of propaganda where leaflets (flyers) are scattered in the air, normally by filling cluster bombs that open in midair with thousands of leaflets.

Military forces have used aircraft to drop leaflets to attempt to alter the behavior of combatants and non-combatants in enemy-controlled territory, sometimes in conjunction with air strikes. Humanitarian air missions, in cooperation with leaflet propaganda, can turn the populace against their leadership while preparing them for the arrival of enemy combatants.

Leaflet droppings have also been used to limit civilian casualties by alerting civilians of imminent danger allowing time to evacuate targeted areas.

== Objectives ==
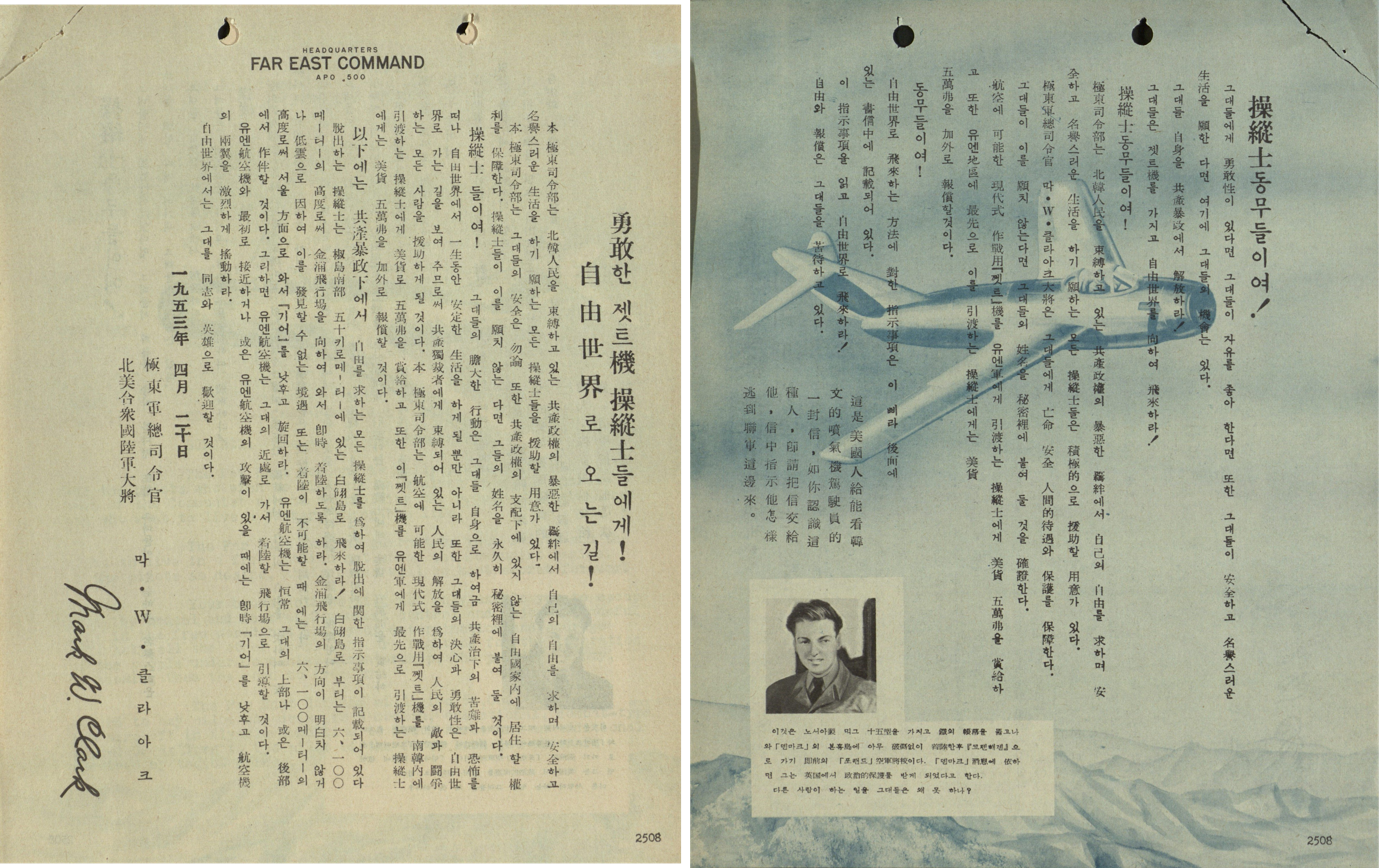
Korean War, 1953 Operation Moolah leaflet. It promises a $100,000 reward to the first North Korean pilot to deliver a Soviet MiG-15 to UN forces.

Threaten destruction
Warn enemy combatants and non-combatants that their area will be targeted. This has the dual purpose of reducing collateral damage and encouraging enemy combatants and non-combatants (who may be engaged in wartime production) to abandon their duties, reducing the target's military effectiveness.
Prompt the enemy to surrender
Explain to prospective deserters how to surrender.
Offer rewards
Rewards could be offered to encourage individuals to provide assistance, or to encourage defection.
Disseminate or counter disinformation
Reduce enemy morale through propaganda.
Neutralize enemy propaganda.
Advise radio listeners about frequencies/times of propaganda broadcasts and methods for circumventing radio jamming.
Facilitate communication
Create a friendly atmosphere for the enemy by promoting the leaflets dropper's ideologies or to convince the enemy of "noble intentions"
Provide humanitarian assistance
Inform people where to find airdropped food, how to open and consume it, and when it comes.

== History ==
=== Early use ===
Airborne leaflets have been used for military propaganda purposes at least since the 19th century. One early example is from the Franco-Prussian War when, in October 1870 during the Siege of Paris, a French balloon coming from the city dropped government proclamations over North German Confederation troops that stated the following (in German):

Paris defies the enemy. The whole of France rallies. Death to the invaders. Foolish people, shall we always throttle one another for the pleasure and proudness of Kings? Glory and conquest are crimes; defeat brings hate and desire for vengeance. Only one war is just and holy; that of independence.

Leaflet propaganda has been delivered by airplanes since the Italo-Turkish War of 1911–1912.

=== World War I ===
Aerial leaflets were first used on a large scale during World War I by all parties. The British dropped packets of leaflets over Imperial German Army trenches containing postcards from prisoners of war detailing their humane conditions, surrender notices and general propaganda against Kaiser Wilhelm II and the German generals. By the end of the war MI7b had distributed almost 26 million leaflets.

In August 1918, the famous Italian nationalist writer, poet and fighter pilot Gabriele D'Annunzio, organized the Flight over Vienna: a famous propaganda operation during the war, leading 9 Ansaldo SVA planes in a 1,100-kilometre (700 mi) round trip to drop 50,000 propaganda leaflets on the Austro-Hungarian capital.

The Germans began shooting the leaflet-dropping pilots, prompting the British to develop an alternative method of delivery. A Fleming invented the unmanned leaflet balloon in 1917, and these were used extensively in the latter part of the War, with over 48,000 units produced. The hydrogen balloon would drift over no-man's land to land in the enemy trenches.

At least one in seven of these leaflets were not handed in by the soldiers to their superiors, despite severe penalties for that offence. Even General Paul von Hindenburg admitted that "Unsuspectingly, many thousands consumed the poison" and POWs admitted to being disillusioned by the propaganda leaflets that depicted the use of German troops as mere cannon fodder. In 1915, the British began airdropping a regular leaflet newspaper Le Courrier de l'Air for civilians in German-occupied France and Belgium.

=== World War II ===
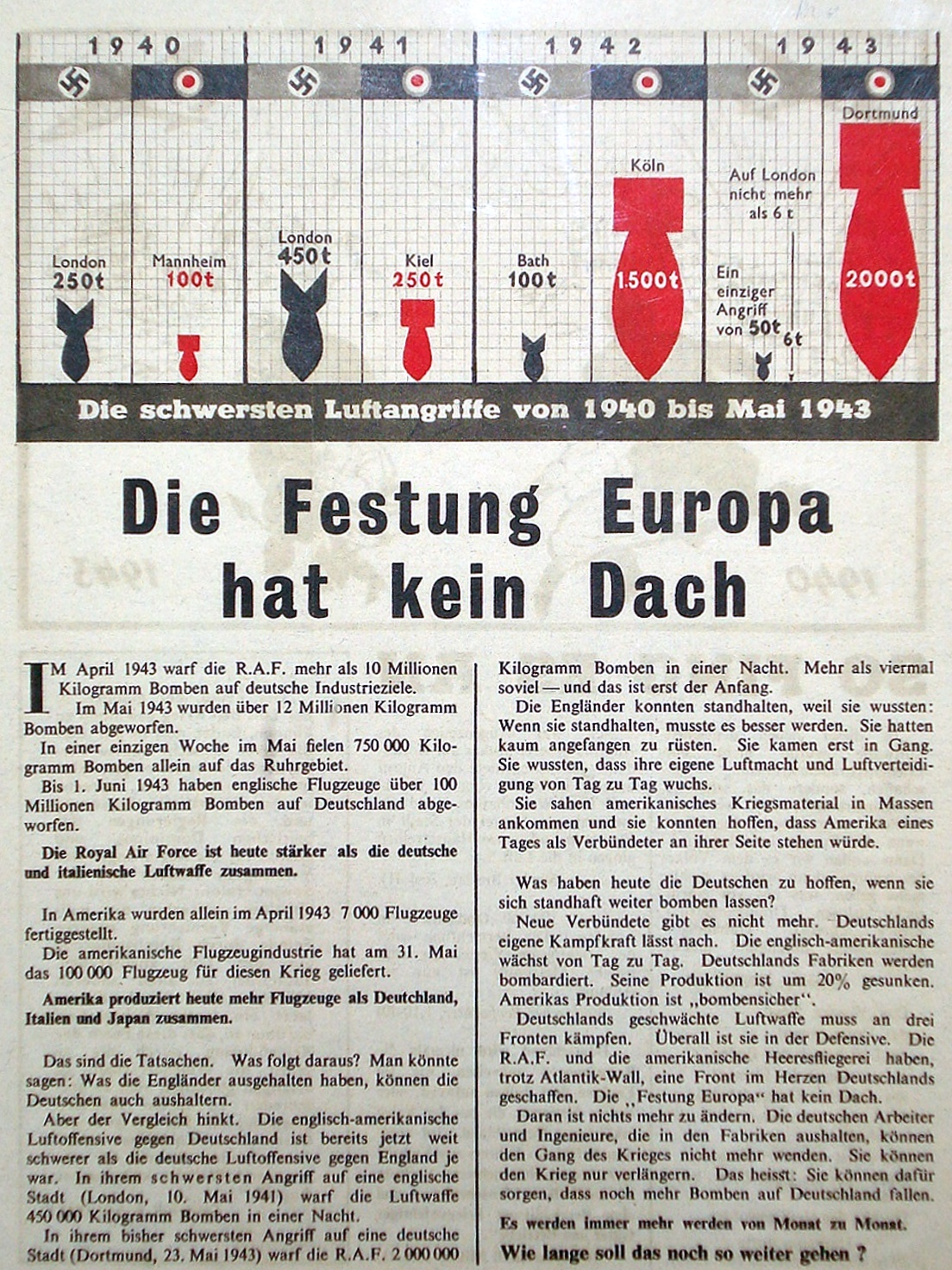
"Fortress Europe has no roof" - British propaganda leaflet dropped over Germany in 1943.

Distribution of airborne leaflet propaganda was used by both Allied and Axis forces in the Second World War, starting with a Royal Air Force leaflet drop over the port of Kiel in September 1939. During the Phoney War most of the Royal Air Force's operations consisted of airborne leaflet dropping, as the United Kingdom wanted Nazi Germany to be the first country to begin strategic bombing of civilian areas to avoid deterring neutral powers such as the United States from supporting the Allies.

The first proposal to construct a special bomb with which to disperse airborne leaflets was put forward by British air force officers during World War II. The most successful "leaflet bomb" model of the War was the Monroe bomb, invented in 1943 by USAAF Captain James Monroe of the 305th Bombardment Group. It was developed from laminated paper containers that had been used to transport M-17 incendiary bombs.

The British improved the use of hydrogen balloons to carry leaflets over German lines. Some of the V-1 flying bombs launched by the Germans against southern England carried leaflets in a cardboard tube at the tail of a missile. This would be ejected by a small gunpowder charge while the V1 was in flight.

Allied airborne leaflets printed during WWII were "factual, in the main truthful, and served (or so it was claimed) to create a reputation for reliability both in supplying information and refuting German accounts which we said to be untruthful". Often the leaflets did not reach their intended targets because they were dropped from such high altitudes and often drifted over lakes and rural areas. Furthermore, there were various elements which made dropping leaflets on targets difficult, like slow airspeed, short range, and attack by enemy.

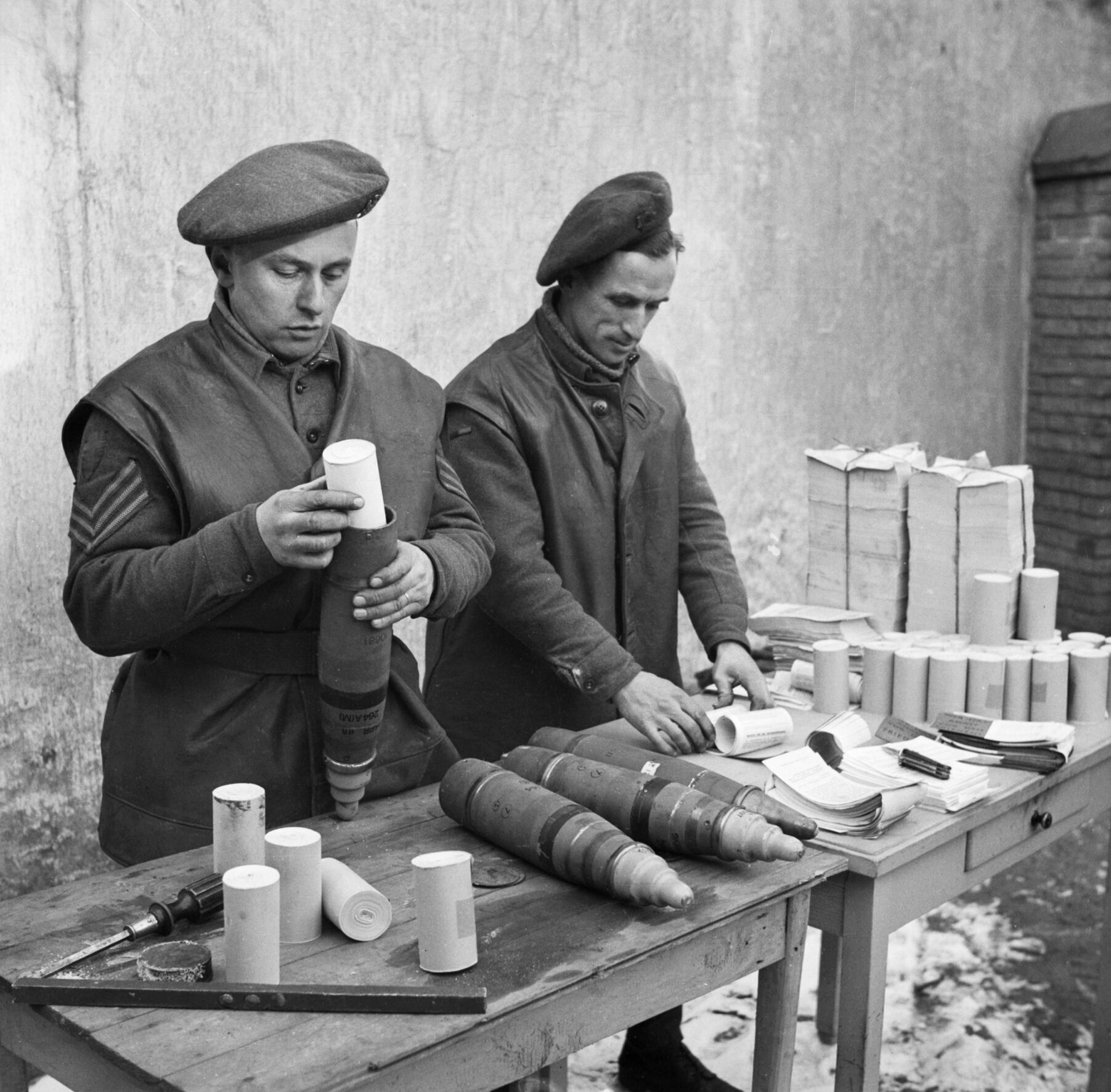
Royal Artillery gunners fill 25-pounder shells with leaflets. Roermond, The Netherlands, January 1945

Although leaflets were seen as effective in manipulating troops when morale was low, "During the early months of the war, leaflets or pamphlets were scattered over enemy territory by aircraft and balloons, but it was more than doubtful whether these had any useful effect, their obvious defects being that few can have reached their targets and, being printed, they were sometimes out of date by the time they were ready to distribute. The front-line distribution of leaflets was quite another matter and these were dropped by aircraft or fired by shells, the messages they bore being less careful about the general principles of consistency and frankness and only truthful about matters on which the enemy had contradictory information". It was found that psychological warfare was not effective when distributing surrender leaflets to an enemy which currently had a high morale amongst its troops. Despite the limitation of airborne leaflets' ineffectiveness on opposing sides with high morale, enemies used this tactic "to cause the men to begin talking to each other about their poor military position, their desire to stay alive for their families' sakes, and the reasonableness of honorable surrender", which often led men to desert. According to Noel Monks who was a correspondent for the London Daily Mail, many German soldiers caught US surrender passes which were dropped despite this being punishable by death; 75% of German people, or 11,302 out of 12,000 who had a surrender pass from the US, surrendered in fact.

One example of German propaganda leaflets which appealed to American troops was one that depicted a passionate kiss between a man and woman. The leaflet read: "FAREWELL Remember her last kiss ... ? Gee were you happy then ... ! Together, you spent marvelous times ..., lounging on beaches ..., dancing, enjoying parties galore ..., listening to the tunes of your favorite band ...". The leaflet's back side reminds the soldier that his loved one is longing for him and that most of the men he had come with are now dead. In comparison, one Allied propaganda leaflet simply showed a picture of a large open field with thousands of German graves.

James A.C. Brown, a Scottish psychiatrist, summed up the WW2 experience with the observation that "Propaganda is successful only when directed at those who are willing to listen, absorb the information, and if possible act on it, and this happens only when the other side is in a condition of lowered morale and is already losing the campaign."

Before the B-29's exclusive deployment to the Pacific Theater began, the United States Army Air Forces initiated a disinformation campaign through leaflets over the Third Reich early in 1944 that hinted at what sorts of American heavy bombers were likely to appear over Germany in the future. Partly in conjunction with use of YB-29-BW 41-36393, the so-called Hobo Queen, one of the service test aircraft flown around several British airfields in early 1944, four-page German language Sternenbanner-headlined, American-published propaganda leaflets mentioning a "battle of annihilation against the Luftwaffe" (Vernichtungsschlacht gegen die Luftwaffe), dated to Leap Year Day in 1944, were dropped over the Reich, with the intent to deceive the Germans into believing that the B-29 would be deployed to Europe.

==== Japan ====
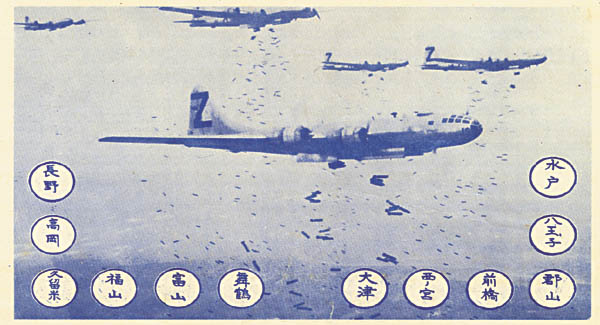
"Curtis LeMay Bombing Leaflet" from 1945 warning Japanese civilians to evacuate cities.

Leaflets were also used by the USAAF on Japan during the Pacific War. To create leaflets, Japan specialists and also Japanese prisoners of war were involved, and more than 500 million leaflets were dropped on Japan by the USAAF during the Pacific War. The leaflets aimed to not criticize Japan overall but to make citizens and soldiers demoralized and hostile toward Japanese military commanders. In mid-1945 it became apparent that B-29 bombers of the USAAF were raiding Japan's cities without meeting significant resistance. General Curtis LeMay, commander of the XXI Bomber Command, part of the Twentieth Air Force, consequently ordered the dropping of leaflets hoping to reduce the needless killing of innocent people. One of the leaflets dropped on targeted Japan's cities, with the text on the back, read:

Read this carefully as it may save your life or the life of a relative or a friend. In the next few days, some or all of the cities named on the reverse side will be destroyed by American bombs. These cities contain military installations and workshops or factories, which produce military goods. We are determined to destroy all of the tools of the military clique that they are using to prolong this useless war. Unfortunately, bombs have no eyes. So, in accordance with America's well-known humanitarian policies, the American Air Force, which does not wish to injure innocent people, now gives you warning to evacuate the cities named and save your lives.

America is not fighting the Japanese people but is fighting the military clique, which has enslaved the Japanese people. The peace, which America will bring, will free the people from the oppression of the Japanese military clique and mean the emergence of a new and better Japan.

You can restore peace by demanding new and better leaders who will end the War.

We cannot promise that only these cities will be among those attacked, but some or all of them will be, so heed this warning and evacuate these cities immediately.

B-29s dropped approximately 10 million propaganda leaflets in May, 20 million in June, and 30 million in July. The Japanese government implemented harsh penalties against civilians who kept copies of such leaflets, including surrender passes. In contrast, US soldiers could pick up leaflets dropped by Japan freely, and some kept them as souvenirs.

There were several types of leaflets produced by the OWI (Office of War Information) in the US. One of the famous leaflets is Kirihitoha (桐一葉) [One leaf of paulownia] which was suggested by Ayako Ishigaki a critic of the Japanese government who led a movement for military intervention against Japan in the United States. This leaflet was a transformation of a famous Japanese poem, and the designer seems to have hoped it would end the war. However, according to W. H. de Roos, the head of Australia's propaganda to Japan in the Far East Liaison Bureau, due to an inappropriate choice of words and the design appearing to show tobacco rather than autumn leaves, Kirihitoha was not able to appeal to the Japanese people.

Another famous leaflet is Unga-naizō (運賀無蔵) [Unlucky man] which shows a story designed by Taro Yashima, a painter and children's book author. The story of this leaflet portrayed soldiers dying meaninglessly while their commanders became rich, using "their lives as stepping stones". However, the leaflet was assessed badly by the Japanese leaflet design department. It was pointed out that the picture style was outdated, the core of the story was not clarified, and the background of the story was not suitable for the time. In addition, according to Linebarger who wrote "Psychological War", there was no remarkable effect caused by this leaflet.

The US side also created leaflets which utilized Japanese superstition. Gyoen-no-asa (御苑の朝) [Morning in the imperial garden], one of the leaflets, attempted to persuade Japanese people by their loyalty for the emperor. It was well known that if the emperor's honor was damaged, Japanese people would be infuriated, so the US side was careful about that aspect when making the leaflet. The leaflet is written to say "even though the emperor hopes for peace, Japanese military leaders focus on their self-interests and deceive the emperor" and it was an attempt to cause Japanese civilians to lose their motivation towards the war.

There was also a characteristic theme in the US leaflet which was to promote the rebellious spirit of Japanese people toward Germany. Some leaflets pointed to an internal discord by expressing that "Hitler will betray Japan". Besides, the US side decided to drop leaflets at areas which were dominated by Japan because they thought Japanese soldiers in those areas may have more free time to read leaflets compared with areas where fights are conducted harshly.

Leaflets of the enemy country were sometimes used as a strategy to raise hostility towards the enemy country. The US and Japan utilized each other's leaflet. They claimed in their own country's leaflet that "people in the US/Japan insult us, so we should hate them" while showing the enemy's leaflet.

During the Pacific War, the Japanese military sprinkled airborne leaflets to promote surrender and lose fighting spirit. To attract the attention of people who find leaflets, manga artists were involved because it was guessed that only proclamation of a rigid military commander might not work well. Furthermore, the Japanese leaflet design department interviewed knowledgeable people about US and detective writers, like Yūsuke Tsurumi and Ranpo Edogawa, to study and design leaflets.

After the Pacific War, US psychological strategy's aim shifted to Japanese civilians. They cherished telling the truth and avoiding criticizing the Japanese emperor. By telling the truth, they expected that it could keep the credibility of information on the leaflet and cause disappointment toward the present situation of war. Moreover, treating Japanese citizens and the Japanese emperor as victims of the war was another strategy of psychological warfare. They expressed that the emperor and citizens are pacifist, but the cabinet which caused the war is evil in their leaflet. Leaflets also accused the Japanese government of disturbing the peace between the emperor and citizens. The Japanese emperor is an existence who a top of Japan in terms of spirit. He had been treated as a god, and there was a manner to write his name and to speak of his picture, where to live, name of his body, and so on. Therefore, if the leaflet would hurt the Japanese emperor's dignity, Japanese people couldn't accept the contents of the leaflet. Instead, the US side pointed up the inefficiency of the Japanese cabinet and tried to weaken their credibility.

As one of the leaflets by the US which was given to Japanese civilians, a leaflet which resembles a Japanese money bill and included the message on the back was created. This money leaflet can draw the attention of people who find the leaflet and prompt them to read by utilizing human's natural characteristics which favor money. In addition, there was an intention to cause inflation in Japan by dropping fake money without such a psychological message for civilians. That fake bill was produced secretly during Operation "Toy Horse" in California. These fake bills appeared in a Japanese newspaper.

After the war, the US sent 1,150 surveyers to Japan to search about the result of psychological warfare by leaflet propaganda. According to the survey, 49% of Japanese people answered that they saw the leaflet during the war. For the reaction of civilians, they did not care about leaflets from the US and they felt the contents of leaflets were childish at first. That can say early leaflet propaganda strategy by the US was unsuccessful. However, the result was starting to appear around the end of the war. The US dropped the leaflet which clarified the fact that Japan is overwhelmed by the US, the present predicament such as food shortage, and a fear of air raids. As a result, the worse the war situation was getting, the more Japanese people were affected by the leaflet.

For the reaction of the Japanese government toward the leaflet dropped by the US, they showed much reaction according to Kiyoshi Kiyosawa who was a Diplomatic critic and journalist. Basically, the counterplan was settled after leaflets were dropped. The Japanese government issued the rule that anyone who finds a leaflet must submit it to the government. If the leaflet would not be submitted, the finder was sent to the prisons for 3 months or had to pay a penalty. At first, 70 or 80% leaflets were submitted, but it did not reach 50% around the end of the war. As another government deal, popular persons announced the warning about leaflets in newspapers, magazines, and street speech. They said "do not read, do not listen to the US leaflet" to normal citizens. After a while, the Japanese government tried to spread fake information about the US strategy that the US military drops chocolate laced with poisons and pencils with explosives inside and they were willing to kill even children. However, there was no evidence that the US military dropped such goods, so it was just a lie as one solution by the government toward the US leaflet strategy. It was called the "atrocity stories" strategy that emphasizing cruelty of people in enemy countries, and the strategy was used well in other countries after World War 1. The effect of US leaflets can be seen during the controversy of whether Japan should surrender or continue resistance. Because the leaflets might cause soldiers who read it to riot, the Japanese emperor decided to surrender.

=== After World War II ===
Circa 1954, the CIA distributed tens of thousands of leaflets throughout Latin America, possibly by plane.

Before the U.S. invaded Cuba in 1961, it dropped 12,000,000 pounds of propaganda leaflets on the country.

Although leaflet propaganda has been effective, their use has declined due to the advancements of satellite, television, and radio technology.

Six billion leaflets were dropped in Western Europe and 40 million leaflets dropped by the United States Army Air Forces over Japan in 1945 during World War II. One billion were used during the Korean War while only 31 million were used in the Iraq War. Other conflicts where leaflet propaganda has been used are Vietnam, Afghanistan (both during the Soviet and more recent NATO invasions), and the Gulf War. Coalition forces dropped pamphlets encouraging Iraqi Army troops not to fight during the first Gulf War, which contributed to eighty-seven thousand Iraqi troops surrendering in 1991.

In 1992, Ly Tong (a former soldier of the Republic of Vietnam Air Force) hijacked Vietnam Airlines Flight 850 to drop leaflets calling on people to overthrow the Vietnamese government. He himself continued to use planes to drop leaflets calling for opposition to the governments of Cuba, Vietnam and North Korea in 1999, 2000 and 2008.

During the Korean War, Chinese forces alleged that the United States used leaflet bombs as a vehicle for dispersing biological warfare agents. The United States government consistently denied such allegations.

During the 2011 enforcement of a NATO No-Fly Zone over Libya, the Royal Canadian Air Force and U.S. Air Force used C-130J Hercules and CP-140 Aurora aircraft to broadcast radio signals and drop leaflets over Gaddafi controlled areas. The messages predominantly asked Muammar Gaddafi's troops to return to their families and homes for their safety, but also included the message: "The forces of the Gaddafi regime are violating United Nations Resolution 1973." Some messages called on the troops to stop hostilities and not to harm their compatriots, while other messages broadcast by NATO included female voices asking Gaddafi's forces to "stop killing children".

Leaflet propaganda was also used in the Syrian civil war to deter possible ISIS recruits from joining in 2015.

During Gaza war, the Israel Defense Forces dropped thousands of leaflets over Gaza, offering rewards for information on hostages taken during the conflict and urging civilians living in the north half of the Gaza Strip to evacuate.

== Means of delivery ==
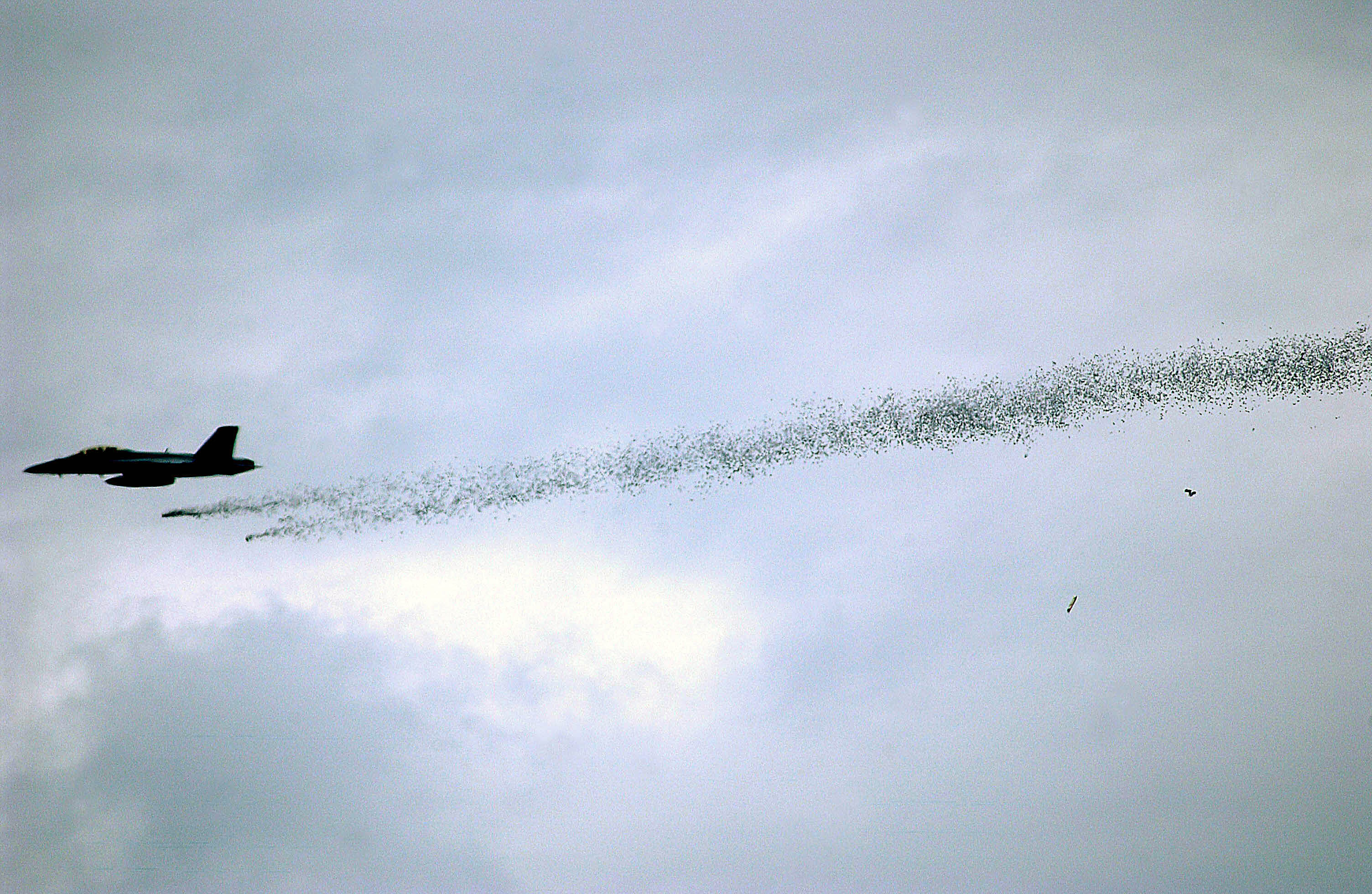
A US Navy F/A-18 drops a leaflet bomb during a training exercise (2005)

One method is dropping leaflets from an open hatchway. Another method is the "leaflet bomb": a bomb-shaped but non-explosive container that drops from the aircraft and opens in mid-air to disperse leaflets – up to tens of thousands of leaflets per "bomb". U.S. leaflet bombs include the PDU-5B dispenser unit, the LBU30 and the older M129E1/E2. The M129 weighs 52 kilograms (115 lb) when empty and about 100 kilograms (220 lb) loaded. It can contain 60,000 to 80,000 leaflets. At a pre-determined time after release, the two halves of the bomb's outer shell are blown apart by detonating cord, dispersing the leaflet payload. Soviet/Russian leaflet bombs include the AGITAB-250-85 and the AGITAB-500-300 (used during the First Chechen War).

== Use by revolutionary groups ==
Leaflet bombs were used during the Jewish insurgency in Mandatory Palestine in 1945. The Irgun developed a bomb that was deposited in the street and scattered leaflets over a wide area. In September 1945 three leaflet bombs in Jerusalem injured nine people.

In the late 1960s the African National Congress (ANC) used a version of the leaflet bomb in the internal resistance to apartheid in South Africa. This bomb was developed in collaboration with the South African Communist Party (SACP) and South Africans living in exile in London. The first time this leaflet bomb, known to South African activists as the "bucket bomb" and to the South African police forces as the "ideological bomb", was used was in 1967. This was one of the most important propaganda weapons of the ANC who devoted major resources to it and used it frequently during the 1960s and 1970s, spreading tens of thousands of leaflets. A 1970 article from the ANC's journal Sechaba, looking back at the uses of leaflets as propaganda in the 1960s, stated:

It was in this new period that underground propaganda, demonstrating the effectiveness of the ANC machinery and projecting its voice, became of incalculable value. Underground leaflets began to appear in the townships, factories and city streets. Passed on from hand to hand, these reminded the people that the spirit of resistance must never die. These were often complemented by slogans painted on walls proclaiming: "Free Mandela", "Free Sisulu" and "Long Live the ANC". As modest as these propaganda efforts were ... they showed that the ANC could survive the most severe measures of the regime.

The South African press and security forces also saw it as a weapon of the ANC and police threatened to take action against the South African press for publishing ANC leaflets.

The leaflet bomb has been used in Latin America by various groups advocating political violence.

In the 1980s the FMLN in the Salvadoran Civil War used "propaganda bombs". It was favored by urban militia groups and used in public places like markets or parks. The "bombs" consisted of a cardboard box with a small, low-power explosive underneath a large number of propaganda leaflets. The explosive was set off by a homemade time igniter. The box was disguised to look like any ordinary package or box that might be carried by someone going or returning from a trip to the marketplace.

The use of leaflet bombs played a part in the FMLN's recruitment process known to them as fogueo – which meant to experience fire or fire-harden something – which was the process by which the recruits "were toughened and the weak and fainthearted were weeded out". The process began with low-level information-gathering and propaganda activities in support of FMLN.

In Honduras, the Popular Movement for Liberation (MPL) and Morazanist Patriotic Front (FPM) also used propaganda bombs during the 1990s.

The Guatemalan National Revolutionary Unity in the Guatemalan Civil War also used leaflet bombs. In 1996 the group occupied a radio station and set off a leaflet bomb.

In Ecuador several groups have used leaflet bombs. The Revolutionary Armed Corps (CAR) was according to the Ecuadorian police "an extreme leftist group" which is only known for one attempted attack on February 20, 2001, when a leaflet bomb containing 150 pamphlets was discovered and successfully defused by the police.

The communist Group of Popular Combatants (GCP) has used leaflet bombs on several occasions during 2001–2005. In 2001 it was blamed by authorities for a pamphlet bomb and later the same year the group claimed responsibility for detonating a pamphlet bomb in downtown Quito that let out hundreds of pamphlets protesting against Plan Colombia. In 2002 the Revolutionary Armed Forces of Ecuador set off a leaflet bomb in an Arcos Dorados restaurant in Guayaquil that injured three people and caused severe damage to the property.

== See also ==
- Operation Cornflakes
