= Meyn =

Meyn may refer to:

== People ==
- Erik Meyn (born 1955), Norwegian journalist, TV host and TV director
- Ludwig Meyn (1820–1878), German scientist
- Niels Meyn (1891–1957), Danish author
- Peter Meyn (1749–1808), Danish architect
- Robert Meyn (1896–1972), German actor
- Wilhelm Meyn (1923–2002), German general
- Christopher Meyn (1969–2018), American Economist

== Places ==
- Meyn, Schleswig-Holstein, Germany

== Other ==
- Meyn Food Processing Technology
