= Christopher Meyn =

American investor and economist

Christopher David Meyn
- Born: February 27, 1969; Oregon, United States
- Died: November 4, 2018 (aged 49); Damascus, Oregon, U.S.
- Education: B.A. in Economics, Stanford University (1989)
- Occupations: Investor, economist, investment banker, entrepreneur
- Known for: Private equity in Brazil
- Board member of: Arcos Dorados, WorldFund, Gávea Investimentos, LAVCA

Christopher David Meyn (February 27, 1969 – November 4, 2018) was an American investor and economist. He worked in private equity in Brazil.

Meyn was a partner at Gávea Investimentos, where he managed illiquid strategies and oversaw the firm's private equity operations. He also served as Head of Illiquid Strategies for J.P. Morgan Asset Management's private equity division after J.P. Morgan acquired a majority stake in Gávea.

== Early life and education ==
Born on February 26, 1969, in Oregon, United States, Meyn graduated from Stanford University in 1989 with a Bachelor of Arts degree with honors in Economics. While at Stanford, Meyn was a member of the school's rugby team.

== Career ==
=== Early Career and Latinvest ===
Meyn began his professional career in the early 1990s as an investment banker in mergers and acquisitions for Dean Witter Reynolds (1990-1993). He then served as the Vice President of Finance for The Marks Group (1993-1995), a U.S.-based telecommunications holding company. From 1995 to 1997, he was Vice President for Dick Clark International Cable Ventures, specializing in the acquisition and development of telecom licenses in Latin America.

In 1997, Meyn became Managing Director and Investment Committee member for Latinvest Asset Management and its U.S.-based parent, Globalvest Management Company. Globalvest was an independent U.S.-based asset manager focused on value investing in Latin American equities. In this role, Meyn was responsible for the firm's private equity and venture capital initiatives in Latin America. At Latinvest, Meyn coordinated early investment rounds into O Site, Universo Online and Módulo. Latinvest later became Latintech, just before the start of the internet bubble.

=== Gávea Investimentos ===
Meyn joined Gávea Investimentos in January 2006 as a Partner responsible for the day-to-day management of Gávea's illiquid strategies. During his tenure, Gávea raised capital for its private equity funds. Gávea Private Equity Fund III closed with $1.2 billion in commitments in 2012, and Gávea Private Equity Fund V closed with $1.1 billion in 2014. Meyn raised over $5 billion dollars in his career at Gávea.

Meyn was involved in transactions during his time at Gávea. He was part of the team that advised on Gávea's investment in Cosan, a Brazilian energy and infrastructure company. He also served on the board of directors for Arcos Dorados Holdings, the largest McDonald's franchisee in Latin America.

In 2014, Meyn received the M&A Atlas Award for his contributions to the private equity industry in Brazil. Meyn also served on the board of Worldfund, a non-profit organization focused on education in Latin America.

=== J.P. Morgan Asset Management ===
Following J.P. Morgan's acquisition of a majority stake in Gávea Investimentos in 2010, Meyn became Head of Illiquid Strategies for J.P. Morgan Asset Management's private equity division. In this role, he continued to oversee private equity investments in Brazil and Latin America. His work and commentary was covered in financial publications including Institutional Investor, Exame, Bloomberg, Capital Aberto, and the Wall Street Journal In 2015, Meyn departed from Gávea Investimentos to pursue other opportunities.

== Death ==
Christopher Meyn died in an automobile accident on November 4, 2018, near Damascus, Oregon at the age of 49.
