= Psychological warfare =

Information operations to assist military objectives

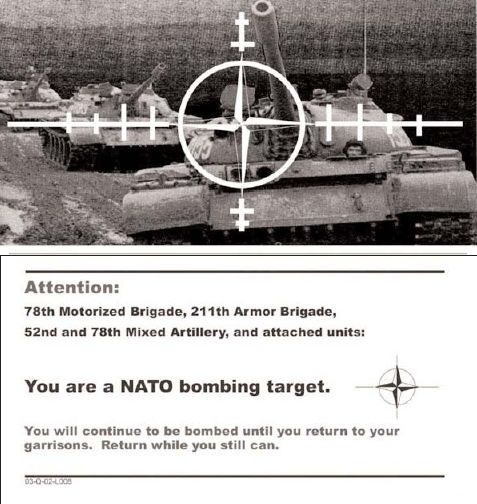
A leaflet by NATO during the bombing of Yugoslavia

Psychological warfare (PSYWAR), also termed psychological operations (PSYOPs), is a term which refers to the attempts of a military to gain an advantage via affecting the psychological state of others. The term is often used "to denote any action which is practiced mainly by psychological methods with the aim of evoking a planned psychological reaction in other people".

Various techniques are used, and are aimed at influencing a target audience's value system, belief system, emotions, motives, reasoning, or behavior. It is used to induce confessions or reinforce attitudes and behaviors favorable to the originator's objectives, and are sometimes combined with black operations or false flag tactics. It is also used to destroy the morale of enemies through tactics that aim to depress troops' psychological states.

Target audiences can be governments, organizations, groups, and individuals, and is not just limited to soldiers. Civilians of foreign territories can also be targeted by technology and media so as to cause an effect on the government of their country.

Stories are said to be a key factor in a successful operation. Mass communication such as radio allows for direct communication with an enemy populace, and therefore has been used in many efforts. Social media channels and the internet allow for campaigns of disinformation and misinformation performed by agents anywhere in the world.

== History ==
=== Modern era ===
The rise of the printing press and mass communication greatly increased the use of psyops for military advantage. During the Indian Wars of the 17th through 19th centuries, politicians, newspaper reports and fictional novels about Native Americans all conveyed the belief that tribes in the Northeast had "died out," and leaders of New England communities even gave speeches about the "last Indians" in New England, even as Native Americans continued to live in these communities.

During the War of 1812, British forces under Major-general Sir Isaac Brock captured Fort Detroit using psychological warfare. On 15 August 1812, Brock sent his aide-de-camp to Fort Detroit with a letter demanding the American garrison's immediate surrender. In the letter, Brock warned that he would not be able to restrain his Native American allies if they attacked the fort:

It is far from my inclination to join in a war of extermination, but you must be aware that the numerous body of Indians who have attached themselves to my troops will be beyond my control the moment the contest commences.

Although the garrison's commander, Brigadier General William Hull, initially refused to surrender, on 16 August he changed his mind thanks to Brock's letter and signed articles of capitulation with the British. The entire American garrison of 2,188 regulars and militia became British prisoners in a "colossal disaster for the United States." The British victory demoralised the Americans and boosted the morale of Canadian soldiers and civilians along with Tecumseh's confederacy.

=== World War I ===
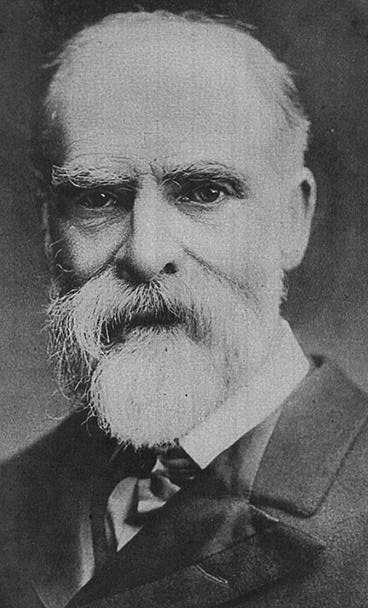
Lord Bryce led the commission of 1915 to document German atrocities committed against Belgian civilians.

The start of modern psychological operations in war is generally dated to World War I. By that point, Western societies were increasingly educated and urbanized, and mass media was available in the form of large circulation newspapers and posters. It was also possible to transmit propaganda to the enemy via the use of airborne leaflets or through explosive delivery systems like modified artillery or mortar rounds.

The British also had a diplomatic service that maintained good relations with many nations around the world, in contrast to the reputation of the German services.

In August 1914, David Lloyd George appointed a Member of Parliament (MP), Charles Masterman, to head a Propaganda Agency at Wellington House. A distinguished body of literary talent was enlisted for the task, with its members including Arthur Conan Doyle, Ford Madox Ford, G. K. Chesterton, Thomas Hardy, Rudyard Kipling and H. G. Wells. Over 1,160 pamphlets were published during the war and distributed to neutral countries, and eventually, to Germany. One of the first significant publications, the Report on Alleged German Outrages of 1915, had a great effect on general opinion across the world. The pamphlet documented atrocities, both actual and alleged, committed by the German army against Belgian civilians. A Dutch illustrator, Louis Raemaekers, provided the highly emotional drawings which appeared in the pamphlet.

In 1917, the bureau was subsumed into the new Department of Information and branched out into telegraph communications, radio, newspapers, magazines and the cinema. In 1918, Viscount Northcliffe was appointed Director of Propaganda in Enemy Countries. The department was split between propaganda against Germany organized by H.G Wells, and propaganda against the Austro-Hungarian Empire supervised by Wickham Steed and Robert William Seton-Watson; the attempts of the latter focused on the lack of ethnic cohesion in the Empire and stoked the grievances of minorities such as the Croats and Slovenes. It had a significant effect on the final collapse of the Austro-Hungarian Army at the Battle of Vittorio Veneto.

Aerial leaflets were dropped over German trenches containing postcards from prisoners of war detailing their humane conditions, surrender notices and general propaganda against the Kaiser and the German generals. By the end of the war, MI7b had distributed almost 26 million leaflets. The Germans began shooting the leaflet-dropping pilots, prompting the British to develop unmanned leaflet balloons that drifted across no-man's land. At least one in seven of these leaflets were not handed in by the soldiers to their superiors, despite severe penalties for that offence. Even General Hindenburg admitted that "Unsuspectingly, many thousands consumed the poison", and POWs admitted to being disillusioned by the propaganda leaflets that depicted the use of German troops as mere cannon fodder. In 1915, the British began airdropping a regular leaflet newspaper Le Courrier de l'Air for civilians in German-occupied France and Belgium.

At the start of the war, the French government took control of the media to suppress negative coverage. Only in 1916, with the establishment of the Maison de la Presse, did they begin to use similar tactics for the purpose of psychological warfare. One of its sections was the "Service de la Propagande aérienne" (Aerial Propaganda Service), headed by Professor Tonnelat and Jean-Jacques Waltz, an Alsatian artist code-named "Hansi". The French tended to distribute leaflets of images only, although the full publication of US President Woodrow Wilson's Fourteen Points, which had been heavily edited in the German newspapers, was distributed via airborne leaflets by the French.

The Central Powers were slow to use these techniques; however, at the start of the war the Germans succeeded in inducing the Sultan of the Ottoman Empire to declare 'holy war', or Jihad, against the Western infidels. They also attempted to foment rebellion against the British Empire in places as far afield as Ireland, Afghanistan, and India. The Germans' greatest success was in giving the Russian revolutionary, Lenin, free transit on a sealed train from Switzerland to Finland after the overthrow of the Tsar. This soon paid off when the Bolshevik Revolution took Russia out of the war.

=== World War II ===
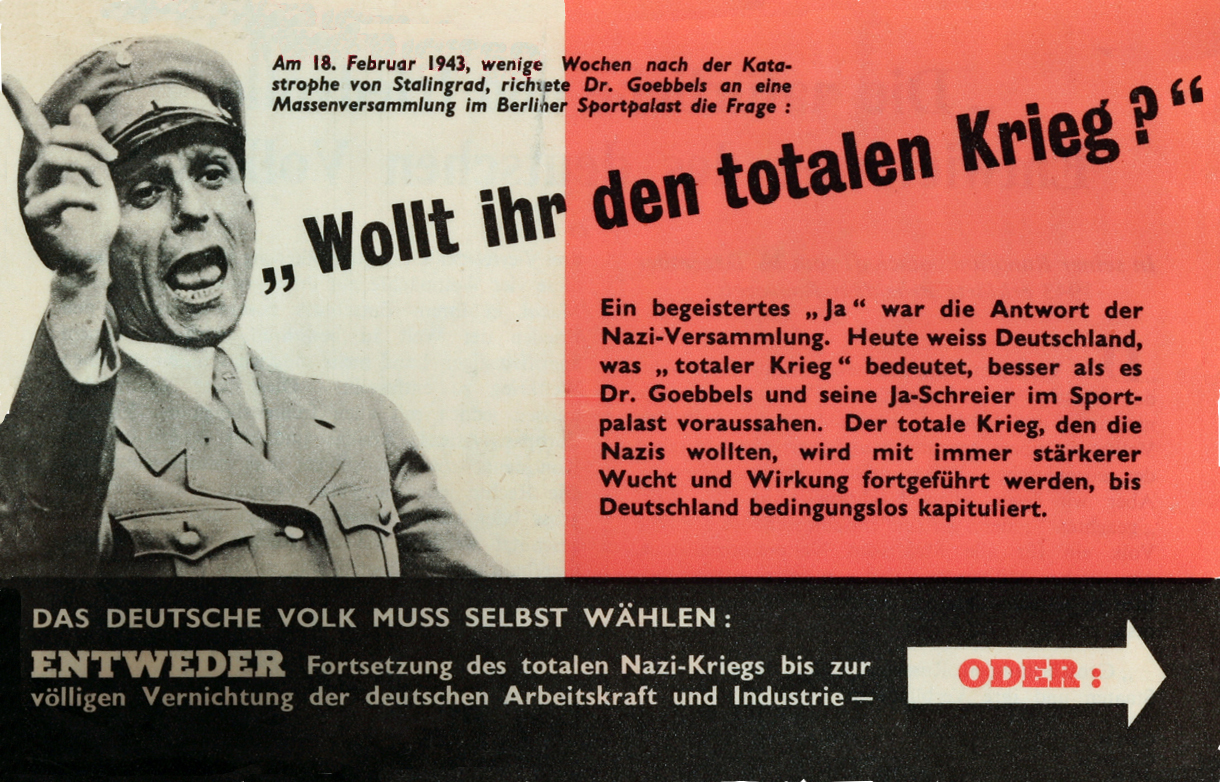
A leaflet meant to be dropped from an American B-17 over German cities (see the file description page for a translation)

Germany's Fall Grün plan of invasion of Czechoslovakia had a large part dealing with psychological warfare aimed both at the Czechoslovak civilians and government as well as, crucially, at Czechoslovakia's allies.

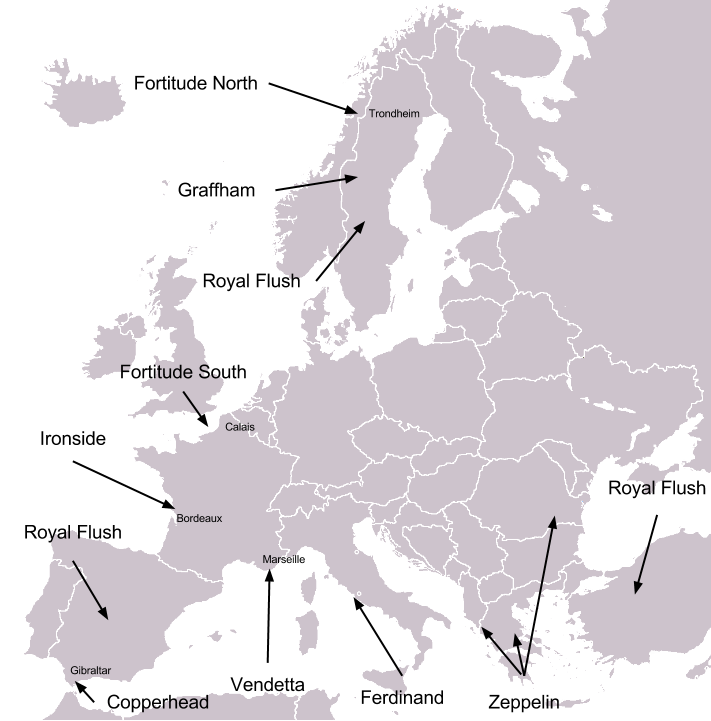
Map depicting the targets of all the subordinate plans of Operation Bodyguard

During World War II, the British made extensive use of deception – developing many new techniques and theories. The main protagonists at this time were 'A' Force, set up in 1940 under Dudley Clarke, and the London Controlling Section, chartered in 1942 under the control of John Bevan. Clarke pioneered many of the strategies of military deception. His ideas for combining fictional orders of battle, visual deception and double agents helped define Allied deception strategy during the war, for which he has been referred to as "the greatest British deceiver of WW2".

Elaborate naval deceptions (Operations Glimmer, Taxable and Big Drum) were undertaken in the English Channel. Small ships and aircraft simulated invasion fleets lying off Pas de Calais, Cap d'Antifer and the western flank of the real invasion force. At the same time Operation Titanic involved the RAF dropping fake paratroopers to the east and west of the Normandy landings.

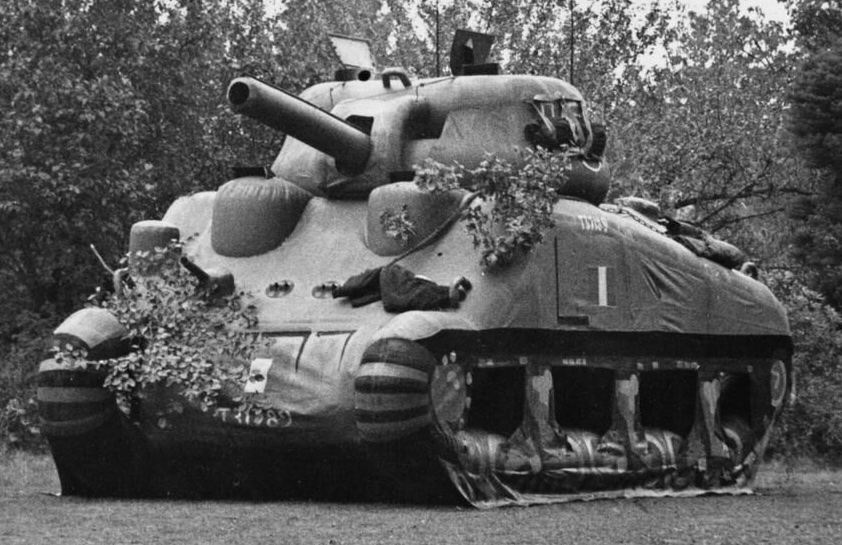
A dummy Sherman tank, used to deceive the Germans

The deceptions were implemented with the use of double agents, radio traffic and visual deception. The British "Double Cross" anti-espionage operation had proven very successful from the outset of the war, and the LCS was able to use double agents to send back misleading information about Allied invasion plans. The use of visual deception, including mock tanks and other military hardware had been developed during the North Africa campaign. Mock hardware was created for Bodyguard; in particular, dummy landing craft were stockpiled to give the impression that the invasion would take place near Calais.

The operation was a strategic success and the Normandy landings caught German defences unaware. Continuing deception, portraying the landings as a diversion from a forthcoming main invasion in the Calais region, led Hitler into delaying transferring forces from Calais to the real battleground for nearly seven weeks.

=== Vietnam War ===
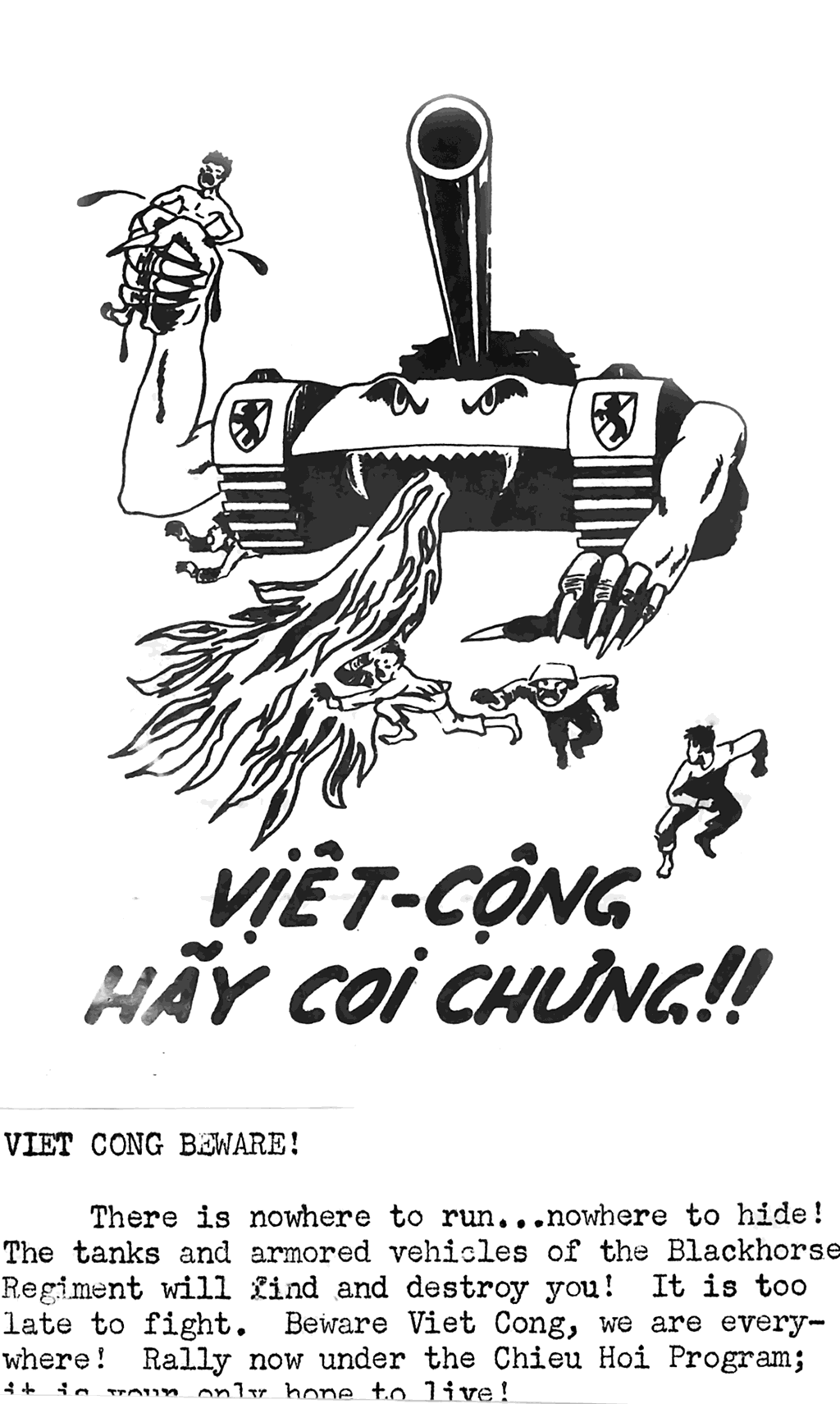
"Viet Cong, beware!" – South Vietnam leaflets urging the defection of Viet Cong

The United States ran an extensive program of psychological warfare during the Vietnam War. The Phoenix Program had the dual aim of assassinating National Liberation Front of South Vietnam (NLF or Viet Cong) personnel and terrorizing any potential sympathizers or passive supporters. During the Phoenix Program, over 19,000 NLF supporters were killed. In Operation Wandering Soul, the United States also used tapes of distorted human sounds and played them during the night making the Vietnamese soldiers think that the dead were back for revenge.

The Vietcong and their forces also used a program of psychological warfare during this war. Trịnh Thị Ngọ, also known as Thu Hương and Hanoi Hannah, was a Vietnamese radio personality. She made English-language broadcasts for North Vietnam directed at United States troops. During the Vietnam War, Ngọ became famous among US soldiers for her propaganda broadcasts on Radio Hanoi. Her scripts were written by the North Vietnamese Army and were intended to frighten and shame the soldiers into leaving their posts. She made three broadcasts a day, reading a list of newly killed or imprisoned Americans, and playing popular US anti-war songs in an effort to incite feelings of nostalgia and homesickness, attempting to persuade US GIs that the US involvement in the Vietnam War was unjust and immoral. A typical broadcast began as follows:

How are you, GI Joe? It seems to me that most of you are poorly informed about the going of the war, to say nothing about a correct explanation of your presence over here. Nothing is more confused than to be ordered into a war to die or to be maimed for life without the faintest idea of what's going on.

=== 21st century ===
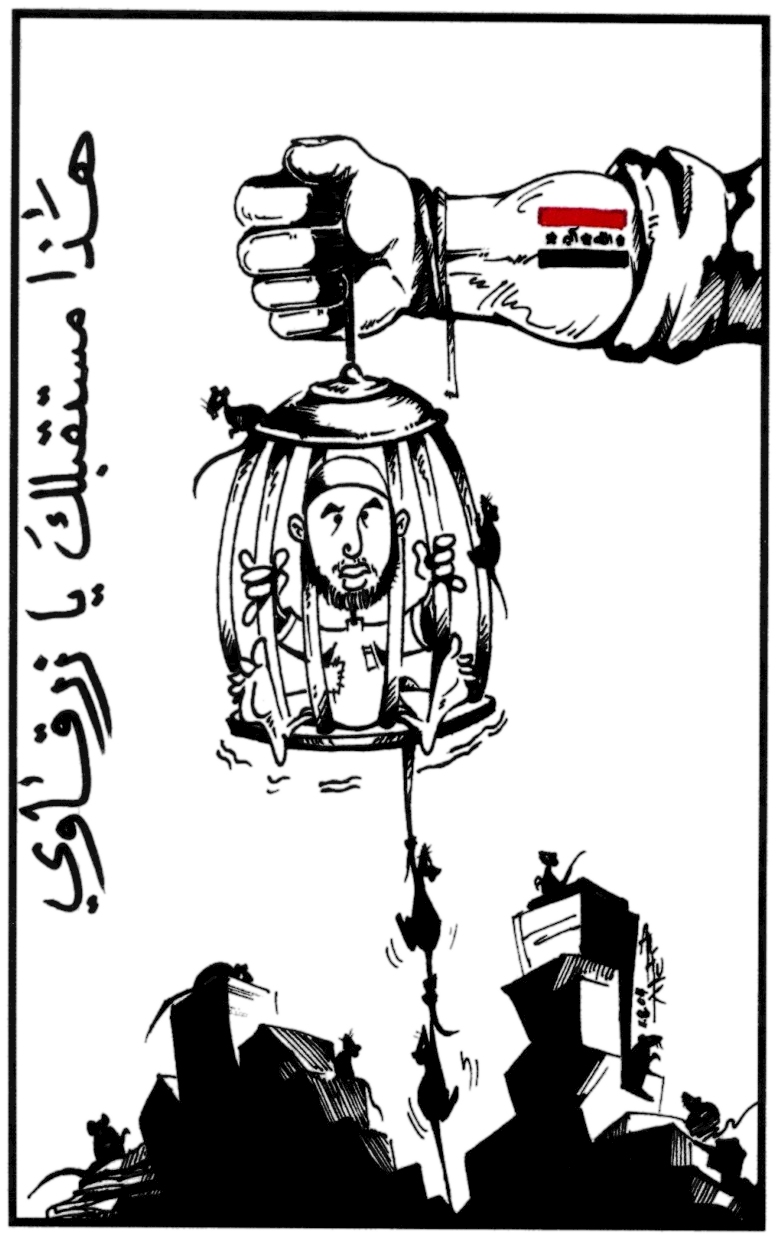
An American PSYOP leaflet disseminated during the Iraq War. It shows a caricature of Al-Qaeda in Iraq leader Abu Musab al-Zarqawi caught in a rat trap. The caption reads "This is your future, Zarqawi".

The CIA made extensive use of Contra soldiers to destabilize the Sandinista government in Nicaragua.

In cyberspace, social media has enabled the use of disinformation on a wide scale. Analysts have found evidence of doctored or misleading photographs spread by social media in the Syrian Civil War and 2014 Russian military intervention in Ukraine, possibly with state involvement. Military and governments have engaged in psychological operations (PSYOP) and informational warfare (IW) on social networking platforms to regulate foreign propaganda, which includes countries like the US, Russia, and China.

In 2022, Meta and the Stanford Internet Observatory found that over five years people associated with the U.S. military, who tried to conceal their identities, created fake accounts on social media systems including Balatarin, Facebook, Instagram, Odnoklassniki, Telegram, Twitter, VKontakte and YouTube in an influence operation in Central Asia and the Middle East. Their posts, primarily in Arabic, Persian and Russian, criticized Iran, China and Russia and gave pro-Western narratives. Data suggested the activity was a series of covert campaigns rather than a single operation.

In operations in the South and East China Seas, both the United States and China have been engaged in "cognitive warfare", which involves displays of force, staged photographs and sharing disinformation. The start of the public use of "cognitive warfare" as a clear movement occurred in 2013 with China's political rhetoric.

== Examples of the term ==
Daniel Lerner divides psychological warfare operations into three categories:

- White propaganda (omissions and emphasis): Truthful and not strongly biased, where the source of information is acknowledged.
- Grey propaganda (omissions, emphasis and racial/ethnic/religious bias): Largely truthful, containing no information that can be proven wrong; the source is not identified.
- Black propaganda (commissions of falsification): Inherently deceitful, information given in the product is attributed to a source that was not responsible for its creation.

Lerner says grey and black operations ultimately have a heavy cost, in that the target population sooner or later recognizes them as propaganda and discredits the source. He writes, "This is one of the few dogmas advanced by Sykewarriors that is likely to endure as an axiom of propaganda: Credibility is a condition of persuasion. Before you can make a man do as you say, you must make him believe what you say."

Terrorism is viewed by Boaz as a form of psychological warfare as it "undermines the sense of security" and safety of populations who are targeted for attacks. It has the propensity to damage the target country's capability to function. Terrorism as a strategy aims to influence public opinion into pressuring leaders to give in to the terrorists' demands, and the population becomes a tool to advance the political agenda. The threat of chemical weapons also can influence societies in decision making.

In Propaganda: The Formation of Men's Attitudes, Jacques Ellul discusses psychological warfare as a common peace policy practice between nations as a form of indirect aggression. This type of propaganda drains the public opinion of an opposing regime by stripping away its power on public opinion. This form of aggression is hard to defend against because no international court of justice is capable of protecting against psychological aggression since it cannot be legally adjudicated.

"Here the propagandists is [sic] dealing with a foreign adversary whose morale he seeks to destroy by psychological means so that the opponent begins to doubt the validity of his beliefs and actions."

== By country ==
=== China ===
According to U.S. military analysts, attacking the enemy's mind is an important element of Chinese Communist Party and People's Republic of China's military strategy. This type of warfare is rooted in the Chinese Stratagems outlined by Sun Tzu in The Art of War and Thirty-Six Stratagems. In its dealings with its rivals, the Chinese government routinely flexes its economic and military muscle to persuade other nations to act in the Chinese government's interests. The Chinese government also tries to control the media to keep a tight hold on propaganda efforts for its people. The Chinese government also utilizes cognitive warfare against Taiwan and a technique that some have termed "calculated opportunistic strategic outrage."

=== France ===
The Centre interarmées des actions sur l'environnement is an organization made up of 300 soldiers whose mission is to assure to the four service arm of the French Armed Forces psychological warfare capacities. Deployed in particular to Mali and Afghanistan, its missions "consist in better explaining and accepting the action of French forces in operation with local actors and thus gaining their trust: direct aid to the populations, management of reconstruction sites, actions of communication of influence with the population, elites and local elected officials". The center has capacities for analysis, influence, expertise and instruction.

=== Germany ===
In the German Bundeswehr, the Zentrum Operative Kommunikation is responsible for PSYOP efforts. The center is subordinate to the Cyber and Information Domain Service branch alongside multiple IT and Electronic Warfare battalions and consists of around 1000 soldiers. One project of the German PSYOP forces is the radio station Stimme der Freiheit (Sada-e Azadi, Voice of Freedom), heard by thousands of Afghans. Another is the publication of various newspapers and magazines in Kosovo and Afghanistan, where German soldiers serve with NATO.

=== Iran ===
The Iranian government had an operation program to use the 2022 FIFA World Cup as a psyop against concurrent people's protests.

=== Israel ===
The Israeli government and its military make use of psychological warfare. In 2021, Israeli newspaper Haaretz revealed that "Abu Ali Express", a popular news page on Telegram and Twitter purportedly dedicated to "Arab affairs", was actually run by a Jewish Israeli paid consultant to the Israel Defense Forces (IDF). The IDF's psyops account had been the source of a number of noteworthy reports that were afterwards cited by the Israeli and international media.

=== United Kingdom ===
The British were one of the first major military powers to use psychological warfare in the First and Second World Wars. In the current British Armed Forces, PsyOps are handled by the tri-service 15 Psychological Operations Group. (See also MI5 and Secret Intelligence Service). The Psychological Operations Group comprises over 150 personnel, approximately 75 from the regular Armed Services and 75 from the Reserves. The Group supports deployed commanders in the provision of psychological operations in operational and tactical environments.

The Group was established immediately after the 1991 Gulf War, has since grown significantly in size to meet operational requirements, and since 2015 has been one of the sub-units of the 77th Brigade, formerly called the Security Assistance Group.

In June 2015, NSA files published by Glenn Greenwald revealed details of the JTRIG group at British intelligence agency GCHQ covertly manipulating online communities. This is in line with JTRIG's goal: to "destroy, deny, degrade [and] disrupt" enemies by "discrediting" them, planting misinformation and shutting down their communications.

In March 2019, it emerged that the Defence Science and Technology Laboratory (DSTL) of the UK's Ministry of Defence (MoD) is tendering to arms companies and universities for £70M worth of assistance under a project to develop new methods of psychological warfare. The project is known as the human and social sciences research capability (HSSRC).

=== United States ===
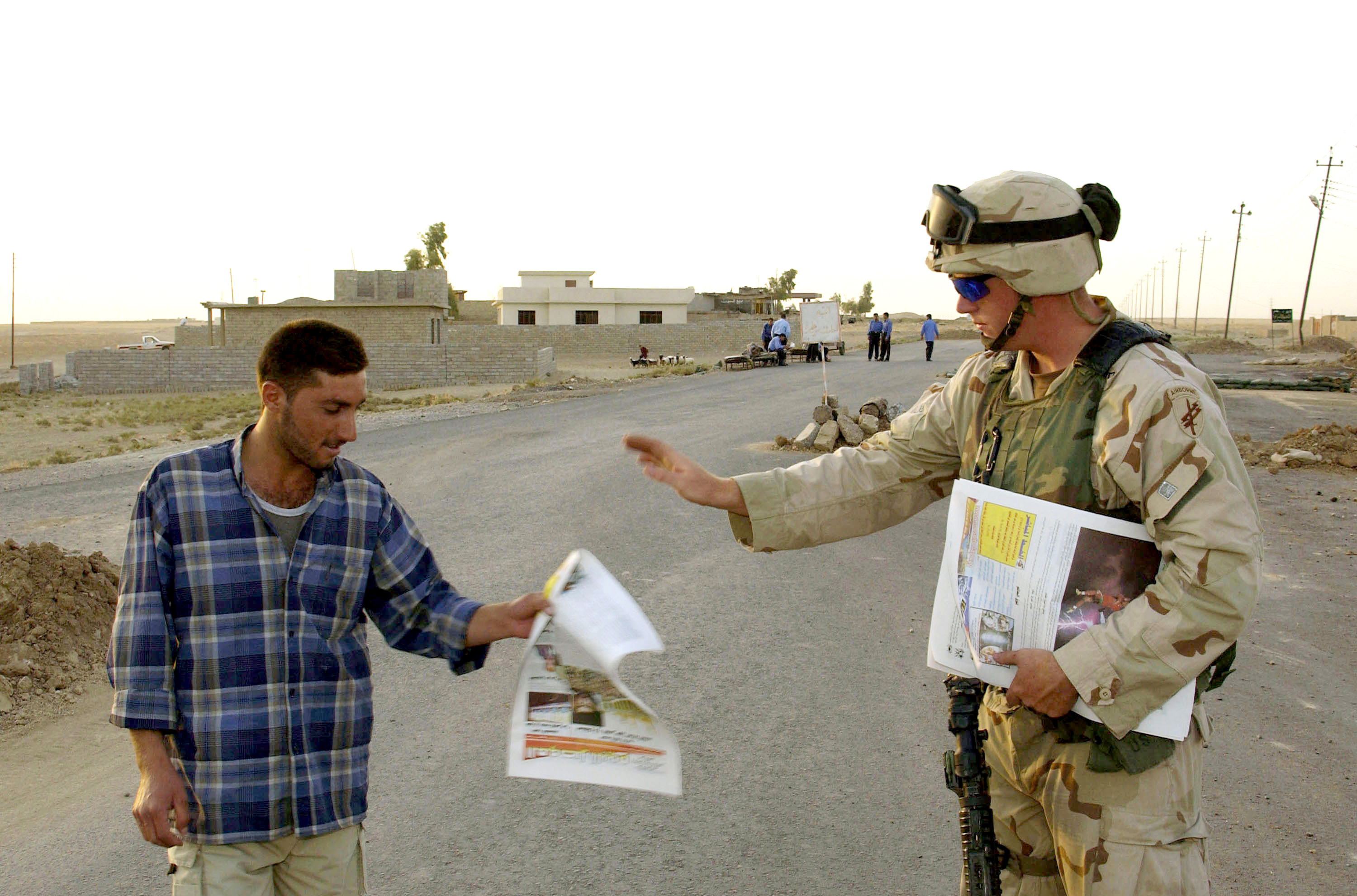
U.S. Army soldier hands out a newspaper to a local in Mosul, Iraq.

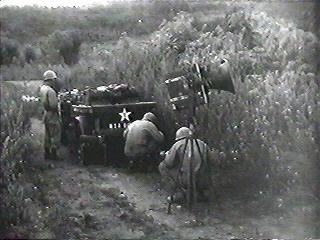
U.S. Army loudspeaker team in action in Korea

The term psychological warfare is believed to have migrated from Germany to the United States in 1941. During World War II, the United States Joint Chiefs of Staff defined psychological warfare broadly, stating "Psychological warfare employs any weapon to influence the mind of the enemy. The weapons are psychological only in the effect they produce and not because of the weapons themselves." The U.S. Department of Defense (DoD) currently defines psychological warfare as:

"The planned use of propaganda and other psychological actions having the primary purpose of influencing the opinions, emotions, attitudes, and behavior of hostile foreign groups in such a way as to support the achievement of national objectives."

This definition indicates that a critical element of the U.S. psychological operations capabilities includes propaganda and by extension counterpropaganda. Joint Publication 3–53 establishes specific policy to use public affairs mediums to counter propaganda from foreign origins.

The purpose of United States psychological operations is to induce or reinforce attitudes and behaviors favorable to US objectives. The Special Activities Center (SAC) is a division of the Central Intelligence Agency's Directorate of Operations, responsible for Covert Action and "Special Activities". These special activities include covert political influence (which includes psychological operations) and paramilitary operations. SAC's political influence group is the only US unit allowed to conduct these operations covertly and is considered the primary unit in this area.

A U.S. Army field manual released in January 2013 states that "Inform and Influence Activities" are critical for describing, directing, and leading military operations. Several Army Division leadership staff are assigned to “planning, integration and synchronization of designated information-related capabilities."

Journalist and fiction writer P.W. Singer, author of Wired for War, teaches military leaders about how to incorporate "useful fiction" stories and narrative structure into military psyops.

In September 2022, the DoD launched an audit of covert information warfare after social media companies identified a suspected U.S. military operation.

== See also ==
- Active measures
- Asymmetric warfare
- Brainwashing
- Information warfare
- Lawfare
- Media manipulation
- Minor sabotage
- Special operations
- Psychological Warfare Division
- Zersetzung
- Cognitive warfare

== Bibliography ==
- Abner, Alan K. Psywarriors : psychological warfare during the Korean War (1951) online
- Holzmann, Ashley F. "Artists of War: A History of United States Propaganda, Psychological Warfare, Psychological Operations and a Proposal for Its Ever-Changing Future." US Army Command and General Staff College, 2020) online
- Linebarger, Paul M. A. Psychological Warfare: International Propaganda and Communications. ISBN 0-405-04755-X (1948). Revised second edition, Duell, Sloan and Pearce (1954).
- Pease, Stephen E. Psywar : psychological warfare in Korea, 1950-1953 (1992) online
- Roberts III, Mervyn Edwin. The Psychological War for Vietnam, 1960–1968 (2018)
- Roetter, Charles. The art of psychological warfare, 1914-1945 (1974) online
- Simpson, Christopher. Science of Coercion: Communication Research & Psychological Warfare, 1945–1960 (1994) online
- Song, Tae Eun. "Information/Psychological Warfare in the Russia-Ukraine War: Overview and Implications." IFANS FOCUS 2022.9 (May 2022): 1-4. online Archived 2023-06-21 at the Wayback Machine
- Voloshin, Nikolay, and Leyla Garaybeli. "Putin's Psychological Warfare in Ukraine and Syria" Insights of Pakistan, Iran and the Caucasus Studies 2.3 (2023): 50-54. online
- Lüdke, Tilman (17 December 2018). "Jihad, Holy War (Ottoman Empire)". International Encyclopedia of the First World War (WW1).
