= Amaury Bier =

Brazilian economist and government official

Amaury Guilherme Bier

Executive Secretary of the Ministry of Finance of Brazil
- In office March 31, 1999 – October 31, 2002
- President: Fernando Henrique Cardoso
- Minister: Pedro Malan

Executive Director of the World Bank, IFC and MIGA
- In office November 1, 2002 – January 5, 2004

Secretary of Economic Policy, Ministry of Finance
- In office 1998–1999

Chief Economist, Ministry of Planning
- In office 1996–1998

President of Gávea Investimentos
- In office 2007–2022

Personal details
- Born: 1960 (age 65–66) Warsaw, Poland
- Education: B.A. in Economics, University of São Paulo (1982); Interdisciplinary Training Program, CEBRAP (1985–1986)
- Occupation: Economist, investment manager

Amaury Guilherme Bier (born 1960) is a Brazilian economist and investment manager who served as Executive Secretary of the Ministry of Finance of Brazil from 1999 to 2002 and as Executive Director of the World Bank, International Finance Corporation (IFC), and Multilateral Investment Guarantee Agency (MIGA) from 2002 to 2004. He served as President of Gávea Investimentos from 2007 to 2022 and has been a partner responsible for private equity investments since 2014.

== Early life and education ==
Amaury Guilherme Bier was born in Warsaw, Poland, in 1960, and holds Brazilian nationality. He earned a Bachelor's degree in Economics from the School of Economics, Business and Accounting at the University of São Paulo (FEA-USP) in 1982.

He subsequently pursued graduate studies in Economics at FEA-USP from 1983 to 1985, completing coursework toward Master's and PhD degrees, though he did not defend a thesis. From 1985 to 1986, he completed the Interdisciplinary Training Program at the Brazilian Center for Analysis and Planning (CEBRAP). During this period, he also served as a professor at FEA-USP from 1985 to 1986.

== Career ==
=== Early career (1989–1996) ===
Bier began his professional career as an economist at Copersucar in 1989, followed by a position as economist at Sadia S.A. in 1990. From 1990 to 1991, he served as coordinator of Monetary and Financial Policy Coordination at the Secretariat of Economic Policy of the Ministry of Finance.

He then worked as an associate at the consulting firm Kandir & Associados from 1992 to 1994. In 1994, he joined Citibank Brazil as Chief Economist, a position he held until 1996. During his tenure at Citibank, he provided commentary on Brazilian economic policy, particularly regarding privatization efforts.

In 1996, Bier was quoted in Bloomberg News regarding Brazil's privatization of Companhia Vale do Rio Doce (CVRD), stating that the privatization would mark "the point of no return" for Brazil's move away from decades of statism.

=== Government service (1996–2002) ===
==== Ministry of Planning (1996–1998) ====
In 1996, Bier joined the Brazilian federal government as Chief Economist at the Ministry of Planning, Budget and Management, serving until 1998.

==== Ministry of Finance (1998–2002) ====
Bier joined the Ministry of Finance as Secretary of Economic Policy from 1998 to 1999. In March 1999, he was appointed Executive Secretary of the Ministry of Finance, effectively serving as Deputy Finance Minister under Pedro Malan.

As Executive Secretary, Bier was involved in Brazilian economic policy during a period that included the 1999 currency devaluation, implementation of inflation targeting, and negotiations with international financial institutions. His appointment was documented in presidential decrees signed by President Fernando Henrique Cardoso.

During his tenure, Bier participated in Brazil's privatization program from 1998 to 2002. He also served as Chairman of the Board of Directors at several major Brazilian state-owned banks, including Banco do Brasil, Caixa Econômica Federal, Banco do Estado de São Paulo (Banespa), and Banco do Nordeste.

==== International financial negotiations ====
Bier represented Brazil in international financial negotiations. In July 2002, he led a Brazilian mission to the International Monetary Fund (IMF) to negotiate during a period of currency pressure. The New York Times reported that "Brazil sent the mission, headed by Amaury Bier, a top Finance Ministry official, and Ilan Goldfajn, the central bank's economic policy director" to Washington.

His departure from government was announced in October 2002, when the Official Gazette of the Union (Diário Oficial da União) published a decree accepting his resignation from the position of Executive Secretary of the Ministry of Finance.

=== World Bank Group (2002–2004) ===
Following his government service, Bier was appointed Executive Director of the World Bank, International Finance Corporation (IFC), and Multilateral Investment Guarantee Agency (MIGA), representing Brazil and other countries from 2002 to 2003.

=== Gávea Investimentos (2004–present) ===
In 2004, Bier joined Gávea Investimentos, the investment management firm founded by former Brazilian Central Bank President Arminio Fraga. He initially served as a partner responsible for wealth management from 2004 to 2007, then as President of the company from 2007 to 2022. Since 2014, he has been a member of the Investment Committee and partner responsible for private equity investments.

==== JPMorgan acquisition (2010) ====
In 2010, JPMorgan Chase acquired a majority stake in Gávea Investimentos. Reuters reported that "Gavea will sell 55 percent of its operations, including its entire private banking unit, to the New York-based lender, Gavea partner Amaury Bier" announced. The transaction was valued at approximately $270 million.

Institutional Investor magazine reported in 2009 that "Arminio says Gávea is lucky to have Amaury Bier, a former deputy finance minister of Brazil, as CEO to handle the day-to-day administration of the firm."

==== Return to independent ownership (2016) ====
In 2016, Gávea's founders, including Bier, bought back the firm from JPMorgan, returning it to independent Brazilian ownership.

== Board positions and other activities ==
Bier has served on numerous corporate boards since 1997. He currently serves as:

- Member of the Board of Directors of Klabin S.A.
- Member of the Audit and Related Parties Committee of Klabin S.A.
- Member of the Board of Directors of ARMAC S.A.
- Member of the Board of Directors of Natural One S.A.

He has previously served on the boards of directors of major Brazilian companies and institutions, including Banco do Brasil, Caixa Econômica Federal, IRB-RE, Itaipu Binacional, Americanas, Camil, Laboratório Hermes Pardini, Grupo GPS, and Grupo São Francisco, among others.

He has also participated in economic policy discussions, including debates about fiscal responsibility legislation in the Brazilian Senate.

== Public commentary ==
Bier has provided commentary on Brazilian economic policy throughout his career. In 2015, he stated that Brazil's economic situation remained "very delicate," referencing his experience as Executive Secretary of the Ministry of Finance from 1999 to 2002.
