= New Germany =

New Germany can refer to:

== Locations ==
- New Germany, KwaZulu-Natal, South Africa
- New Germany, Minnesota, United States
- New Germany, Nova Scotia, Canada
- New Germany State Park, Maryland, United States
- New Germany, Ohio, United States

== See also ==
- Neues Deutschland (New Germany), German newspaper
- Das Neue Deutschland (The New Germany), World War II propaganda
- Nueva Germania, a district in Paraguay
