= John Rassias =

American academic

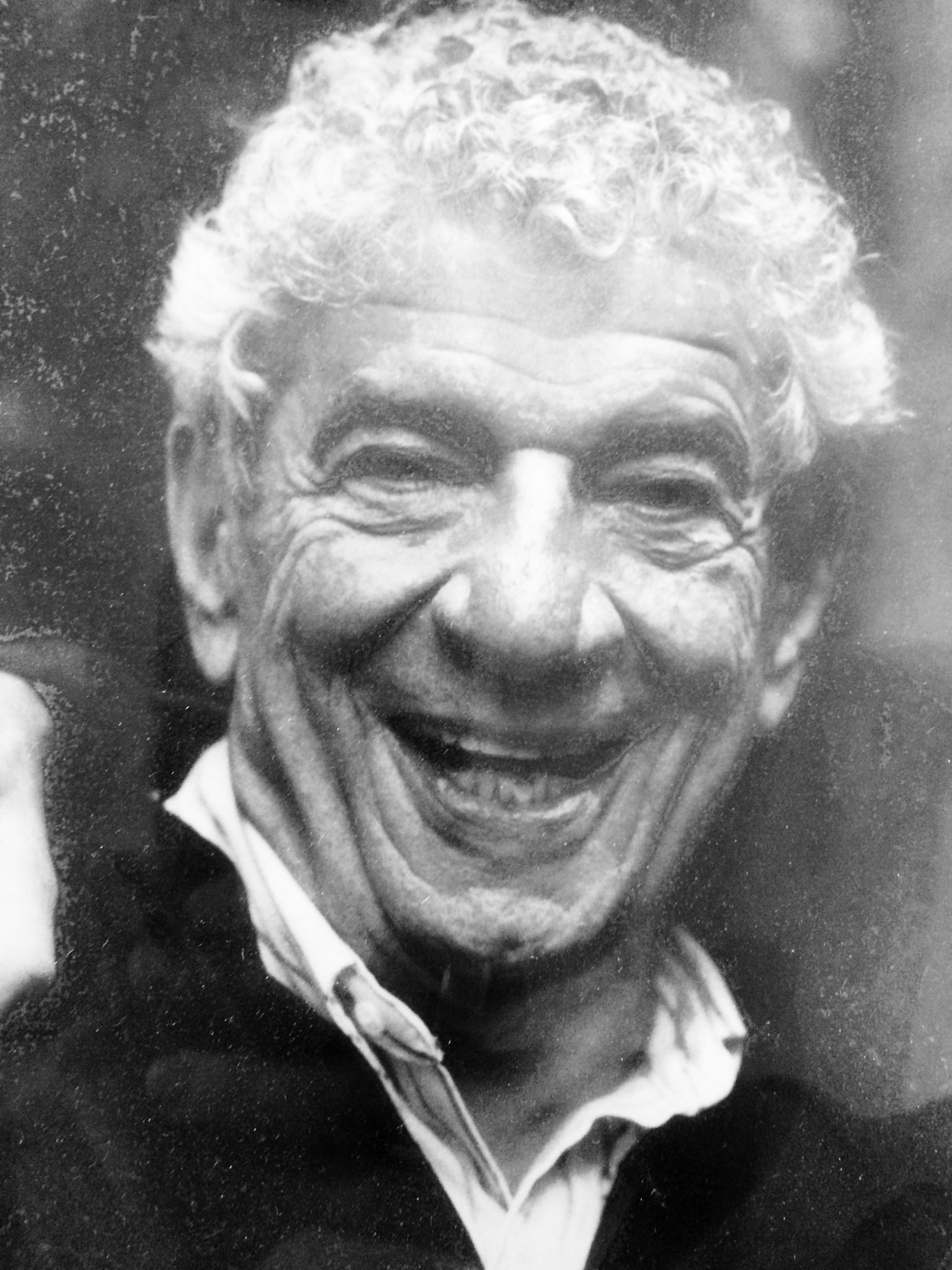
John A. Rassias, professor and creator of the Rassias Method for language instruction

John Arthur Rassias (August 20, 1925 – December 2, 2015) was an American professor who developed a method for the teaching of foreign languages, the Rassias Method, also known as the Dartmouth Intensive Language Model. John Rassias founded the Rassias Center for World Languages and Cultures, a department of Dartmouth College situated in the Office of the Provost that works with language learners and professionals from around the world.

Rassias died in Norwich, Vermont, on December 2, 2015, at the age of 90. Dartmouth College's Rassias Center for World Languages and Cultures, run by Rassias’ daughter, Helene Rassias-Miles, continues to provide language education to Dartmouth community members and learners all over the world. Dartmouth undergraduates continue to receive language instruction through the Rassias Method. Throughout his career Rassias reached a large number of students and educators around the world. Archives suggest that at date of death, his work has affected more than 200,000 Peace Corps volunteers since 1964 and continues to be fundamental in that organization’s language instruction approach. An innovative language curriculum designer, Rassias started, in the early 1980s, immersion language programs for continuing education purposes. These highly efficient 10-day summer programs have enabled adult language learners to make significant gains in their command of the oral and written foreign language in a short period of time. Some rank beginners have even been able to reach the Intermediate-Low level (ACTFL scale) during the program, an achievement which usually requires three to four semesters in college curricula. At Dartmouth and other U.S. post-secondary institutions, the Rassias Method has been used to teach more than 25,000 students in language acquisition courses. Through the Inter-American Partnership for Education (IAPE) over 1.5 million students of all ages in Mexico have been impacted by faculty trained in the Rassias Method. Finally, language learners worldwide continue to receive instruction in the method through workshops and classes offered through the Rassias Center. Since the advent of the COVID-19 pandemic, Dartmouth and the Rassias Center pivoted to a remote language platform that serves Dartmouth undergrads and the public at large.

== Early life ==
John A. Rassias was born in Manchester, New Hampshire on August 20, 1925, to Athanathios and Eleni (Leonardakis) Rassias, immigrants from Georgitsi, Greece. A WWII veteran, Rassias enlisted in the Marines, fought on Okinawa, and was part of the occupying forces. Rassias later referred to his experience in the war as important to his understanding of how cultural and linguistic understanding connects people of varying backgrounds and experiences. As Rassias states in his book To Be Human, the Unzipped Mind: "I am born in Manchester, New Hampshire, to a Greek father and Greek mother. Then some buddies and I invade Okinawa. Then I become a teacher...The war has ended... As the Occupation wears on I come into contact with more and more Japanese. Suspicion and distrust give way gradually to the need to communicate and work with them. I roam over the destroyed city (Sasebo)…The desire to understand the Japanese eventually overcomes the hate we’ve absorbed in our training and in combat, it is displaced by the simple human response of sympathy for the afflicted. For the second time in my life, language becomes the arbiter between me and others. Emotion. Learning takes place there, for nothing is real unless it touches me and I embrace it."

== Education ==
Rassias graduated summa cum laude from the University of Bridgeport, and later obtained a doctorat d’Etat at the University of Dijon, Dijon, France. He continued with further research at the Sorbonne and also studied at and performed with the Cours Réné Simon in Paris in the 1950s. Rassias also received a certificate from the Institut de Phonétique in Paris and completed additional study at Laval University in Québec.

== Work ==
In 1964 John Rassias became a consultant for Peace Corps language education programs throughout the world. He also served as Director of the first pilot program of languages for the Peace Corps in Africa and as Director of Language Programs at Dartmouth. This work initiated his development of the Rassias teaching method.

From 1965 to 2015 Rassias was William R. Kenan Professor of French and Italian at Dartmouth College, where the Rassias Center uses his method. At Dartmouth, he was the founder and director of Dartmouth’s Language Study Abroad (LSA) program, through which Dartmouth students may complete their language requirement in a foreign country.

Rassias "put the teacher in the role of the performer, acting out words and expressions in imaginary real-life settings and inculcating vocabulary and grammar through rapid-fire drills that gave students no time to think in English." He believed that every class was to be treated like the first class, and for this reason gained appreciation from his students.

In 1978 Rassias was appointed to President Jimmy Carter's Commission on Foreign Language and International Studies. In 1994, Rassias was appointed to the Commission of the Modern Language Association of America on the study of service in the profession. He was also elected to the Division of the Teaching of Literature of the Modern Language Association in 1995, which he chaired in 1998. In addition, Rassias served as a member of the Advisory Committee on Foreign Languages to the Connecticut State Board of Education.

In 1998, Rassias was appointed as head of a commission focused on preserving the Greek language among Americans of Greek heritage by the Archbishop of the Greek Orthodox Archdiocese of America.

In 2006, Rassias participated in the creation of a March 2007 pilot program for Intensive English (IE) education outside of Mexico City. This pilot program was called the Inter-American Partnership for Education (IAPE). Between 2007 and 2020 IAPE worked with thousands of Mexican teachers.

== The Rassias Method ==
The method aims to "make the participant feel comfortable and natural with the language in a short period of time" and involves "teaching procedures and dramatic techniques which seek to eliminate inhibitions and create an atmosphere of free expression from the very first day of class".

The emphasis of the Rassias Method is on spoken language while interweaving written work. All 50 techniques stress theatrical elements as well as immediate positive reinforcement and error correction.

The Rassias Method relies heavily on experience as the teacher, supporting the idea that “the best way to learn a second language is to speak it and live it.” Because of this, language instructors attempt to primarily speak in the target language in order to encourage students to participate through the new medium. Creating an environment in which the student feels comfortable being themselves allows for the maximum amount of growth opportunities. Thus, many different styles of teaching and teaching techniques are employed around the world as subsets of this method. Activities may include group work or acting out situations that a student might run into in real life.

== Personal life ==
Rassias was married to Mary Ann Evanstock (1928–2012) from 1954 to 2012 and had three children, nine grandchildren, and three great-grandchildren. He died in Norwich, Vermont, on December 2, 2015, at the age of 90.

== Awards, honors and distinctions ==
John Rassias received many awards for his work in language education, including the following:

- First Arthur Wilson Outstanding Teacher Award at Dartmouth (1968)
- E. Harris Harbison Award for Gifted Teaching by the Danforth Foundation (1971)
- Endowed Chair, William R. Kenan Professor (1977)
- Dartmouth College's Inaugural President's Medal for Outstanding Leadership and Achievement in 1991.
- Robert A. Fish Memorial Prize in Outstanding Teaching awarded by the Dean of the Faculty at Dartmouth College (1997)
- Dartmouth Class of 2008 Distinguished Teaching Award (2008)

Rassias received eight honorary degrees from the following:

- University of Bridgeport
- Alma College
- Washington University in St. Louis
- Plymouth State University
- University of Detroit
- Hampden–Sydney College
- Moravian College
- Pine Manor College

== Legacy ==
The Rassias Center, run by Rassias’ daughter, Helene Rassias-Miles, continues to provide language education to Dartmouth community members and learners all over the world. Dartmouth undergraduates continue to receive language instruction through the Rassias Method.

Throughout his career Rassias reached a large number of students and educators around the world. Archives suggest that to date, his work has affected more than 200,000 Peace Corps volunteers since 1964 and continues to be fundamental in that organization’s language instruction approach. An innovative language curriculum designer, Rassias started, in the early 1980s, immersion language programs for continuing education purposes. These highly efficient 10-day summer programs have enabled adult language learners to make significant gains in their command of the oral and written foreign language in a short period of time. Some rank beginners have even been able to reach the Intermediate-Low level (ACTFL scale) during the program, an achievement which usually requires three to four semesters in college curricula. At Dartmouth and other U.S. post-secondary institutions, the Rassias Method has been used to teach more than 25,000 students in language acquisition courses. Through the Inter-American Partnership for Education (IAPE) over 1.5 million students of all ages in Mexico have been impacted by faculty trained in the Rassias Method. Finally, language learners worldwide continue to receive instruction in the method through workshops and classes offered through the Rassias Center.
