= PDU-5B dispenser unit =

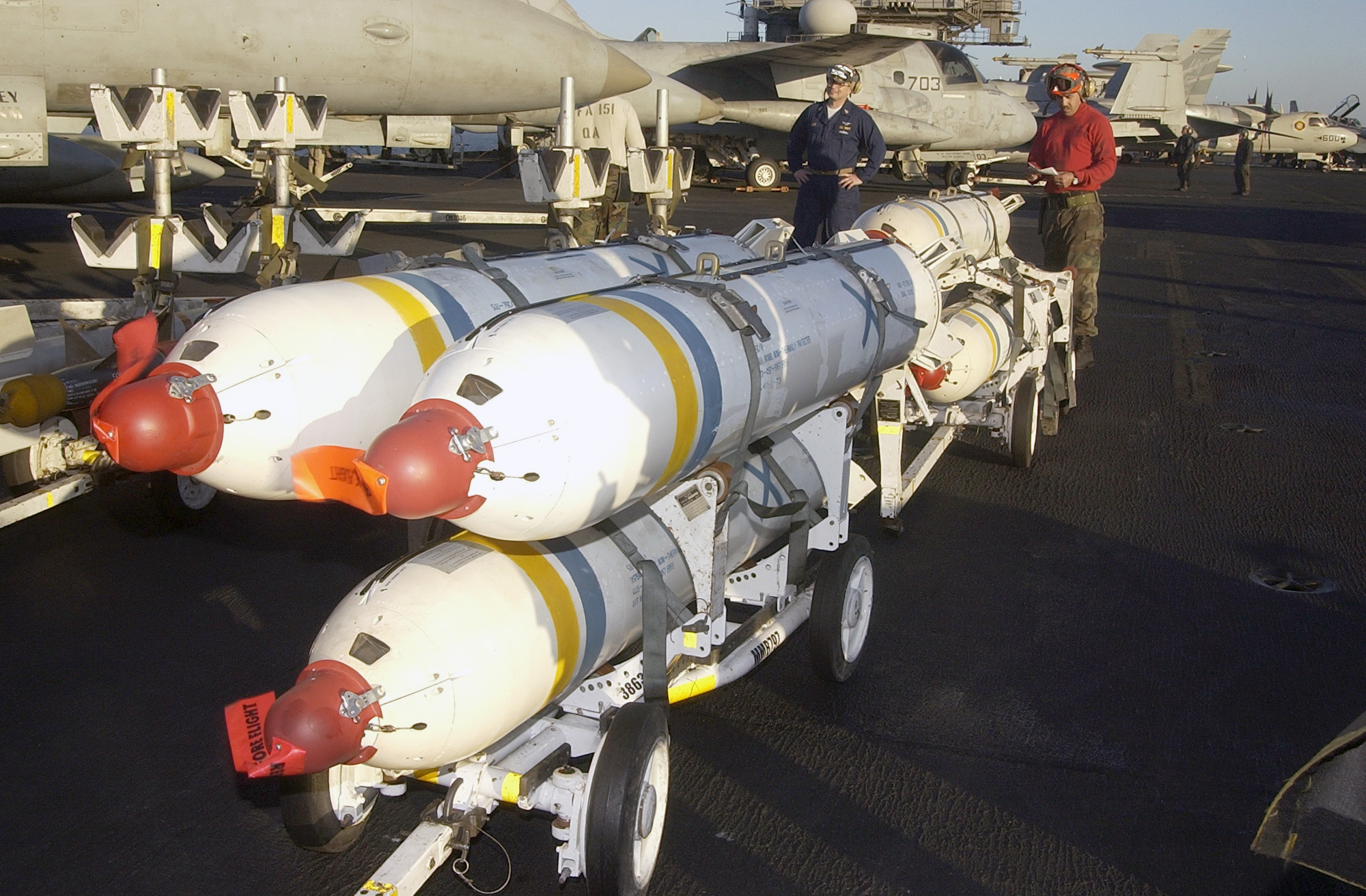
Three PDU-5 Leaflet Bombs sitting on the flight deck of an aircraft carrier.

The PDU-5/B is an aircraft-deployed leaflet dispersal unit. It is derived from the CBU-100 "Rockeye" Cluster Bomb, developed by the U.S. Air Force around 1999. It was used successfully in Afghanistan and Iraq to distribute leaflets. In 2015, it was used again to drop 60,000 leaflets near Raqqa, Syria.
