= Dartmouth College's Rassias Center for World Languages and Cultures =

Non-profit organization at Dartmouth College

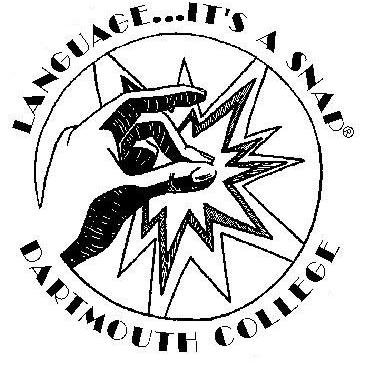
Dartmouth's Rassias Center for World Languages and Cultures is a non-profit that works to provide language education and training to students and professionals from around the world.

The Rassias Center for World Languages and Cultures is a non-profit organization operating under the Provost’s Office at Dartmouth College in Hanover, NH. The goal of the Rassias Center is “to promote cultural understanding and to strengthen communication among people around the world.”

== Founding ==
The Rassias Center was founded by John A. Rassias, William R. Kenan Professor of French and Italian at Dartmouth College. The Center was established in collaboration with the Provost’s Office in 1981. It began as a Language Outreach as a separate 501(c)(3) operating within Dartmouth College.

In 2007 The Rassias Foundation became Dartmouth College’s Rassias Center for World Languages and Cultures and was absorbed by Dartmouth as a department under the Provost’s Office.

== Programs ==
The Center’s Accelerated Language Programs (ALPs) operate every summer on the Dartmouth Campus. These 10-day immersive programs are designed to wholly engage participants in the target language. In addition, the Rassias Center runs Community Language Programs throughout the year for residents of the Connecticut River Upper Valley in New Hampshire and Vermont. The center also hosts teacher workshops and language trainings for educators and learners around the world. Currently, the Rassias Center offers the following programs:

- Teacher Workshop in the Rassias Method - A five-day workshop occurring during the month of July that familiarizes attendees with more than 50 techniques fundamental to the Method.
- ALPS (Accelerated Language Programs) on the Dartmouth College Campus during the months of June and July
- ESL in China - Short-term English teaching programs based in Beijing, China.
- IAPE (Inter-American Partnership for Education) - Teacher training opportunities and workshops across Mexico in collaboration with Worldfund.
- Community Language Programs - six to eight-week language education programs occurring three times a year (fall, winter, spring) in alignment with academic quarters at Dartmouth.

== The Rassias Method ==
A key component of the educational programs offered at the Rassias Center is the Rassias Method (RM), a teaching approach developed by John Rassias that emphasizes high response rate and elements of theatrics to get learners speaking the target language as early as possible. The emphasis of the drill sessions “is spoken language and familiarity with the culture of the country whose language is being studied. The classroom techniques involved are rapid-paced, theatrical, highly creative, imaginative, and necessitate great quantities of enthusiasm.

John Rassias began his work formalizing the RM during Dartmouth’s long affiliation with the Peace Corps summer orientation programs. The RM became part of Dartmouth College in 1967. A signature of the RM at Dartmouth is the mentoring of Assistant Teachers (ATs), who meet with students of the target language to conduct daily drills in small group sessions. Assistant Teachers are nominated by Dartmouth language professors and receive training in the method from the Rassias Center. The process involves many layers of mentorship through which the ATs receive training and guidance from the center, master teachers and professors.

== Collaborations ==
The Rassias Center works in conjunction with numerous other organizations, such as the Inter-American Partnership for Education, US China Scitach Education Promotion Association Inc., Greater Lawrence Family Help Center, and UC San Diego Center for U.S.-Mexican Studies to accomplish its mission.
