= Gávea Investimentos =

Brazilian investment management firm

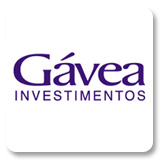
- Industry: Financial services Asset management
- Founded: August 2003
- Founder: Arminio Fraga
- Headquarters: Rio de Janeiro, Brazil
- Area served: Global
- Key people: Arminio Fraga (Founder and Chairman); Amaury Bier (Co-CIO Private Equity; CEO); Luiz Henrique Fraga (Founder and Co-CIO, Private Equity); Gabriela M Gouvea (CEO, Hedge Funds); Edward Amadeo (Senior Economist); Bernardo Carvalho (Managing Director and Chief Risk Officer)
- Products: Hedge funds Private equity Investment management
- Total assets: ▲ ~US$3 billion (2025)
- Number of employees: ~150 (2025)
- Website: www.gaveainvest.com.br

Gávea Investimentos is a Brazilian investment management firm, founded in 2003 by Arminio Fraga and Luiz Henrique Fraga. Based in Rio de Janeiro, the firm focuses on emerging markets and operates two main business areas: hedge funds and private equity. As of 2025, Gávea manages approximately US$3 billion in assets under management and has US$5.4 billion in committed capital for private equity investments.

== History ==
Gávea Investimentos was founded in August 2003 by Arminio Fraga, former president of the Central Bank of Brazil, and Luiz Henrique Fraga. The firm launched its first two investment products in August 2003.

During its first seven years, Gávea developed operations in both hedge fund strategies and private equity investments, with a focus on emerging markets. By 2010, the company was managing approximately $6 billion in hedge and private equity funds.

In November 2010, Gávea announced the sale of a majority stake to J.P. Morgan Asset Management, the asset management arm of JPMorgan Chase. The transaction created an alliance with Highbridge Capital Management, JPMorgan's alternative asset manager. The deal was valued at approximately $270 million and gave JPMorgan a 55% stake in the firm.

In 2016, Gávea's founders bought back the firm from JPMorgan, returning it to independent ownership.

== Operations ==
Gávea maintains offices in Rio de Janeiro and São Paulo, with approximately 150 employees as of 2025. The firm's headquarters are located at 1100 Av. Ataulfo de Paiva in Rio de Janeiro.

The Gávea Group comprises multiple entities:

- Gávea Investimentos - Main investment management firm
- Gávea Equity - Equity-focused investment entity
- Gávea DTVM - Securities distribution company

These entities are regulated by the Central Bank of Brazil, the Brazilian Securities and Exchange Commission (CVM), and the Brazilian Financial and Capital Markets Association (ANBIMA).

=== Hedge funds ===
Gávea's hedge fund business focuses on emerging markets with a global investment approach. The firm employs macro and micro analysis strategies. The hedge fund division has invested in over 25 countries.

As of 2025, the firm has adjusted its investment focus in response to market volatility. Gávea now prioritizes international and macroeconomic matters.

=== Private equity ===
The private equity division focuses on minority investments. As of 2025, Gávea has US$5.4 billion in committed capital for private equity investments, with 57 investments and 53 divestments completed.

Recent investments include participation in the acquisition of assets from Agrícola Veneto by Natural One in July 2024.
