= Arminio Fraga =

Brazilian economist

Armínio Fraga
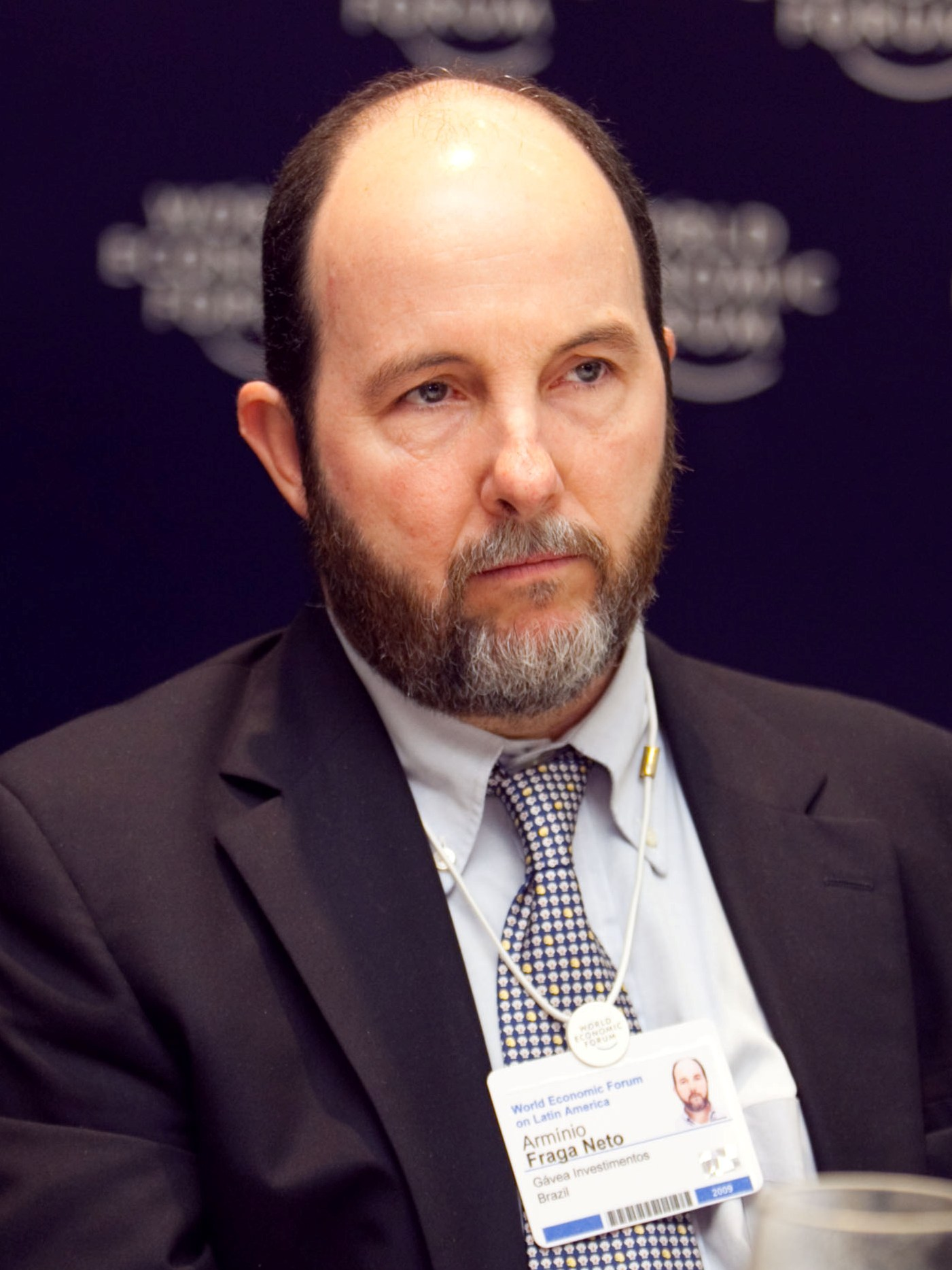
- Fraga at the World Economic Forum on Latin America in 2009.

President of the Central Bank
- In office 4 March 1999 – 1 January 2003
- President: Fernando Henrique Cardoso
- Preceded by: Gustavo Franco
- Succeeded by: Henrique Meirelles

Personal details
- Born: 20 July 1957 (age 69) Rio de Janeiro, Brazil
- Education: Pontifical Catholic University of Rio de Janeiro; Princeton University

Armínio Fraga Neto (born 20 July 1957, in Rio de Janeiro) is a Brazilian economist who was president of the Central Bank of Brazil from 1999 to 2003. From 1993 until his appointment to the Central Bank, he was Managing Director of Soros Fund Management in New York. Since 2001, he has been a member of the influential Washington-based financial advisory body, the Group of Thirty.

== Education ==
Fraga received his PhD in economics from Princeton University in 1985.

== Career ==
In 2003, he founded the Rio de Janeiro based investment company, Gávea Investimentos.

Fraga has been called the Alan Greenspan of Latin America for his skillful handling of Brazilian monetary policy during his tenure as CBB president.

Fraga worked for both Fernando Henrique Cardoso governments.

In 2009, Fraga served on the High Level Commission on the Modernization of World Bank Group Governance, which – under the leadership of Ernesto Zedillo – conducted an external review of the World Bank Group's governance.

In October 2010, Gávea Investimentos was acquired by Highbridge Capital Management, a subsidiary of J.P. Morgan Asset Management.

== Other activities ==
=== Corporate boards ===
- China Investment Corporation, member of the international advisory council (since 2009)

=== Non-profit organizations ===
- Council on Foreign Relations, member
- Group of Thirty (G30), member
- Columbia Global Center Rio de Janeiro, member of the advisory board (since 2013)
- Princeton University, member of the board of trustees (2018–2019)

Government offices
Preceded by Gustavo Franco	President of the Central Bank of Brazil; 1999–2003	Succeeded by Henrique Meirelles
