= Worldfund =

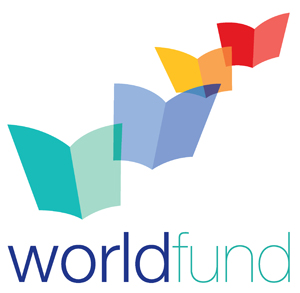
- Founded: 2002
- Founder: Luanne Zurlo
- Purpose: Education
- Headquarters: New York, New York
- Region served: Latin America
- Method: Donations, Grants and Partnerships

The World Education and Development Fund, doing business initially as Worldfund and later as Educando by Worldfund is a non-profit organization founded in 2002 that delivers training and ongoing support educators from underserved schools in Latin America. In that time, it has operated 3 leadership and in-service professional development programs for educators in Latin America: IAPE, for English teachers in Mexico; STEM Brasil and STEM Mexico, for science and math teachers; and LISTO, for school directors in Mexico. Nearly 8,000 principals and teachers have participated in Worldfund programming.

== IAPE ==
The Inter-American Partnership for Education (IAPE) trained, empowered, and supported a network of English language educators in Mexico's most underserved public schools, in association with Dartmouth College's Rassias Center. IAPE operated from 2007 until the outset of the global COVID-19 pandemic in 2020.

=== Impact by 2020 ===
- Launch year: 2007
- Number of states: 32/32
- Number of educators: over 2,600
- Number of students: over 3 million

== STEM Brasil ==
This program addresses the urgent increasing need for professionals in the fields of science, technology, engineering, and math. The STEM Brasil methodology complements the school curriculum. The program engages students with their own teachers during the school day, unlike extracurricular programs.

=== Impact by 2017 ===
- Launch year: 2009
- Number of states: 16/30
- Number of educators: 3,900
- Number of students: 500,000

=== Evaluation Results ===
- 85% of participating schools showed an increase of over 20% in Math scores
- 74% of school administrators noticed an increase in teacher motivation and 88% positive changes in teacher behavior

== STEM Mexico ==
Worldfund is currently developing the infrastructure to implement its STEM program within Mexico's public schools. Anticipated launch date is 2018.

== Areas of Operation ==
=== Mexico ===
- México
- Ciudad de México
- Veracruz
- Jalisco
- Puebla
- Guanajuato
- Chiapas
- Nuevo León
- Michoacán
- Oaxaca
- Chihuahua
- Guerrero
- Tamaulipas
- Baja California
- Sinaloa
- Coahuila de Zaragoza
- Hidalgo
- Sonora
- San Luis Potosí
- Tabasco
- Yucatán
- Querétaro de Arteaga
- Morelos
- Durango
- Zacatecas
- Quintana Roo
- Aguascalientes
- Tlaxcala
- Nayarit
- Campeche
- Baja California Sur
- Colima

=== Brazil ===
- Acre
- Amapá
- Espírito Santo
- Goiás
- Maranhão
- Mato Grosso
- Mato Grosso do Sul
- Paraíba
- Pernambuco
- Rio de Janeiro
- Rio Grande do Norte
- Rio Grande do Sul
- Rondônia
- São Paulo
- Sergipe
- Tocantins
