= Morazanist Patriotic Front =

Honduran militia

- Frente Patriótico Morazanista
- Dates active: 1980s–1995
- Country: Honduras
- Ideology: Anti-imperialism; Left-wing terrorism
- Political position: Far-left

Morazanist Patriotic Front (FPM, Spanish: Frente Patriótico Morazanista) was a paramilitary group operating in Honduras. It is considered a radical, leftist terrorist group by United States. Its aim was to limit United States involvement in Honduras economic and political affairs. The Nicaraguan government is believed to have had ties to the FPM.

== History ==
The group first appeared in the late 1980s.

The group claimed the responsibility for - the bombing of Peace Corps office in December 1988, bombing of a bus near Comayagua on 19 February 1989, attack on US convoy in April 1989, La Ceiba grenade attack in July 1989. attack on a bus in March 1990.

In May 1991, even after top leaders of the Cinchoneros ended armed struggle, the group vowed to continue armed struggle.

On 2 December 1991, in San Pedro SuIa, Cerveceria Hondurena brewery which was owned by the U.S. firm Castle and Cooke was attacked using a RPG-7. Damage were estimated to be at $1 million. FPM claimed responsibility.

On 5 April 1995, FPM claimed responsibility for a leaflet propaganda bomb in Tegucigalpa. This was FPM's last attack. The group is not longer considered active.
