= Niels Meyn =

Niels Gustav Meyn (11 December 1891, Copenhagen – 15 April 1957, Gentofte) was a Danish known for his contributions to children's literature, science fiction, non-fiction, and crime fiction. Meyn published under more than 30 pseudonyms, with notable examples including George Griffith, Harold Chester, Rex Nelson, David Gartner, Gustav Hardner, and his most widely recognized and frequently used alias, Charles Bristol. These pseudonyms allowed him to release his stories at the rapid pace he produced them. Including his numerous pulp-fiction works, Meyn authored over 300 crime stories.

During World War II, Meyn was a Nazi sympathizer. In 1940, he joined the National Socialist Workers' Party of Denmark and contributed to their daily publication, Fædrelandet.

== Literary career ==
Meyn made his debut in 1910, the same year he completed his schooling, with a short story published in the newspaper Hjemmet. In 1911, he began a degree in natural sciences, which he never completed. That same year, he co-authored his first novel, Med Luftskib til Mars, with August Klingsey. His first solo novel, Rejsen til Venus, was published in 1915.

Before becoming a professional fiction writer, Meyn briefly worked for the East Asiatic Company and, from 1917 to 1919, for Politikens lejebibliotek. As a journalist, he wrote hundreds of articles for various publications, focusing primarily on popular science topics.

Meyn began his career as a translator for Litteraturselskabet in the early 1900s. However, he quickly realized that writing his own stories was faster than translating those of others. This discovery paved his way into the thriving pulp fiction industry of the early 20th century. Meyn contributed to many of Litteraturselskabet's series, which otherwise primarily featured translations.

At times, when in need of money, Meyn sold story ideas to others, leaving them to complete the writing. While he primarily wrote for financial reasons, he was not without literary ambitions. However, he never achieved recognition as a literary author, as popular literature in Denmark was largely dismissed and looked down upon, at least until the early 1980s.

Lord Kingsley and Fyrst Basil were among Meyn's earliest contributions to the crime genre. Later, he wrote for several prominent Danish pulp fiction magazines, often using the pseudonym Peter Anker. His contributions included series such as Betjent Ole Ny, Kurt Danner, and Styrmand Rasmussen. Most notable was his own series, Mystiske Mr. X., which was published in multiple installments.

Meyn also wrote longer novels, publishing them under various pseudonyms, including Gustav Hardner, Harold Chester, and Richard Ørn. While crime novels of the time often focused on logical deduction, scientific elements, or the moral struggles of hardboiled private detectives, Meyn frequently incorporated motifs from adventure stories. Despite this divergence, his novels often displayed greater depth and substance compared to the more formulaic detective stories commonly found in magazines.

The aspect of Meyn's writing he valued most was his books about animals. These works, though fictional, were grounded in a thorough understanding of animal behavior. They were widely published across Scandinavia, with some translated into German and released in Germany and Austria.

During the first half of the 1900s, most Danish and Swedish children likely read something by Niels Meyn. When writing for girls, he used pseudonyms such as Anne Lykke and Christel Marner. For boys, he primarily wrote under the names Charles Bristol, Erik Juul, or Kai Lynres. Meyn's books for boys, which made up the majority of his work, often combined elements of adventure and the fantastical.

In many ways, Meyn held a more prominent position in Sweden than in his native Denmark. In Sweden, John Lorén published many of his stories, including most of the Jack Lester series, in Alibimagasinet. Meyn's death in 1957 was mentioned in several Swedish newspapers, but hardly at all in Denmark. John Lorén's obituary described Meyn as "a brilliant writer," adding that "through his Jack Lester novels, which we had the privilege to publish, he has been greatly appreciated by our readers."

== Nazi sympathies ==
Meyn joined the National Socialist Workers' Party of Denmark in 1940 and became an employee of their daily Fædrelandet. His literary contribution to National Socialist Danish literature, however, is rather modest. Although his work is not extensive, individual stories in the DNSAP's Maanedsbreve clearly reflect National Socialist influences. For example, the short story Elfenbensviften is, both structurally and thematically, one of the purest examples of trends in Danish National Socialist literature.

Meyn came into conflict with the party towards the end of the war and subsequently withdrew.

== Personal life ==
Meyn's father was a pharmacist and an operations manager at the Carlsberg Brewery. His mother was an officer's daughter from the German family von Kohl. Meyn had a son, Hans Ole Nissen Weller, with Ebba Lili (Mickey) Weller, but he was never married and was not officially listed as Ole's father. However, he maintained contact with his son throughout his life.

== Pseudonyms used by Niels Meyn ==
- Peter Anker
- Ellinor Bell
- Patricia Bennett
- Mary Bright
- Charles Bristol
- Harold Chester
- Dick Danner
- Jan Dorph
- Phil Farwest
- John D. Forster
- Davis Gartner
- George Griffith
- Mary Hamilton
- Gustav Harder
- Carl Hardner
- Gustav Hardner
- Lisa Hill
- Richard H. Hill
- Richard M. Hill
- Else Jensen
- Erik Juul
- Ole Klindt
- Anne Lykke
- Kai Lynæs
- John Marling
- Christel Marner
- Ann Marshall
- Jan Miller
- James Morris
- Jens Munk
- Nikolaj Møller
- Rex Nelson
- David Parker
- Ruth Parker
- Andreas Rasmussen
- Robert Sterling
- Erik Tønder
- Lili Werner
- Richard Ørn

== Sources ==
- Niels Meyn-biografi, accessed 2012-08-05
- Per Hougaard, "Om knaldromaner, føljetoner og kolportagelitteratur i Danmark", s. 7-37 i: Lotte Philipson m.fl. (red.), Bøger, samlinger, historier - En antologi, Det Kongelige Bibliotek, 1999. ISBN 87-7023-063-3.
- Ole Ravn, Dansk nationalsocialistisk litteratur 1930-1945, Berlingske Forlag, 1979, s. 246–250.
