= Operation Cornflakes =

Military operation

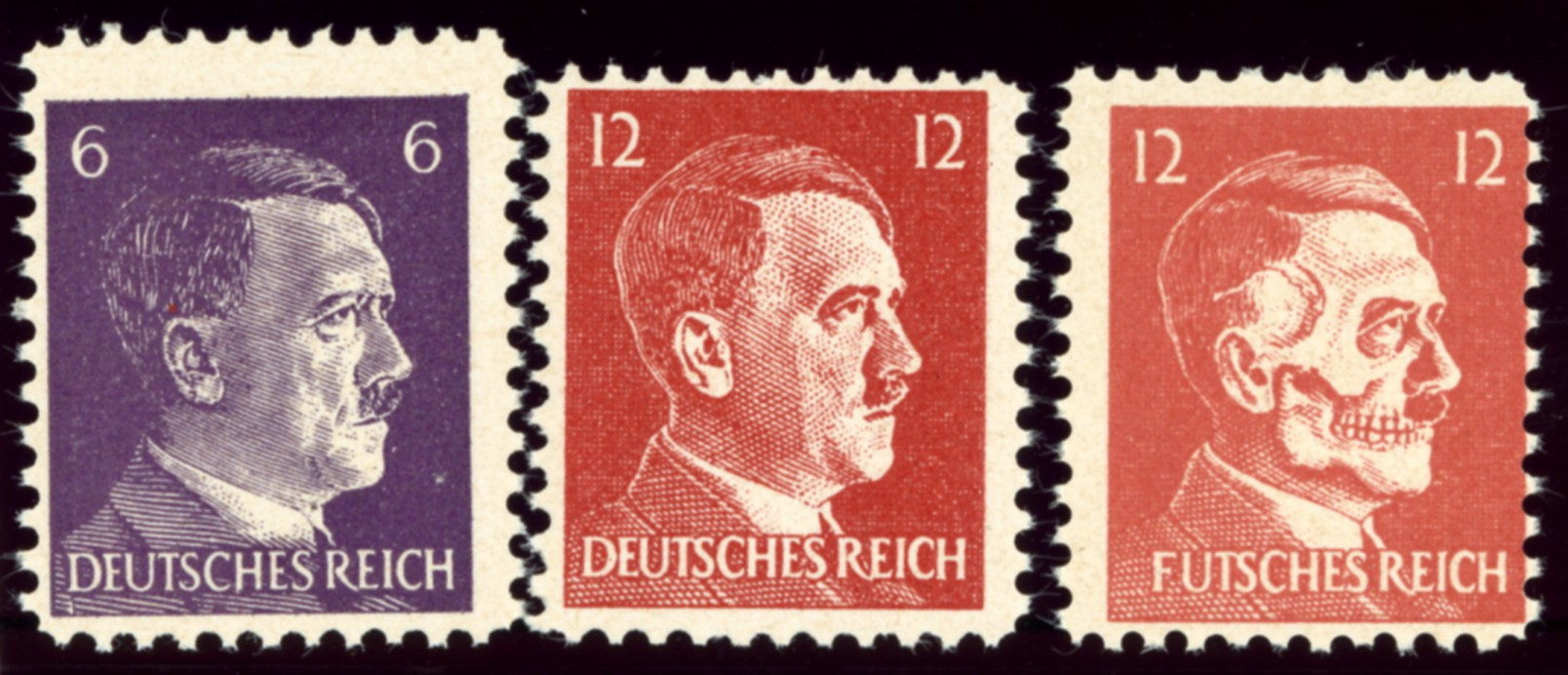
The original text Deutsches Reich ('German Empire') was maintained for the standard forgeries, but was changed to Futsches Reich ('Ruined Empire') on the "Death Head" variant, a focus of American forgers

Operation Cornflakes was a morale operation by the Office of Strategic Services during World War II that aimed to trick Deutsche Reichspost into inadvertently delivering anti-Nazi propaganda to German citizens through mail.

The operation involved special planes that were instructed to airdrop bags of false, but properly addressed, mail in the vicinity of bombed mail trains. When recovering the mail during clean-up of the wreck, the postal service would hopefully confuse the false mail for genuine mailbags and deliver it to the various addresses.

== Stamp forgeries ==
The British were the first to forge the Hitler head stamp in 3, 4, 6 and 8-pfennig values from 1941 until the end of the war. These stamps were of better quality versus the Americans' attempt at forgery because the British used actual stamp production facilities whereas the Americans did not have access to quality ingredients such as paper, ink or engravers. The American forgeries focused much of their efforts on the 12-pfennig stamp depicting Hitler's head and exposed skull.

== Overview ==
Initiated in 1942, the Office of Strategic Services (OSS) was formed from the division of the Foreign Information Service (FIS) and the Office of the Coordinator of Information (COI), a division that President Franklin D. Roosevelt enacted by Executive order 9128. The remainder of the COI was renamed the Office of Strategic Services. The newly formed OSS was under jurisdiction of the Joint Chief of Staff, giving the OSS the capability and status of a military branch.

The overarching goal of the operation was to disrupt the morale of the German people by using a large scale psychological warfare operation (PSYOP) that the British MI6 had been pushing into service with the help of the Royal Air Force (RAF). Using the same pattern of mission as a previous OSS operation in Hungary, the OSS crafted their more intricate Operation Cornflakes. The distribution of propaganda in letters and distributed by the German postal system was thought to be an ideal method of reaching the German population and undermining support for Hitler.

Operation Cornflakes began with OSS officials collecting any and all German prisoners of war (POWs) that had experience with the Reichspost (Germany's postal service). These POWs were given better meals in exchange for information in collection, sorting, canceling and delivery of the mail. The OSS did not infiltrate Germany directly because they felt it necessary to focus their efforts in the liberation of France in 1944, but by the waning years of the war secret Intelligence agents of the OSS could be found trickling in. The information came from nearby outposts in neutral countries that supplied the OSS with information.

With this information the OSS and German exiles scoured the telephone directories and pulled over two million, randomly selected names registered within the Reich to send forged letters to. A unit of the OSS in Rome claimed to have forged over 15,000 envelopes a week. The letters contained writings about family happenings and gossip about non-existent people, the idea being that the domestic mail was not censored unlike the business mail. Forged letters from Rome were addressed and sealed in Siena, then went to Rome where they were placed into counterfeit mail bags which were sent to Bari to be routed and canceled, then delivered to surrounding cities.

In hopes of further shaking the morale of the German people, the OSS called upon master forgers similar in nature as MI6 once had. Rather than having an image of Heinrich Himmler replacing Hitler, the OSS used a stamp of Hitler with some minor modifications. The modifications included a skull overlay that resembles a portion of Hitler's face having been "eaten away". The German subscript at the bottom of the stamp was altered from 'Deutsches Reich' (German Empire) to 'Futsches Reich' (ruined empire). These stamps were known as the "Death Head" and were usually placed in the letter with other subversive materials.

The letters were arranged in Reichspost bags that the OSS had forged to resemble the original bags. These precisely-made bags were indistinguishable from the real German mail bags and were mimicked down to the material used. The bags were loaded aboard bombs specially designed to deploy the bags near a destroyed train, preferably one carrying mail, and drop the forgeries in amongst the originals in hope that they would be put into circulation with the rest of the mail. However, all the prior planning was almost for naught after the Reichspost altered the cancellation machines used for domestic mail in August 1944, making the thousands of letters previously written void.

The OSS obtained a copy of the revised cancellation design and went to work again drafting up new letters and with the letters, subversive material. By September the next blow to the OSS operation was intelligence gathered that no domestic mail would be delivered due to wartime internal power struggle within Germany. One page newspaper leaflets called Das Neue Deutschland which contained material that the official newspaper would never print were placed into some of the outgoing letters to be dropped by the 15th Air Force. The 15th Air Force and fighter group detachment were tasked with the destruction of the mail train and the planting of the mailbags of propaganda (Cornflakes) amongst the debris.

The first mission of Operation Cornflakes took place on 5 January 1945, when a mail train to Linz was bombed. Bags containing a total of about 3,800 propaganda letters were dropped at the site of the wreck, which were subsequently picked up and delivered to Germans by the postal service. Within 1944–45 twenty missions had been completed, reporting a success rate of 50%, leaving the 15th Air Force with over 320 delivered mailbags of propaganda.

A total of 96,000 stamps were made for Operation Cornflakes. It is unknown how many were sent, but it is believed that the "Death Head" stamps were never posted.

== Aftermath ==
A major oversight by the OSS and its task force in Rome was that the ravages of war shut down many of the cities' critical services and in some cases the postal service. While some cities continued its services of mail delivery, the allied bombing had turned many residences into piles of rubble; millions of people without a home were displaced and forced to leave and seek refuge elsewhere, in many cases with relatives. Without a physical address left to deliver the mail to, much of it was discarded. Another oversight was simply the fact that when people received mail from an unknown source they would usually destroy it, especially if the letters contained allied propaganda, either out of loyalty or fear of punishment.

== See also ==
- The Death of Adolf Hitler
- Morale Operations Branch – OSS branch specializing in psychological warfare
