= Arcos Dorados Holdings =

Public company operating McDonald's chains

Arcos Dorados Holdings Inc.
- Type: Public
- Traded as: NYSE: ARCO
- Industry: Food
- Founded: August 3, 2007; 19 years ago
- Headquarters: Montevideo, Uruguay
- Number of locations: 4.522 restaurants (2021)
- Area served: Latin America and the Caribbean
- Key people: Marcelo Rabach (CEO) Woods Staton (Executive Chairman)
- Revenue: ▲US$ 2.65 billion (2021)
- Operating income: ▲US$ 139.5 million (2021)
- Net income: ▲US$ 45.48 million (2021)
- Total assets: ▲US$ 2.36 billion (2021)
- Number of employees: 81,256 (2021)
- Website: arcosdorados.com

Arcos Dorados Holdings (English: Golden Arches Holdings) is the master franchise of the fast food restaurant chain McDonald's in 20 countries and territories across Latin America and the Caribbean. As of October 2024, it operates nearly 2,400 restaurants, making it the largest independent McDonald's franchisee in the world and the largest quick-service restaurant (QSR) chain in Latin America and the Caribbean, serving over 4.3 million customers daily.

The company generates revenue through sales from company-operated restaurants and rental income from franchised restaurants. The rental income is structured as either a flat fee or a percentage of sales, depending on which is higher. As of June 30, 2024, Arcos Dorados employs more than 100,000 individuals across its operations.

In terms of market presence, Arcos Dorados represented approximately 6.7% of McDonald's franchised restaurants globally as of its last reporting period. A new 20-year master franchise agreement with McDonald's is set to take effect on January 1, 2025. This agreement includes a royalty structure starting at 6% for the first ten years, increasing incrementally thereafter.

== Business areas ==
Arcos Dorados' territory includes Argentina, Aruba, Brazil, Chile, Colombia, Costa Rica, Curaçao, Ecuador, French Guiana, Guadeloupe, Martinique, Mexico, Panama, Peru, Puerto Rico, St. Croix, St. Thomas, Trinidad and Tobago, Uruguay and Venezuela. The company dedicated itself as the organizer of the 2014 FIFA World Cup to provide customer service training to more than 15,000 World Cup volunteers.

== History ==
McDonald's first restaurant in this region was in Puerto Rico in 1967. Since then, McDonald's expanded its presence across the region, opening its first stores in Costa Rica in 1970, in Panama in 1971, in Brazil in 1979, in Mexico and Venezuela in 1985, and in Argentina in 1986. Arcos Dorados (Spanish for "golden arches") was formed on August 3, 2007, as a result of the acquisition of McDonald's Corporation's Latin American business by the region's operations managers. Prior to the acquisition, Woods Staton, Arcos Dorados' Chairman, CEO, and controlling shareholder, was the joint venture partner of McDonald's in Argentina for more than 20 years and also served as President of McDonald's South Latin America division from 2004 until the acquisition. Arcos Dorados announced its initial public offering and became a publicly traded company on April 14, 2011, after listing its shares on the New York Stock Exchange (NYSE).

== Operations ==
With nearly $3.8 billion in sales in 2012, Arcos Dorados represents 5.6 percent of McDonald's global sales. In Latin America and the Caribbean, it is the largest fast-food chain and is more than three times the size of its closest competitor. Compared to the US, Latin America has fewer McDonald's per person. There's one McDonald's for every 22,200 citizens in the United States. In Mexico, Costa Rica, and Panama there's one restaurant for every 254,000 citizens; in Brazil, there's one for every 310,700 citizens; and in the rest of South America, there's one for every 317,400 citizens.

=== Company-operated and franchised restaurants ===
Arcos Dorados operates its McDonald's-branded restaurants under two structures: company-operated restaurants and franchised restaurants. Arcos Dorados owns, manages and operates approximately 75 percent of its restaurants. Restaurants operated and managed by franchisees account roughly for the remaining 25% of affiliated locations. They receive technical and operational support from Arcos Dorados, including training programs, operations manuals, access to its supply and distribution network, and marketing assistance.

=== McCafé locations and Dessert Centers ===
Launched in 1999, the McCafé concept is meant to attract new customers, particularly during breakfast and after lunch, in separate areas within restaurants where customers can buy lattes, cappuccinos, mochas, hot and iced premium coffees and hot chocolate. As of 2021, there were 298 McCafé locations in Latin America. "Dessert Centers", operate separately from existing restaurants, offering traditional McDonald's desserts like the McFlurry and soft-serve ice cream. As of 2021, there were 3,265 Dessert Centers in Latin America. The first Dessert Center opened in Costa Rica in 1986.

=== Reimaging ===
Arcos Dorados has been updating its McDonald's restaurants throughout the region. Between 2010 and 2012, more than 260 restaurants were fully renovated with larger gathering areas, warmer colors, contemporary furniture, artwork, large windows and often have outdoor space with tables and umbrellas for outdoor dining.

== Menu ==
Arcos Dorados' menus feature the same core items as McDonald's throughout the world, including hamburgers, fries, salads, and chicken sandwiches, but also include foods unique to the region. A few examples include a flan-like dessert in Peru, dulce de leche desserts in Argentina and Uruguay, and the McMolletes (English muffin with refried beans, cheese, and salsa) in Mexico. A typical menu includes three tiers of options: affordable entry-level options, such as the Big Pleasures, Small Prices, or "Combo del Día" ("Daily Extra Value Meal") offerings; core menu options, such as the Big Mac, Happy Meal and Quarter Pounder; and premium options, such as Big Tasty or Angus premium hamburgers and chicken sandwiches.

=== Nutrition and well-being ===
In 2011, Arcos Dorados launched a new Happy Meal, with reduced sodium, calorie and fat totals. All Happy Meal combinations in Latin America contain less than 600 calories – less than one-third of the daily calorie intake recommended for children by the World Health Organization. Also in 2011, sodium in buns, McNuggets, cheese and ketchup were reduced by an average of 10 percent. Arcos Dorados was the first restaurant chain in Latin America to publish all its calorie content in its restaurant boards in 2013. In-store, Arcos Dorados locations advertises its nutritional information in all restaurants on posters near the counter, and on paper mats that line the meal trays. Full nutritional information on every food item is available on its website.

== Advertising and promotion ==
Through McDonald's, Arcos Dorados sponsors several global sporting events such as the Olympic Games and the FIFA World Cup 2014 in Brazil. The company uses similar advertising and in-store campaigns as McDonald's locations in the United States like running the McDonald's Monopoly campaign in many countries in Latin America, including Chile, Argentina, and Brazil. McDonald's has been criticized by advocacy groups to end advertising and marketing to children. In 2008, Arcos Dorados implemented McDonald's Children's Marketing Global Guidelines which stipulate that the company communicate balanced food choices that fit within a child's nutritional needs; use its licensed characters and properties to encourage physical activity, and promote balanced food choices for children; instill positive messages about well-being, body, mind, and spirit; provide national information to help parents and families make informed choices, and engage third parties to help guide its efforts.

== Employees ==
Arcos Dorados Holdings is one of the largest employers in Latin America, employing over 100,000 individuals across its operations. This workforce is predominantly composed of young people, with approximately 90% of employees being under the age of 24, reflecting the company's commitment to providing first job opportunities in the region. The company has established a comprehensive training program that emphasizes personal and professional development. McDonald's University plays a pivotal role in this initiative, offering training to restaurant managers, mid-managers, and owners/operators on best practices in restaurant and people management, sales, marketing, and accounting. In addition to these managerial programs, there are various training curriculums available for employees seeking advancement within the company. Since its inception, more than 52,000 individuals from across Latin America have participated in McDonald's University courses and educational activities.

In April 2012, Arcos Dorados became one of the first companies to join the New Employment Opportunities (NEO) Program, developed by the Inter-American Development Bank and the International Youth Foundation. This program aims to enhance youth employability in the region, particularly among poor and low-income young people. Corporate participation in this initiative involves an initial investment of $37 million in cash and in-kind resources to support job entry and training for disadvantaged youth. Arcos Dorados has also launched additional educational initiatives such as MCampus Comunidade, which provides free access to educational resources for all members of society. This platform has attracted over 40,000 registrants, offering courses on various topics including personal finance, digital marketing, and emotional intelligence. Overall, Arcos Dorados continues to play a crucial role in fostering employment opportunities and professional development for young people in Latin America while maintaining its status as a leading employer in the region.

== Charity ==
One of Arcos Dorados' major charitable causes is the Ronald McDonald House Charities (RMHC). As of 2021, there were 67 Ronald McDonald House Charities programs in 13 countries in Latin America and the Caribbean. This includes 30 Ronald McDonald Houses; 35 Ronald McDonald Family Rooms, and 2 Ronald McDonald Care Mobile, which was built to deliver pediatric care services to remote locations. McHappy Day, McDonald's global fundraiser for RMHC, raises money for various children's causes, including the Ronald McDonald House Charities Foundation, through proceeds from the sales of Big Macs. In 2021, McHappy Day in Latin America raised nearly $6 million for RMHC.

== Environmental and social responsibility ==
=== Sustainable food sourcing ===
Globally, McDonald's has worked with animal welfare expert Temple Grandin since the mid-1990s to help ensure animals in the supply chain are properly cared for. McDonald's is currently in discussion with its pork suppliers to explore ways to phase out gestation stalls for pigs and is working with producers and suppliers to develop traceability systems to prove that the meat it buys is not from farms that use gestation stalls. McDonald's became a member of the Global Roundtable for Sustainable Beef (GRSB) in 2012. The group is working to advance the sustainable production of beef through the commitment of stakeholders in the beef value chain.

=== Supply chain ===
All of Arcos Dorado's food and paper suppliers comply with McDonald's Supplier Workplace Accountability policy, which stipulates that workers are compensated and treated fairly, work in safe conditions and produce high-quality foods and packaging. Arcos Dorados also surveys and audits its suppliers in Latin America and the Caribbean to ensure their operations meet McDonald's quality, health and safety standards. based on globally recognized, established industry standards including the International Organization for Standardization (ISO), the British Retail Consortium (BRC), and the Hazard Analysis Critical Control Plan (HACCP).

=== Reducing consumption ===
McDonald's restaurants use a significant amount of energy, specifically in cold storage to protect food safety. During the past several years, Arcos Dorados implemented a restaurant maintenance strategy to reduce water consumption, energy utilization where possible, and waste reduction at its restaurants. As one example, the company developed a collection and storage system for the water generated through condensation from the air conditioning equipment. They used the collected water to clean external areas and to water plants, reducing daily water consumption at one restaurant in Brazil from 8,000 liters to 6,800 liters.
