= Le Courrier de l'Air =

French-language propaganda newspaper during the First World War

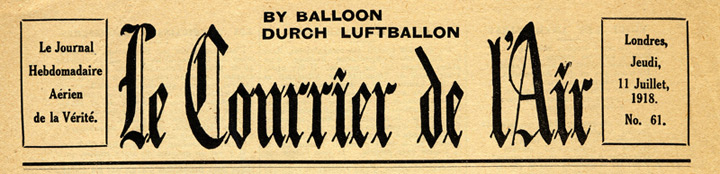
Header of Le Courrier de l’Air

Le Courrier de l'Air was a French-language propaganda newspaper distributed as a leaflet during the First World War. It was printed in London and dropped from hydrogen-filled, free-floating paper balloons on the Western Front over France and Belgium. The newspaper was the product of a division of the British Military Intelligence Service, known as MI7b. The first issue appeared on April 6, 1917. A propaganda magazine of the same name was also used by the British side against Germany during the Second World War.

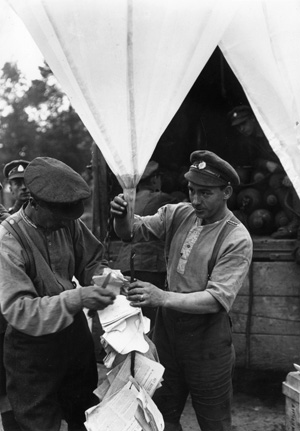
Preparation for a balloon launch with attached propaganda material

The aim of the newspaper was to provide the residents of the occupied territories with accurate information about the course of the war from an Allied perspective. In addition, texts were printed from documents that had been suppressed by the German side because they would have left a negative impression, such as reports of German defeats and losses. This was also intended to indoctrinate German front line soldiers. The average number of copies of the newspaper delivered each week was 5000 pieces.

The newspapers were first grouped in bundles of 100 copies each and then fixed at small spacings to a kind of fuse attached to the balloon. Before releasing the balloons, the fuse was lit and then slowly burned down. Little by little, the individual fastenings of the bundles came loose and more and more newspapers were released. Within about 30 minutes approximately 2000 copies could be distributed over the country in this way. Prior to this, two trucks brought the balloons with the propaganda material to a favourable location, which had been chosen after consultation with a meteorologist. If the wind blew in the direction of Belgium or France, the magazine Le Courrier de l'Air was tied to the balloon. If it blew in the direction of Germany, propaganda sheets for the enemy troops were attached.

The content of the newspaper essentially covered four main topics. The first one commented on current events before they were forgotten. Secondly, it dealt with issues relating to Germany, the enemy of the war, such as criticism from German newspapers. Thirdly, bizarre and comical stories about the Germans were disseminated, in particular describing their weaknesses and allegedly immoral actions. German institutions and war regulations were also the subject of mockery. Finally, there were editorials on current issues, taken from important newspapers or from the editorial staff itself. All articles were first prepared in English and then translated into French.

The newspaper Le Courrier de l'Air, like other British propaganda material, is considered a very successful measure to strengthen the morale of the population in the occupied territories or to attack that of German soldiers. German newspapers, especially during the last two months of the war, constantly reported on the "poisoned arrows from the air", as the propaganda sheets were called. On November 2, 1918, an excerpt from a letter in the "Kölner Amtsblatt" was published in all London newspapers. In it a high German official complained about the enemy propaganda: "What caused the greatest damage was the paperwork of our enemies, who flooded us daily with several hundred thousand leaflets, exceptionally well presented and edited." During the last months of the war, the German side attempted to prevent the newspaper from spreading through rigorous punitive measures. For example, possession of the newspaper or the distribution of news from it was punishable by a fine of 10,000 marks in addition to a year's imprisonment.

The last official edition of the newspaper appeared on November 7, 1918 and bore the number 78.

A complete set of all editions (No. 1 - No. 78) can be seen today in the British Museum in London.

== Sources ==
- https://www.psywar.org/content/courrier Edward Heron-Allenby: A report on the WWI leaflet-newspaper Le Courrier de l'Air
- https://www.psywarrior.com/WWIAllies.html Herbert A. Friedman: ALLIED PSYOP OF WWI
