= Gustavo Franco =

Brazilian economist (born 1956)

President of the Central Bank
- In office 20 August 1997 – 4 March 1999
- President: Fernando Henrique Cardoso
- Preceded by: Gustavo Loyola
- Succeeded by: Arminio Fraga
- In office 31 December 1994 – 11 January 1995
- President: Itamar Franco; Fernando Henrique Cardoso
- Preceded by: Pedro Malan
- Succeeded by: Pérsio Arida

Personal details
- Born: 10 May 1956 (age 70) Rio de Janeiro, Brazil
- Party: NOVO (2017–present)
- Other political affiliations: PSDB (1989–2017)
- Education: Pontifical Catholic University of Rio de Janeiro (BEc, MEc); Harvard University (PhD)
- Occupation: Economist, professor, consultant

Gustavo Henrique de Barroso Franco (born April 10, 1956, in Rio de Janeiro) is a Brazilian economist. A former Governor of the Brazilian Central Bank, he is best known for being one of the "fathers" of the Real Plan, the 1994 monetary reform that ended hyperinflation in Brazil. He teaches economics at the Catholic University in Rio de Janeiro since 1986. He is also a businessman, consultant and has served on many boards. He founded Rio Bravo Investimentos where he works as Senior Advisor. He has written several books, academic papers and contributes regularly to newspapers and magazines.

== Early life and studies ==
Franco was born in Rio de Janeiro on April 10, 1956. His mother Maria Isabel Barbosa de Barroso Franco, was from Teófilo Otoni, state of Minas Gerais, and his father, Guilherme Arinos Lima Verde de Barroso Franco, was born in Itacoatiara, at the backlands of the state of Amazonas. Guilherme Arinos made a career at Banco do Brasil and during the war started a lifelong friendship and association to President Getúlio Vargas. Arinos was a member of the first board of directors of the Brazilian National Development Bank, BNDES, and later, at the private sector, was a high ranked executive of Volkswagen do Brasil and one of the founders of Banco Garantia.

Gustavo Franco attended Colégio São Vicente de Paulo in Rio de Janeiro and Colégio Notre Dame de Sion in 1960/1974. He obtained a bachelor's (1975–1979) and master's (1983) degree in economics at the Pontifícia Universidade Católica do Rio de Janeiro (PUC-Rio), where he developed interests in economic history and macroeconomics. At PUC-Rio he had his first job as teaching assistant working with Edmar Bacha, then preparing a macroeconomic textbook, self-defined as of a neo-structuralist approach, and later to become very popular in Brazil, with several editions

Winston Fritsch was his advisor in his M. A. thesis on the topic of financial euphoria and crash in the early years of the Brazilian Republic (1889-1890) and the attempts at monetary reform in connection either adhering to the gold standard or, alternatively to experience with fiat currency models, as proposed by Ruy Barbosa. His M. A. thesis was approved cum landae in 1982 and in 1983 won the prestigious "Prêmio BNDES de Economia" for the M. A. thesis in Brazil. This work was published as a book titled Monetary reform and instability during the republican transition ("Reforma monetária e instabilidade durante a transição republicana"") and became a reference to the period it covers.

In sequence, Franco was accepted in Ph.D programs in the universities of Chicago, Yale and Harvard, for which he headed. There he chose as fields of specialization, international economics under Jeffrey Sachs and economic history under Barry Eichengreen. He had brief fellowships at the CFIA (Center for International Affairs), CES (Centre for European Studies) and National Bureau of Economic Research (NBER).

Sachs and Eichengreen were his supervisors, and along with MIT professor Lance Taylor, formed his thesis committee. Franco earned his Ph.D Degree at Harvard in 1986, with a dissertation titled Aspects of the Economics of Hyperinflations: Theoretical Issues and Historical Studies of Four European Hyperinflations of the 1920s. His original thesis had four theoretical chapters on topics as the adoption of indexation in contracts, inflation (stabilization) as public good problem, plagued by free rider issues, the inflation tax as motivation to the process and the dynamics of dollarization, distributive tensions and external balance. The applied chapters were case studies for Germany, Austria, Hungary, and Poland, also including some common themes like the relation between external imbalances, dollarization and fiscal reforms in the context of specific stabilization experiences.

This work was nominated to the David Wells Prize in Harvard and was awarded a national prize ("Prêmio Haralambos Simionides") in 1987, for the best Ph.D. thesis or book in economics, given by the National Association of Graduate Studies in Economics (ANPEC, Associação Nacional de Centros de Pós Graduação em Economia).

== Teaching and research ==
Returning to Brazil in 1986, as a faculty member at the Economics Department at PUC-Rio, Franco worked as teacher, researcher and consultant from 1986 to 1993 when he was called to work with Fernando Henrique Cardoso, the newly nominated Finance Minister then starting his tenure.

He had an intense academic activity during these years; his research interests had three key themes: (i) on high inflation and on the basis of topics and issues raised in his doctoral dissertation; (ii) on Brazil's economic history, mostly in connection with macroeconomic and monetary issues; and (iii) on trade policies, multinational enterprises and economic development, in collaboration with Winston Fritsch.

=== Hyperinflation ===
Two papers out of specific chapters of his doctoral dissertation were published in peer reviewed journals and had some relevant repercussion on his later work of fighting hyperinflation in Brazil:

"Fiscal Reforms and Stabilization: four hyperinflation cases examined" was published in The Economic Journal (vol. 100, no. 399, March 1990) disputed Thomas Sargent's popular explanation to the sudden end of hyperinflation as result of a wide-ranging fiscal "regime change". The role of dollarization and of currency reforms were wrongly downplayed by Sargent, as argued by Franco.

"The Rentenmark Miracle" published by Rivista di Storia Economica (Second Series, Volume 4, 1987), then republished in Barry Eichengreen (ed.) Monetary Regime Transformations London, Edward Elgar Publishing Ltd, 1991, was an account of the unique experience in Germany of Wertbestandiges Notgeld - that is, emergency monies of private issuance and with "stable value" as they had indexation clauses -, and the way this led to the rentenmark experience. As argued by Franco the rentenmark was a crucial step in the German stabilization, and not a "cosmetic measure", as put by Thomas Sargent. In fact, the rentenmark model was very relevant for the design of the Brazilian 1994 monetary reform, known as "Real Plan", in which a similar quasi-currency, under the name o URV (acronym for Unidade Real de Valor) played a vital role for the ending of Brazilian hyperinflation.

Much later, in 1995, Thomas Sargent wrote an article on the Brazilian URV, evoking the German experience with the rentenmark and arguing, as per the mathematician David Hilbert, that one could not solve the hyperinflation problem by "changing the name of the independent variable". The URV, argued Sargent, would have been "a sideshow that hasn't touched the fundamental causes of inflation", and again Franco took issue with that, writing in 2017, but this time on the back of the successful adoption of the URV mechanism. According to Franco: "Understandably", Brazilians "did not take these observations seriously" as "the country was enchanted by the URV mechanism in view of practical problems it solved elegantly, efficiently and voluntarily, so that they received with blunt indifference a thesis from an outside observer claiming that the mechanism had no utility".

=== Economic history ===
In sequence to the work on monetary reforms in the early years of the Republic, Franco published several pieces on the Brazilian monetary experience in the years prior to the Great Depression. All this work is in Portuguese except "Aspects of the Brazilian Experience with the Gold Standard", in Pablo Matín Aceña and Jaime Reis (orgs.) Monetary standards in the periphery: paper, silver and gold, 1854-1933 (London, Macmillan Press. 2000). Later, his research on the early years of the Republic would communicate well with his work of Machado de Assis newspapers articles as per his selection of chronicles under the title "O olhar obliquo do acionista" ( "Shareholders oblique look", as literal translation).

=== Foreign trade and multinational companies ===
Franco worked in collaboration with Winston Fritsch in a series of projects supported by the OECD Development Center. One publication was Foreign direct investment and industrial restructuring: issues and trends (Development Centre Studies, OECD Development Centre, OECD, Paris, 1991), another was "Efficient Industrialization in a Technologically Dependent Economy: The Current Brazilian Debate" in Competition and Economic Development Committee of Competition Law and Policy, OECD, 1991.

In sequence, Franco and Fritsch worked in two projects directed by Gerry Helleiner for WIDER (World Institute for Development Economics Research) of the United Nations University during 1990 and 1991. The first was on the influence of trade orientation on development models and was published as "Foreign Direct investment and patterns of trade and industrialization in developing countries: notes with reference to the Brazilian experience" in G. K. Helleiner (org.) Trade Policy, Industrialization and Development: a reconsideration. (Oxford, Clarendon Press for UNU-Wider, 1992 ISBN 0-19-828359-8). The second, on the same issues but focused on trade and industrial policies was published as "Import repression, productivity slowdown, and manufactured export dynamism: Brazil,1975-1990" in Gerry Helleiner (org.) Trade policy and industrialization in turbulent times (London: Routledge for UNU-Wider, 1993, ISBN 0-415-10711-3).

Franco and Fritsch also worked in projects for UNCTAD and ECLA, and published in the academic circuit on these same issues. Franco would return to these themes only after 1995 when, as deputy governor of the Central Bank responsible for international affairs organized a Census on foreign direct investment into Brazil that has been conducted and published each five years since 1995.

== Public service ==
Between 1993 and 1999, Franco was active in public service. He started in May 1993 as Deputy Secretary of Economic Policy at the Finance Ministry up to October 1993 when he moved to the Central Bank of Brazil in the position of Deputy Governor responsible for International Affairs, position he occupied until 1997, and only interrupted by a brief tenure as governor of the Central Bank of Brazil between December 1994 and January 1995. On August 20, 1997 he was confirmed governor of the Central Bank of Brazil, until leaving on January 9, 1999, and briefly returning in March 1999 to transfer his functions to his successor Arminio Fraga.

=== Economic Policy Secretary ===
Franco served as Deputy Economic Policy Secretary at the Finance Ministry from May to October 1993 by invitation from the newly appointed Minister, Fernando Henrique Cardoso, the fourth Finance Minister of president Itamar Franco, who had become president in December 1992 after the resignation of Fernando Collor de Mello. The other economists in the group were Winston Fristch, as Secretary of Economic Policy and Edmar Bacha as special adviser. In his memoir, Cardoso recollects that “with a small team facing a gigantic challenge, as a Brancaleone's Army, ... we started to work, under a very discouraging political atmosphere”. This team faced a paradoxical pressure: not to repeat economic shocks and to produce some solution to inflation, then approaching 30% per month. The team's first major announcement was described by Franco, as a “non-package” or rather “an ambitious collection of medium term fundamentalists agendas”, curiously named as PAI (acronym for Plano de Ação Imediata, Plan of Immediate Action), released on June 13, 1993. In sharp contrast with previous stabilization attempts, this document seemed to point that the Real Plan would start by the end offering “some sort of strategic planning of actions in issues associated with the so-called fiscal and monetary fundamentals to stabilization”.

=== Deputy Governor for International Affairs at the Central Bank ===
Franco was appointed Deputy Governor for International Affairs at the Central Bank on September 8, 1993, when Pedro Malan was appointed Governor. Simultaneously, Pérsio Arida was designated president of BNDES, and André Lara Rezende replaced Malan was chief negotiator of then pending Brazilian external debt. With this enlarged composition, the economic team around minister Cardoso started preparations towards the Real Plan.

In parallel, Franco had executive responsibilities in International Affairs at the Central Bank related to operational aspects of external debt restructuring under the Brady Plan, then at decisive moments, the administrative structures in charge of exchange controls, bound to be transformed by an ambitious deregulation process, the FOREX trading desk and international reserves management.

==== External debt, Brady Plan and new bond issues ====
At the moment Franco and Malan started working together at the Central Bank, the debt negotiation process was around the precise form of exchange of Brazilian currency denominated deposits owned by creditors (under the MYDFAs, Multi Year Deposit Facility Agreement) for newly issued bonds according to the Brady plan's menu. In the final sequence of this process, Franco was in charge of the composition of the collateral guaranties for the new bonds under the Brady scheme. These guaranties would take the form of US Treasury Zero Coupon bonds with certain features, with a face value of approximately US$18 billion (and market value of US$2,8 billion) to be acquired with funds provided by the IMF under a stand-by agreement.

However, IMF representatives did not feel comfortable with the drafts of the Real Plan shown during the negotiations of the stand-by agreement and refused to go on with the loan, forcing the Brazilian authorities to develop some alternative strategy to acquire the US Treasury bonds in the secondary market using Brazil's international reserves. The deal was described in detail in Guilherme Fiuza's book in the chapter titled Sorry, Mr. Fagenbaum.

Right next to completing Brazil's Brady Plan version, simultaneously with the Real Plan, Franco dealt with Paris Club debt and the Dart family, who did not wish to adhere to the Brady exchange. With these issues sorted out the challenge for the Republic was to return to international markets with new bonds and proceed with the building of a yield curve. The new program coordinated and executed by Franco comprised 16 new issues in 10 different currencies, between 1995 and 1998, totaling US$8,2 billion, including the issuance of the so called "BR-27" (the first 30-year bond voluntarily issued in decades, falling due in 2027) in exchange for cash and for Brady bonds, thus recovering the previously offered collateral in US Treasury bonds.

==== Forex deregulation and phasing out exchange controls ====
Exchange controls deregulation was one of the greatest challenges of the International Affairs section of the Brazilian Central Bank, a modernization imperative and an essential condition for the prevalence of supply and demand as determinants of the exchange rate.

The architecture of liberalization was based on the creation of new and segregated market for US Dollars in which rates were determined by supply and demand in parallel to the official market and to compete upfront with the “black market”. Initially fed only by Dollars sold by tourists, the scope of transactions was gradually extended, while, liberalization in the official market, along with a better balance of payments stance, resulted in gradually eliminating the spread between official and free markets.

From 1988 to 2006, when all legal markets were unified, deregulation consisted in expanding the nature of transactions that could take place in the free market, including gold related arbitrages, and remittances from non-resident local currency accounts, though always preserving full identification of players.

After 1995, under Franco's direction, the Central Bank introduced several new rules for leads and lags in foreign trade, portfolio investment and turned “registry” of foreign capital inflows into a statistical event, and no longer dependent on authorization. Interestingly, however, one key innovation introduced along with liberalization of outflows was the selective restriction applied on certain types of inflows, mostly of a short-term nature. Capital surges had been producing restrictive measures in many countries, most visibly (for Brazilians) Chile, where restrictions took the form of a “quarantine”, or a minimum stay for foreign capital. In Brazil, instead, restrictions were implemented mostly as a tax of foreign exchange inflows, and without any “quarantine”. The formula was used many times over in later moments of foreign exchange abundance in order to reduce appreciation and/or extend maturities of foreign liabilities.

== Plano Real ==
The Real Plan had as central element a monetary reform effected through three successive measures: the first and more important introduced on February 28, 1994, created the URV (Unidade Real de Valor) mechanism, that is, a "money of account" to be freely used in contracts and obligations in order to realign relative prices and coordinate price fixing around the exchange rate. It was also established that at some point in the near future, the URV would become the national legal tender to replace then circulating cruzeiros reais. Just like the German rentenmark, and reflected also previous models of monetary reform conceived by André Lara Rezende and Persio Arida. At this moment, the new national currency, the URV would have its denomination conveniently changed to real. The second, launched at July 1, 1994, complemented the reform, demonetizing cruzeiros reais and actually issuing the real. Also, this second instrument introduced some very important institutional changes in monetary governance, with a major reform in the National Monetary Council, and monetary policy. The third, closing the cycle of monetary reform, was a detailed statute for indexation practices that was implemented exactly one year after the real was first issued.

The URV existed as legal tender, though only as unit of account, during four months: its initial quote with respect to cruzeiro real was CR$647,50, more or less equivalent to one Dollar, as it was its final quote as CR$2.750,00, on July 1, 1994, when the cruzeiro real was demonetized and the URV was turned into the national currency and renamed as real. In consequence of this unusual parity it was not possible to stamp old cruzeiros reais notes, so that one entirely new family of notes was issued at once, a remarkably difficult logistics effort

At the day of the first issues of the new currency, in an unprecedented move, the Central Bank abstained from intervening in the foreign exchange market and let the new currency float. In consequence, the exchange rate between the URV (now the real) and the Dollar, fell below R$1,00 (i. e. it appreciated) with a great positive impact on expectations and marking the successful conclusion of the stabilization process first phase.

The combination of tight monetary policy with floating exchange rates, later under a "target zone regime", or "exchange rate bands", resulted immensely successful to eliminate hyperinflation, but remained one of the more controversial aspects of the Brazilian stabilization experience, and one generally addressed to Franco.

The results of the Real Plan on inflation, as measured by national cost of living index, IPCA - published by the National Statistics Bureau - IBGE, were as follows:inflation was running at 43,1% monthly (on average for he first semester of 1994), or 7.260% annually, up to July 1994, the first month of existence of the new currency. In July alone prices rose 6,8%, but the accumulated inflation for the next twelve months was only 33,0%. From this level onward, inflation goes on declining slowly: measured by IPCA, inflation fell below 20%, on a 12 months accumulated basis, only in April 1996, 22nd month after the introduction of the new currency; below 10% only in December, 30th month of the real. Within the calendar year of 1997, the rate of inflation was 5,2%, and in 1998 inflation was finally reduced to 1,6%, the lowest rate on record since the creation of the Brazilian Central Bank in 1964.

=== Institutional aspects and "fundamentals" ===
Before the Real Plan, five stabilization attempts failed between 1986 and 1991 all of which involving price freezes, all but one creating a new currency and one, the so-called Collor Plan in 1990, with an asset freeze much like monetary reforms in Europe following World War II. These failed experiments were called "heterodox shocks" not only because of direct intervention in prices and intrusive currency reforms, but also for their practical disregard of fiscal "fundamentals" and monetary policies. The Real Plan followed a different path opening several reforms agendas attacking fundamental disequilibria at the core of the hyperinflation process.

The first was related to the institutional organization of the monetary system. the National Monetary Council was recaptured and reduced to three members (ministers of Finance and Planning and the Governor of the Central Bank), recomposing the commitment of top level decision making to price stability. Sometime later a Monetary Policy Committee (known as COPOM - acronym of Comitê de Política Monetária) was created securing Central Bank's independence in fixing the interest rate.

Next, federal banks, and especially Banco do Brasil, had to recognize previous losses, be recapitalized, abide by "Basle Rules" and cease to have unrestricted accommodation at the Central Bank. Provincial banks entered a severe adjustment program through which several liquidations and privatizations reduced their size to almost negligible. Some private banks in trouble entered a program through which the Central Bank financed liquidations, resolutions and changes in control of banking activities. It was a heavy agenda with the banking system, public and private, to reorder the monetary system and its governance.

There were numerous fiscal adjustment initiatives, starting with several rounds of debt refinancing with adjustment programs with the states during 1993–1998. The Federal Government gave accommodation to states in exchange for orthodox fiscal programs and several limitations as to their fiscal policies. These programs templates provided a framework to a new Public Finances Law, proposed in 1999, creating benchmarks and limitations for indebtedness and wages expenses, later approved under the designation "Fiscal Responsibility Law", held to be a major progress in securing fiscal balance in the public sector in Brazil .

Another important initiative was the 1993 Constitutional Amendment known as Social Emergency Fund (Fundo Social de Emergência, approved during the constitutional revision in March, 1993) which removed most of earmarking in the budget, and allowing the National Treasury to regain control of budgeted expenses. Even so, primary fiscal results were weak during the first few years after 1994. Due to the advancement of reforms, these weak fiscal numbers did not become an issue until the Asian crisis in 1997 and especially in 1998 with the Russian crisis, when Brazil entered an agreement with the IMF and started a decade long period of primary surpluses at the level of 3% of GDP.

Franco left the Central Bank after the IMF Agreement and after the reelection of Fernando Henrique Cardoso for a second term in 1998. Franco received late in 1998 Euromoney's prize “Central Banker of the year, 1998”.

Shortly after, Brazil moved into what was known as the "tripod" policy: floating exchange rates, primary fiscal surplus and inflation targets. Brazil was ready, at this point, to switch from the exchange rate "anchor" into the inflation targets regime. Franco's account of controversies around the use of the exchange rate in the stabilization effort and of the dialogue between short term policies and long term reform goals was laid out in several of his writings, some in English.

== Rio Bravo Investimentos ==
After a sabbatical year back at the Catholic University as full-time professor, Franco founded an investment company named Rio Bravo Investimentos, based in São Paulo, to manage mutual funds, structured products, and private equity, in association with Swiss Re. In August 2001 Rio Bravo acquired a broker dealer called Mercurio DTVM and started to manage REITs (Real Estate Investment Trusts) and also with the public distribution of securities. Rio Bravo developed investment banking activities from 2003, when it acquired the local operation of Dresdner Kleinworth Benson, until 2007 when these activities were transferred to Lehman Brothers.

Rio Bravo was active in private equity first through Rio Bravo Nordeste I FMIEE (focused on SMEs in the Northeast region), later, in 2007, with Rio Bravo Nordeste II, the largest regional private equity fund in the country. In February 2006 Rio Bravo acquired MVP Mercatto Venture Partners Ltda., renamed as Rio Bravo Venture Partners Ltda., a venture capital management company based in Rio de Janeiro. Later, in October 2010, Rio Bravo raised its first private equity fund dedicated to investments in renewable energy.

In 2005 a Rio Bravo started Rio Bravo Project Finance Ltd to advise clients in infrastructure projects and also Rio Bravo Fundamental, a value driven listed equity mutual fund.

In May 2008 Rio Bravo spun off its real estate based securitization business into a new company called RB Capital, with no shareholding from Rio Bravo partners. In 2016 RB Capital had its control bought by Orix Group from Japan. In August 2016, Rio Bravo's control was acquired by Fosun International, one of the largest private groups in China.

Franco has been a member of several boards. He is now active as board member of Banco Daycoval, Seguradora Pottencial and as Chairman of Instituto Millenium, a Brazilian think tank.

== Bibliography ==
- A Moeda e a Lei: Uma História Monetária Brasileira, 1933-2013 (2017)
- Antologia da Maldade (with Fabio Giambiagi) (2014)
- As Leis Secretas da Economia: Revisitando Roberto Campos e as Leis do Kafka (2012)
- Cartas a um Jovem Economista: Conselhos para seus Planos Econômicos (2010)
- Shakespeare e a Economia (2009)
- O Olhar Oblíquo do Acionista: A Economia em Machado de Assis (org.) (2007)
- A Economia em Pessoa: Verbetes Contemporâneos (org.) (2006)
- Crônicas da Convergência: Ensaios sobre Temas já não tão Polêmicos (2006)
- O Papel e a Baixa do Câmbio: Um Discurso Histórico de Rui Barbosa (org.) (2005)
- O Desafio Brasileiro: Ensaios sobre Desenvolvimento, Globalização e Moeda (1999)
- O Plano Real e outros Ensaios (1995)
- Foreign Direct Investment in Brazil: Its Impact on Industrial Restructuring (1991)
- A Década Republicana: o Brasil e a Economia Internacional - 1888/1900 (1991)
- Aspects of the Economics of Hyperinflations: Theoretical Issues and Historical Studies of Four European Hyperinflations of the 1920s (1986)
- Reforma Monetária e Instabilidade Durante a Transição Republicana (1983)

Government offices
| Preceded by Pedro Malan | President of the Central Bank of Brazil; 1994–1995; 1997–1999 | Succeeded by Pérsio Arida |
| Preceded by Gustavo Loyola | President of the Central Bank of Brazil; 1994–1995; 1997–1999 | Succeeded by Arminio Fraga |
