= Pedro Malan =

Brazilian economist and politician

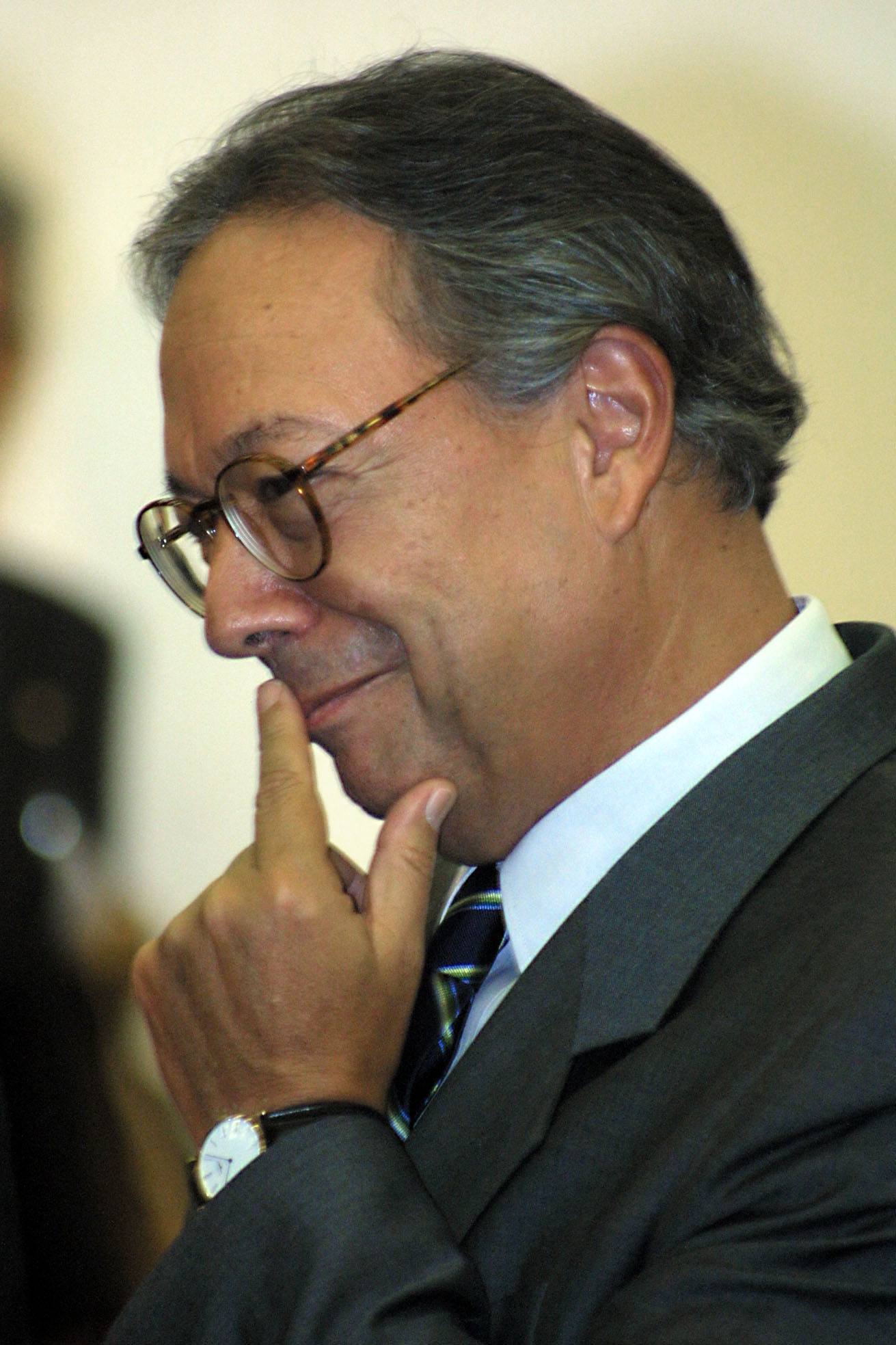

Minister of Finance
- In office 1 January 1995 – 1 January 2003
- President: Fernando Henrique Cardoso
- Preceded by: Ciro Gomes
- Succeeded by: Antonio Palocci

Chair of the Central Bank
- In office 9 September 1993 – 31 December 1994
- President: Itamar Franco
- Preceded by: Paulo César Ximenes
- Succeeded by: Pérsio Arida

Personal details
- Born: 19 February 1943 (age 83) Petropolis, Rio de Janeiro, Brazil
- Education: Pontifical Catholic University of Rio de Janeiro; University of California, Berkeley
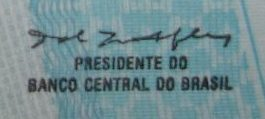
- Signature

Pedro Sampaio Malan (born 1943 in Rio de Janeiro) is a Brazilian economist and former Minister of Finance of Brazil. He is the father of journalist and correspondent Cecília Malan.

== Early life ==
Pedro Sampaio Malan was born in 1943 in Petropolis, a town named in honor of Dom Pedro II to the north of Rio de Janeiro. Malan was educated in a Jesuit school before studying electrical engineering at the Pontifícia Universidade Católica do Rio de Janeiro.

While working as a research associate at Rio's Institute of Applied Economic Research he first met the U.S. economics teacher Albert Fishlow, who would in 1973 be his adviser for his doctorate in economics from the University of California, Berkeley. His thesis was Brazil's Place in the International Economy.

Malan continued to live in the USA working for various multilateral agencies until 1993.

== Brazilian Central Bank ==
Malan returned to Brazil in 1993 at the request of the then finance minister Fernando Henrique Cardoso, who asked him to head the Central Bank. Malan was President of the Brazilian Central Bank, from September 9, 1993, to December 31, 1994.

== Minister of Finance ==
Malan was the Minister of Finance for Brazil, from January 1, 1995, to December 31, 2002, during the presidency of Fernando Henrique Cardoso. Along with Marcílio Marques Moreira, Malan worked for the Fernando Collor de Mello administration as an official negotiator of the foreign debt of Brazil with the International Monetary Fund. He is credited with successfully reforming the nation's banking system, saving Brazil from the negative effects of 1997's Asian market crisis.

He was also one of the architects of the Plano Real.

== Member of Boards ==
Pedro Malan is a former chairman of the Board of the Unibanco bank (2004 – 2008) and continues to sit as Chairman of the International Advisory Board of Itaú Unibanco.

Pedro is currently a member of the Boards of utility company EDP - Energias do Brasil (since 2006) and construction and industrial maintenance company Mills Estruturas e Serviços de Engenharia S/A (since 2010). He is a Trustee of the Thomson Reuters Trust Principles and a member of the Temasek International Panel.

Pedro also served on the Board of Souza Cruz S.A, a subsidiary company of British American Tobacco, until his appointment to the Board of British American Tobacco p.l.c.

Dr. Pedro Malan was appointed to the Board of British American Tobacco p.l.c. as a Non-Executive Director in February 2015. He is a member of the Corporate Social Responsibility and Nominations Committees.

Government offices
| Preceded by Paulo César Ximenes | President of the Central Bank; 1993–1994 | Succeeded by Gustavo Franco |
Political offices
| Preceded by Ciro Gomes | Minister of Finance; 1995–2003 | Succeeded by Antonio Palocci |
