= Brazilian cruzeiro real =

Brazilian currency from 1993 to 1994

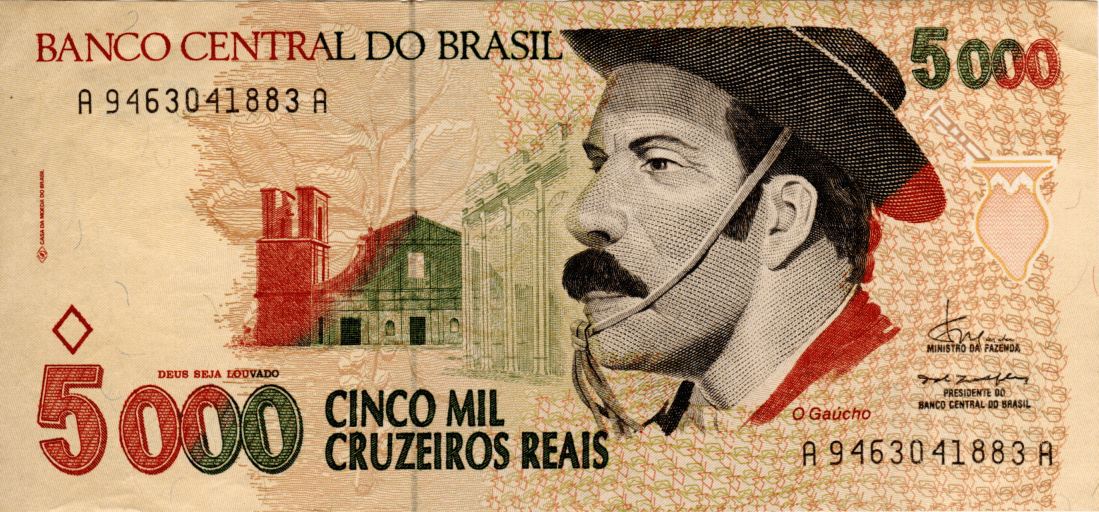
- A 5,000 cruzeiros reais banknote from 1993, featuring a gaúcho on the obverse

ISO 4217
- Code: BRR

Units of account
- Base unit: cruzeiro real
- Plural: cruzeiros reais
- Symbol: CR$
- Subunit
- 1/100: centavo (only used for accounting purposes)
- Plural
- centavo: centavos

Denominations
- Banknotes: CR$50, CR$100, CR$500, CR$1000, CR$5000, CR$50 000
- Coins: CR$5, CR$10, CR$50, CR$100

Demographics
- Date of introduction: 1 August 1993
- Replaced: Cruzeiro (BRE)
- Date of withdrawal: 1 July 1994
- Replaced by: Real (BRL)
- User(s): Brazil

Issuance
- Central bank: Central Bank of Brazil
- Website: www.bc.gov.br
- Printer: Casa da Moeda do Brasil
- Website: www.casadamoeda.com.br
- Mint: Casa da Moeda do Brasil
- Website: www.casadamoeda.com.br
- This infobox shows the latest status before this currency was rendered obsolete.

The cruzeiro real ($\mathrm{CRS}\!\!\!\Vert$, plural: cruzeiros reais) was the short-lived currency of Brazil between 1 August 1993 and 1 July 1994. It was subdivided in 100 centavos; however, this subunit was used only for accounting purposes, and coins and banknotes worth 10 to 500 of the preceding cruzeiro remained valid and were used for the purpose of corresponding to centavos of the cruzeiro real, especially when the redenomination was carried out. The currency had the ISO 4217 code BRR.

This redenomination, at the beginning of the second half of 1993, was made with the objective of facilitating the accounting of day-to-day activities, which in the previous unit implied the placement of several zeros that made it difficult to record values in calculators and machines.

The cruzeiro real was replaced with the current Brazilian real as part of the Plano Real.

== History ==
The cruzeiro real replaced the third cruzeiro, with 1,000 cruzeiros = 1 cruzeiro real. The cruzeiro real was replaced in circulation by the real at a rate of 1 real for 2,750 cruzeiros reais. Before this occurred, the unidade real de valor (pegged to the U.S. dollar at parity) was used in pricing, to allow the population to become accustomed to a stable currency (after many years of high inflation) before the real was introduced.

== Coins ==
Standard circulation stainless-steel coins were issued in 1993 and 1994 in denominations of 5, 10, 50 and 100 cruzeiros reais. The reverse of the coins portrayed iconic animals of the Brazilian fauna. Coins worth 10 or more of the previous cruzeiro were retained to correspond to smaller denominations, such as the 1,000-cruzeiro coin for a single cruzeiro real, but became scarce by the end of 1993.

No commemorative coins were issued for the Cruzeiro Real.

Coins of the Cruzeiro Real
| Reverse | Obverse | Value | Details |
|---|---|---|---|
| | | CR$5 | Portrays macaws |
| | | CR$10 | Portrays a giant anteater |
| | | CR$50 | Portrays jaguars |
| | | CR$100 | Portrays a maned wolf |

The macaw and jaguar were represented again in the Real's R$10 and R$50 bills, respectively, after their introduction in 1994, and the maned wolf was later portrayed in the R$200 bill since its introduction in late 2020.

== Banknotes ==
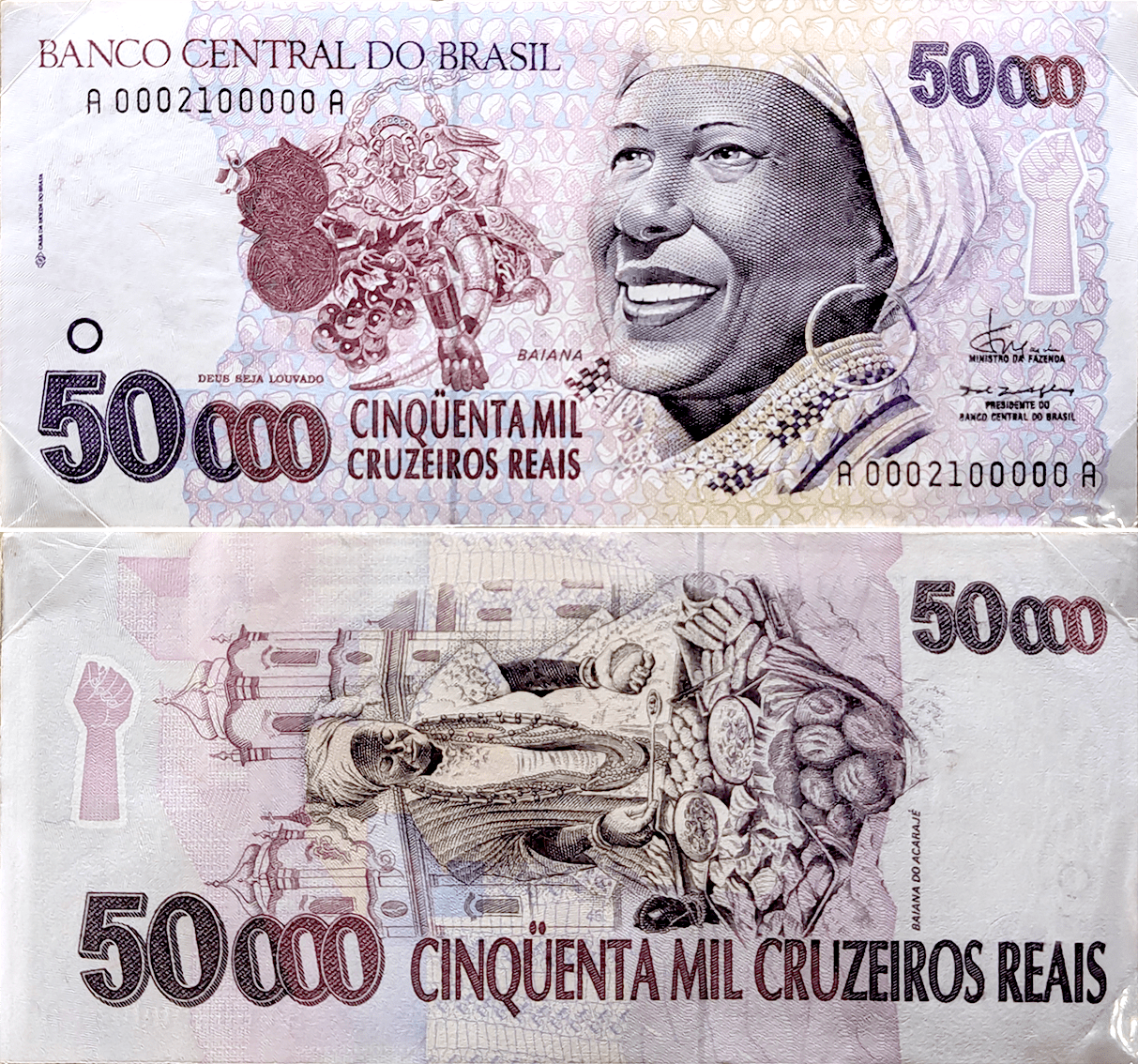
The 50,000 cruzeiro real banknote had the shortest time in circulation: it was released on March 30, 1994, Plano Real was introduced on July 1, 1994, and it ceased to be legal tender on September 15 of that year.

In 1993, provisional banknotes were introduced in the form of cruzeiro notes overprinted in the new currency. These were in denominations of 50, 100 and 500 cruzeiros reais. Regular notes followed in denominations of 1,000, 5,000 and 50,000 cruzeiros reais. The 10,000 cruzeiros reais banknote was designed and scheduled to be put into circulation in the first months of 1994, but inflation and the impending release of a new economic plan put its release on hold and only the 50,000 Cruzeiro real banknote was released.

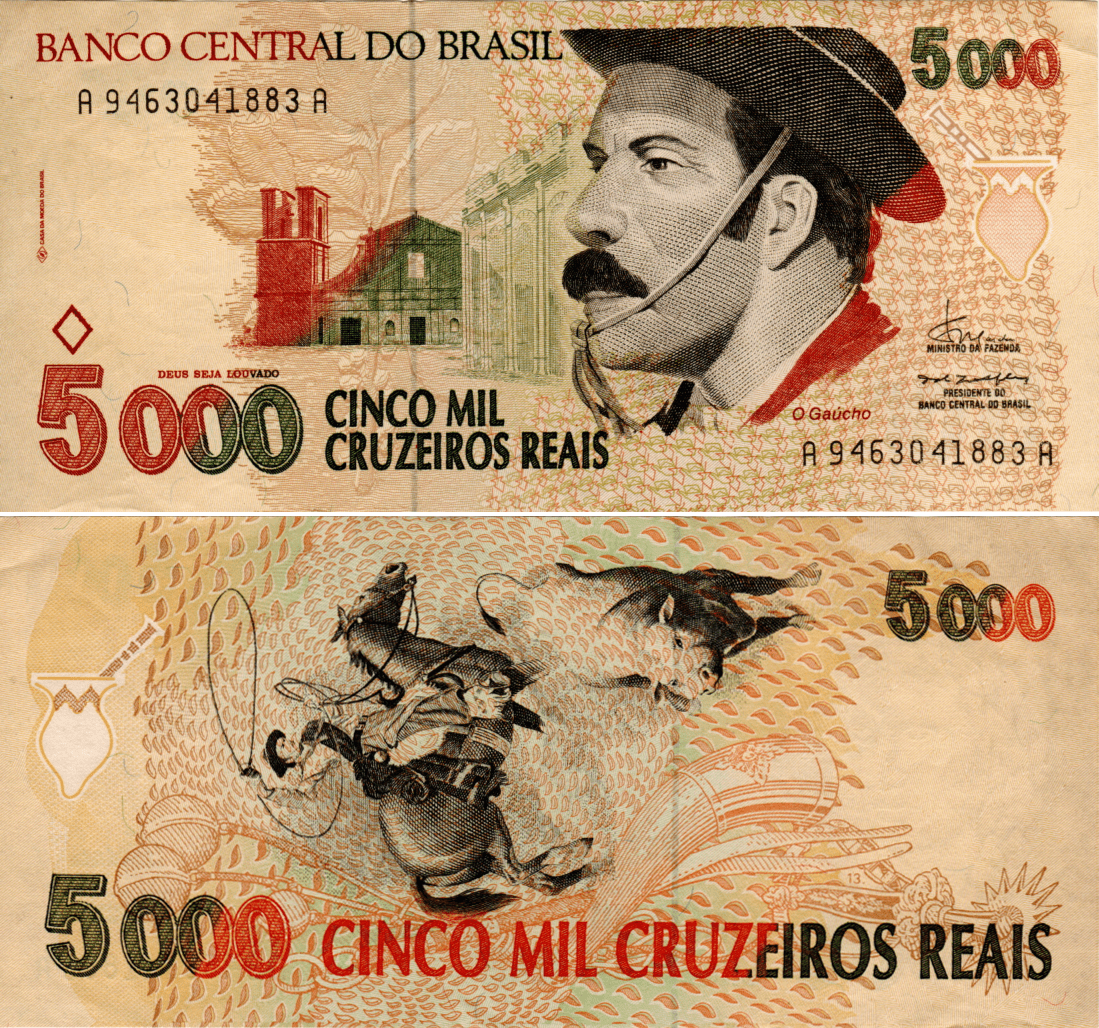
A CR$5,000 banknote portraying a gaúcho and chimarrão-shaped watermarks

Brazilian cruzeiro real (BRR)
| Preceded by: Cruzeiro (BRE); Reason: inflation Ratio: Cr$1,000 = CR$1 | Currency of Brazil; 1 August 1993 – 1 July 1994 | Succeeded by: Real (BRL); Reason: inflation Ratio: CR$2,750 = R$1 |
