= Pérsio Arida =

Brazilian economist

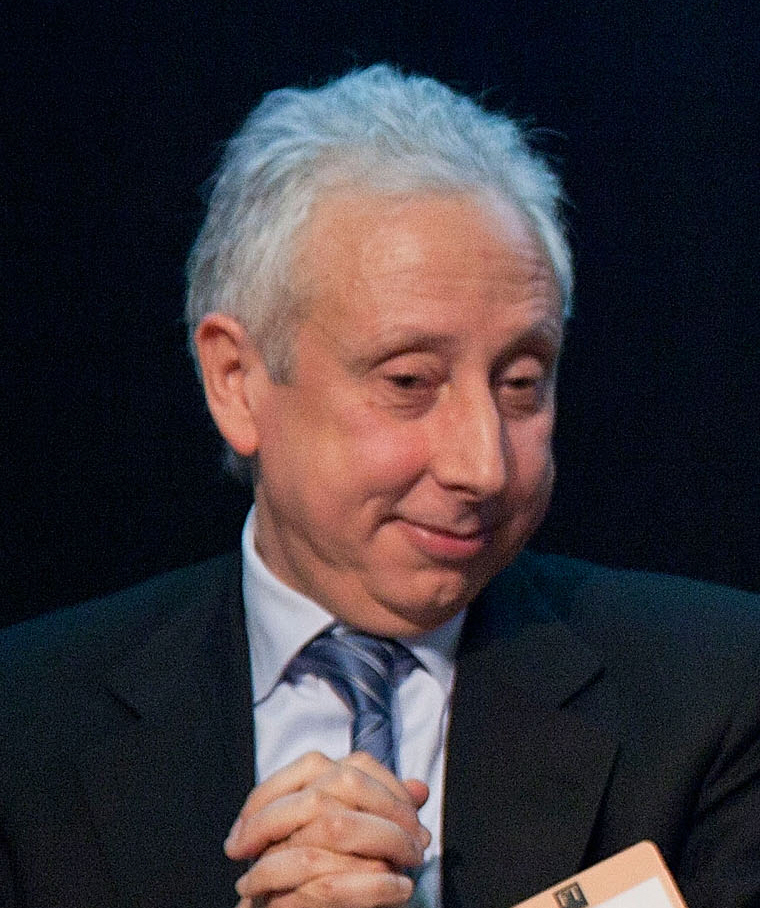
- Arida at the Brazil's China Connection by Financial Times, in New York, October 2011

Chair of the Central Bank
- In office 11 January 1995 – 13 June 1995
- President: Fernando Henrique Cardoso
- Preceded by: Pedro Malan
- Succeeded by: Gustavo Loyola

Chair of the Brazilian Development Bank
- In office 3 September 1993 – 31 December 1994
- President: Itamar Franco
- Preceded by: Luis Carlos Delben Leite
- Succeeded by: Edmar Bacha

Personal details
- Born: 1 March 1952 (age 74) São Paulo, São Paulo, Brazil
- Spouse: Elena Landau
- Children: 2
- Parents: Riad Arida (father); Alice Farah (mother)
- Education: University of São Paulo; Massachusetts Institute of Technology

Pérsio Arida (born 1 March 1952 in São Paulo) is a Brazilian economist and a former president of the Central Bank of Brazil.

He has a bachelor's degree in economics from University of São Paulo and a Ph.D. in economics from Massachusetts Institute of Technology.

He has served the Brazilian government by taking part in the crafting of the Plano Real; more specifically, he was one of the creators of the Unidade Real de Valor, a non-monetary currency and the most sophisticated and theoretical piece of the Plano Real. In 1995, he served as the president of the Central Bank of Brazil and Special Secretary of Social-Economic Coordination, Ministry of Planning. In the private sector, he was a board member of Banco Itaú Holding Financeira S.A. and Banco Itaú S.A., board member of Sul-América S.A, director of Opportunity Asset Management Ltda., board member of Unibanco S.A. and special adviser for the presidency and director of Brasil Warrant Ltd. Since the 1970s, he has also worked as an economic and financial consultant.

As of 2008, he is working as a member of the executive council of the Moreira Salles Institute.

He is also a member of the International Advisory Board at the Blavatnik School of Government (University of Oxford) and a member of the Academic Board of Livres.

Personally, he is also a fan of classical music.

== Selected publications ==
- Arida, Pérsio (1983), Social differentiation and economic theory, Texto para discussão (Pontifícia Universidade Católica do Rio de Janeiro. Departamento de Economia), no. 58., Pontifícia Universidade Católica do Rio de Janeiro, Departamento de Economia, OCLC 13360329
- Arida, Pérsio (1984), Economic stabilization in Brazil, Working papers (Woodrow Wilson International Center for Scholars., no. 149., Latin American Program, the Wilson Center, OCLC 13144128
- Arida, Pérsio (2005) [1992], Essays of Brazilian stabilization programs, Massachusetts Institute of Technology, hdl:1721.1/13161, OCLC 283913814
- Gala, Paulo; Rego, José Márcio; Arida, Pérsio (2003), A história do pensamento econômico como teoria e retórica : ensaios sobre metodologia em economia, Editora 34, ISBN 978-85-7326-267-4

Government offices
Preceded by Luis Carlos Delben Leite	President of the Brazilian Development Bank; 1993–1995	Succeeded by Edmar Bacha
Preceded by Gustavo Franco; Acting	President of the Central Bank of Brazil; 1995	Succeeded by Gustavo Loyola
