= Brazilian Republic (disambiguation) =

Brazilian Republic is a sobriquet for Brazil.

Brazilian Republic may also refer to:

- First Brazilian Republic
- Second Brazilian Republic
- Third Brazilian Republic
- Fourth Brazilian Republic
- Fifth Brazilian Republic
- Sixth Brazilian Republic
