= Ernane Galvêas =

Brazilian economist and politician (1922–2022)

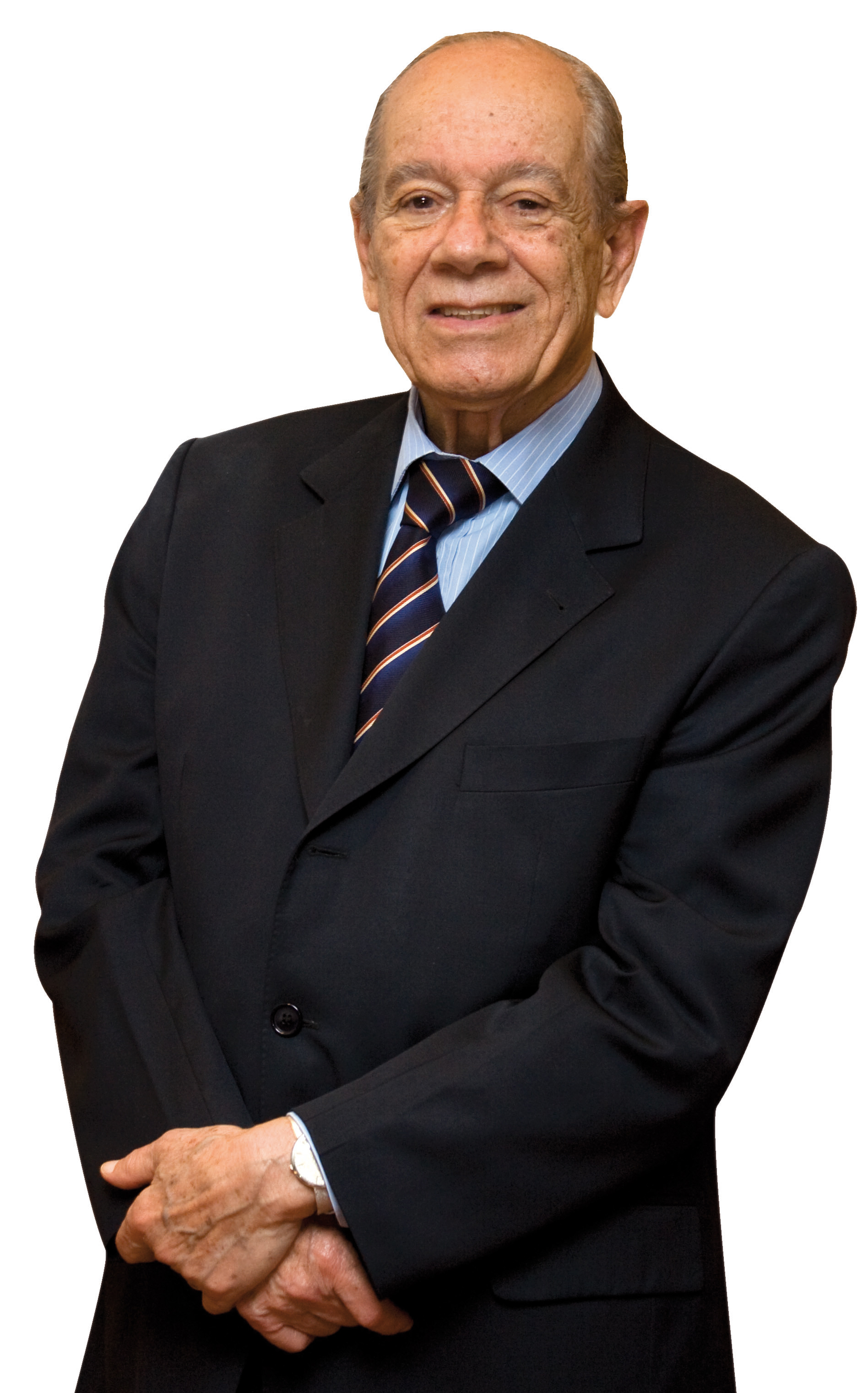
- Galvêas in 2011

President of the Central Bank of Brazil
- In office 21 February 1968 – 15 March 1974
- Preceded by: Ari Burguer
- Succeeded by: Paulo Hortêncio Pereira Lira
- In office 17 August 1979 – 18 January 1980
- Preceded by: Carlos Brandão
- Succeeded by: Carlos Geraldo Langoni

Minister of the Economy
- In office 18 January 1980 – 14 March 1985
- Preceded by: Márcio Fortes
- Succeeded by: Eduardo Pereira de Carvalho

Personal details
- Born: 1 October 1922 Cachoeiro de Itapemirim, Brazil
- Died: 23 June 2022 (aged 99) Rio de Janeiro, Brazil
- Education: Princeton University
- Occupation: Economist

Ernane Galvêas (1 October 1922 – 23 June 2022) was a Brazilian economist and politician. He served as president of the Central Bank of Brazil from 1968 to 1974 and again from 1979 to 1980. He was also Minister of the Economy from 1980 to 1985.

Galvêas died on 23 June 2022 at the age of 99.
