= Affonso Celso Pastore =

Brazilian economist (1938–2024)

Affonso Celso Pastore (19 June 1938 – 21 February 2024) was a Brazilian economist who was the president of the Brazilian Central Bank (1983–1985), having also been Secretary of the São Paulo Treasury Department.

Pastore served as Latin Source's economist in Brazil and was president and founder of A.C. Pastore & Associados, an economic consulting firm based in São Paulo. Pastore served as Brazil advisor for Latin Source, a network of independent advisors.

Pastore was president of the Central Bank of Brazil from 5 September 1983 to 14 March 1985 when the President of Brazil was João Baptista Figueiredo. He had previously served as Secretary of Finance for the State of São Paulo from March 1979 to March 1983 when the governors of São Paulo were Paulo Salim Maluf and José Maria Marin. Earlier still, he was director of research for the Instituto de Pesquisas Econômicas, a foundation associated with the Department of Economics at the University of São Paulo. He also served as director of research at the Fundação Centro de Estudos do Comércio Exterior (FUNCEX).

Pastore received both his bachelor's and his doctorate degrees in economics from the Universidade de São Paulo, where he held the positions of professor and dean of the Department of Economics from 1978 to 1999. He continued teaching graduate courses at the Fundação Getulio Vargas/RJ on "Open Economy Macroeconomics", "Money and Banking" and "Econometrics".

Pastore died in São Paulo on 21 February 2024, at the age of 84.

== Bibliography ==
- Affonso Pastore; Marcelo Gazzano; Maria Pinotti (10 November 2014). Inflação e crises: O papel da moeda. Elsevier Brasil. ISBN 978-85-352-8249-8.
- "Most widely held works by Affonso Celso Pastore". WorldCat.
