= Monetary Policy Committee (Brazil) =

Brazilian financial organization

The Monetary Policy Committee (Portuguese: Comitê de Política Monetária - Copom) is a department established by the Central Bank of Brazil on June 20, 1996, through Circular No. 2698 (revoked as of January 2, 1998 by Circular No. 2780 of November 12, 1997) in order to define monetary policy guidelines and set the basic interest rate. It regulates the liquidity of the economy through monetary policy instruments.

== Definition and history ==
Copom was created on June 20, 1996, to establish monetary policy guidelines and set the economy's basic interest rate. (Note: From July 1, 1996 to March 4, 1999, Copom set the Central Bank Base Rate (Taxa Básica do Banco Central - TBC). From March 5, 1999, with the extinction of the TBC, Copom began to publish the target for the Selic Rate for monetary policy purposes.) The creation of the committee aimed to provide greater transparency and an appropriate protocol for the decision-making process, similar to the Federal Open Market Committee (FOMC) of the Federal Reserve System (The Fed) in the United States, and the Zentralbankrat, the board of the Deutsche Bundesbank, the German central bank. In June 1998, the Bank of England also set up its Monetary Policy Committee (MPC), as has the European Central Bank since the creation of the single currency in January 1999. Currently, several monetary authorities worldwide adopt a similar practice.

Since 1996, Copom's regulations changed regarding the objective, the frequency of meetings, the composition and the duties and powers of its members. These amendments aimed to improve the decision-making process within the committee and to reflect the changes in the monetary regime.

After the introduction of the "inflation targeting" system as a monetary policy guideline by Decree No. 3,088 on June 21, 1999, the Copom's decisions became aimed at fulfilling the inflation targets set by the National Monetary Council (Conselho Monetário Nacional - CMN). According to the decree, if the targets are not achieved, the president of the Central Bank must disclose, in an Open Letter to the Minister of Finance, the reasons for non-compliance, as well as the measures to be adopted and the deadline for returning the inflation rate to the established limits.

Formally, Copom's objectives are to "implement monetary policy, set the Selic rate target and analyze the Inflation Report." The interest rate set at the Copom meeting is the target for the Selic rate (the average interest rate for daily financing backed by sovereign bond and calculated by the Special System for Settlement and Custody - Selic), which is valid for the entire period between ordinary meetings of the committee. Copom can also determine the trend (up or down) of the interest rate. The president of the Central Bank can change the target for the Selic rate by the trend at any time.

== Composition ==
=== Members ===
Copom is composed of the presidents and directors of the Central Bank of Brazil. Other agents from departments directly or indirectly linked to the economy are also part of the committee. The members associated with the Central Bank of Brazil are:

- Chairman;
- Administration Director (Diretor de Administração - Dirad);
- Economic Policy Director (Diretor de Política Econômica - Dipec);
- International Affairs and Corporate Risk Management Director (Diretor de Assuntos Internacionais e de Gestão de Riscos Corporativos - Direx);
- Supervisory Director (Diretor de Fiscalização - Difis);
- Financial System Organization and Resolution Director (Diretor de Organização do Sistema Financeiro e de Resolução - Diorf);
- Monetary Policy Director (Diretor de Política Monetária - Dipom);
- Regulation Director (Diretor de Regulação - Dinor);
- Institutional Relations and Citizenship Department (Diretor de Relacionamento Institucional e Cidadania - Direc).

The heads of the Central Bank's departments also attend the meetings:

- Banking and Payment System Operations Department (Departamento de Operações Bancárias e de Sistema de Pagamentos - Deban);
- Open Market Operations Department (Departamento de Operações do Mercado Aberto - Demab);
- Economic Department (Departamento Econômico - Depec);
- Studies and Research Department (Departamento de Estudos e Pesquisas - Depep);
- International Reserves Department (Departamento das Reservas Internacionais - Depin);
- International Affairs Department (Departamento das Reservas Internacionais - Derin);
- Investor Relations and Special Studies Department (Departamento de Relacionamento com Investidores e Estudos Especiais - Gerin).

Consultants, the executive secretary of the board of directors, the coordinator of the institutional communication group and the press officer of the presidency of the Central Bank also join in the discussions.

==== Current participants ====
Name		Position at the Central Bank	President of the Republic who appointed	Start of term	End of term
1	Roberto Campos Neto	President	Jair Bolsonaro	February 28, 2019	In office
2	Gabriel Muricca Galípolo	Monetary Policy Director	Luiz Inácio Lula da Silva	July 12, 2023	In office
3	Rodrigo Alves Teixeira	Administration Director	Jair Bolsonaro	April 20, 2021	In office
4	Diogo Abry Guillen	Economic Policy Director	Jair Bolsonaro	April 25, 2022	In office
5	Paulo Picchetti	International Affairs and Corporate Risk Management Director	Luiz Inácio Lula da Silva	January 2, 2024	In office
6	Carolina Barros	Relations, Citizenship and Conduct Supervision Director	Luiz Inácio Lula da Silva	January 2, 2024	In office
7	Otávio Ribeiro Damaso	Regulation Director	Jair Bolsonaro	April 20, 2021	In office
8	Ailton de Aquino Santos	Supervisory Director	Luiz Inácio Lula da Silva	July 12, 2023	In office
9	Renato Dias de Brito Gomes	Financial System Organization and Resolution Director	Jair Bolsonaro	April 26, 2022	In office

== Operation ==
Copom's regular meetings are divided into two sessions: the first is reserved for technical presentations on the economic situation and the second is dedicated to deciding on the Selic rate target. Besides the president and directors, the heads of the Central Bank departments participate in the first session of the meeting, which can also be attended by other Central Bank employees when authorized by the president.

On the first day of the meetings, the department leaders present a technical analysis of the situation covering inflation, the level of activity, the evolution of monetary aggregates, public finances, the balance of payments, the international economy, the foreign exchange market, international reserves, the money market, open market operations and general expectations for macroeconomic variables.

On the second day of the meeting, besides the Copom members, the head of Depep participates with no voting rights and gives a technical presentation containing a prospective assessment of inflation. Afterwards, the Copom members, based on an assessment of the macroeconomic scenario and the main associated risks, decide on the Selic rate target by a simple majority vote.

Copom decision announcements are released after the end of the second session of the regular meeting. The reports in Portuguese are published on the Tuesday of the week following each meeting, within the regulatory period of six working days. The technical presentations on the economic situation relating to the first and second day of the meeting are made available after 4 and 8 years respectively. At the end of each quarter (March, June, September and December), Copom publishes the Inflation Report in Portuguese and English, which analyzes Brazil's economic and financial situation in detail and presents its projections for the inflation rate.

== See also ==
- Central Bank of Brazil
