= Unidade real de valor =

Parallel, non-fiat currency used to stabilize Brazilian inflation in 1994

The Unidade Real de Valor (URV; lit. 'Real Value Unit'), was a unit of account (a non-monetary reference currency) used in Brazil. It was created in March 1994, as part of the Plano Real. URV was based on the "Larida Plan", published in 1984 by Pérsio Arida and André Lara Resende.

Its main purpose was to establish a parallel currency to the cruzeiro real, free from the effects of inertial inflation on the latter, which exceeded 1,200% per year prior to the implementation of the new currency, the real.

It was conceived as a temporary instrument to break up the "psychological inertia" that had ingrained in the Brazilian mindset and which caused prices to keep rising as a consequence of subjective estimation of inflation or preemptive adjustment without cost assessment. These phenomena are among the chief characteristics of hyperinflation, resulting from the erosion of confidence on the legal tender. The idea was to let the old currency (the cruzeiro real) fully absorb the effects of hyperinflation while having a new currency to be stable (in nominal terms) by adjusting its exchange rate against the old one.

URVs were quoted in cruzeiros reais and its intrinsic value was pegged to three price indices and had a fixed parity of 1-to-1 to the daily U.S. dollar exchange rate. The exchange rate of URVs to cruzeiros reais was recalculated and published daily by the government.

Prices were quoted both in URVs and cruzeiros reais, but payments had to be made exclusively in cruzeiros reais, since the URV would not become legal tender until July 1, 1994. For instance, banks were required to report balances on accounts in both currencies and contracts had to be rewritten to express prices in URVs.

When the URV (Unit of Real Value) was implemented in March 1994, a retroactive table was also created for salary adjustments based on the URV, dating back to 1993. This value then became the final salary value after the implementation of the new currency. Furthermore, bank slips began to be denominated in URV in June 1994, and post-dated checks dated July 1994 in Cruzeiros Reais were exchanged according to the final conversion value.

The URV was extinguished on July 1, 1994, when it was converted to a new currency, the real, at parity (i.e., 1 real = 1 URV = CR$2,750), effectively breaking the hyperinflationary cycle, bringing stability to the Brazilian currency.

The implementation of the new currency was one of the greatest currency changes in known history, with almost the entirety of the country's legal tender replaced in about 45 days.

Daily value of the URV per week (cruzeiros reais)
1st week	Mon	Tue	Wed	Thu	Fri	2nd week	Mon	Tue	Wed	Thu	Fri
Date Value	28 Feb –	1 Mar; 647.50	2 Mar; 657.50	3 Mar; 667.65	4 Mar; 677.98	Date Value	7 Mar; 688.47	8 Mar; 699.13	9 Mar; 709.96	10 Mar; 720.97	11 Mar; 732.18
3rd week	Mon	Tue	Wed	Thu	Fri	4th week	Mon	Tue	Wed	Thu	Fri
Date Value	14 Mar; 743.76	15 Mar; 755.52	16 Mar; 767.47	17 Mar; 779.61	18 Mar; 792.15	Date Value	21 Mar; 805.53	22 Mar; 819.80	23 Mar; 834.32	24 Mar; 849.10	25 Mar; 864.14
5th week	Mon	Tue	Wed	Thu	Fri	6th week	Mon	Tue	Wed	Thu	Fri
Date Value	28 Mar; 879.45	29 Mar; 895.03	30 Mar; 913.50	31 Mar; 931.05	1 Apr; 931.05	Date Value	4 Apr; 931.05	5 Apr; 948.93	6 Apr; 967.16	7 Apr; 985.74	8 Apr; 1,004.68
7th week	Mon	Tue	Wed	Thu	Fri	8th week	Mon	Tue	Wed	Thu	Fri
Date Value	11 Apr; 1,023.98	12 Apr; 1,043.65	13 Apr; 1,063.70	14 Apr; 1,084.13	15 Apr; 1,104.96	Date Value	18 Apr; 1,126.18	19 Apr; 1,147.81	20 Apr; 1,169.80	21 Apr; 1,191.93	22 Apr; 1,191.93
9th week	Mon	Tue	Wed	Thu	Fri	10th week	Mon	Tue	Wed	Thu	Fri
Date Value	25 Apr; 1,313.97	26 Apr; 1,235.99	27 Apr; 1,258.12	28 Apr; 1,280.19	29 Apr; 1,302.65	Date Value	2 May; 1,323.92	3 May; 1,345.54	4 May; 1,367.56	5 May; 1,389.94	6 May; 1,412.74
11th week	Mon	Tue	Wed	Thu	Fri	12th week	Mon	Tue	Wed	Thu	Fri
Date Value	9 May; 1,435.92	10 May; 1,459.76	11 May; 1,484.27	12 May; 1,509.20	13 May; 1,534.66	Date Value	16 May; 1,560.55	17 May; 1,586.87	18 May; 1,613.64	19 May; 1,640.86	20 May; 1,668.54
13th week	Mon	Tue	Wed	Thu	Fri	14th week	Mon	Tue	Wed	Thu	Fri
Date Value	23 May; 1,696.69	24 May; 1,725.31	25 May; 1,754.41	26 May; 1,784.00	27 May; 1,814.09	Date Value	30 May; 1,844.69	31 May; 1,875.82	1 Jun; 1,908.68	2 Jun; 1,942.11	3 Jun; 1,942.11
15th week	Mon	Tue	Wed	Thu	Fri	16th week	Mon	Tue	Wed	Thu	Fri
Date Value	6 Jun; 1,976.13	7 Jun; 2,010.74	8 Jun; 2,046.38	9 Jun; 2,082.65	10 Jun; 2,119.80	Date Value	13 Jun; 2,157.78	14 Jun; 2,196.55	15 Jun; 2,236.02	16 Jun; 2,276.91	17 Jun; 2,318.55
17th week	Mon	Tue	Wed	Thu	Fri	18th week	Mon	Tue	Wed	Thu	Fri
Date Value	20 Jun; 2,361.49	21 Jun; 2,406.05	22 Jun; 2,452.17	23 Jun; 2,499.18	24 Jun; 2,547.09	Date Value	27 Jun; 2,596.58	28 Jun; 2,647.03	29 Jun; 2,698.46	30 Jun; 2,750.00	1 Jul; R$1.00
Monday values were retroactive to Saturdays and Sundays. Subsequently, a formula was established for retroactive accounting for the previous months and years. Source: Banco Central

== See also ==
- Constant Purchasing Power Accounting
- Inflation accounting
- International Financial Reporting Standards
- Indexed unit of account
