= Paulo César Ximenes =

Brazilian economist

Paulo César Ximenes, full name Paulo César Ximenes Alves Ferreira (born December 30, 1943, in Rio de Janeiro), is a Brazilian economist.

He served as president of the Banco do Brasil and was the 18th president of the Banco Central (analogous to the Federal Reserve in the United States) from 26 March 1993 to 9 September 1993. He has held several government portfolios and has represented Brazil in international conferences in his economist capacity many times.
