= Brady Bonds =

US-dollar-denominated bonds issued in the 1980s and 1990s

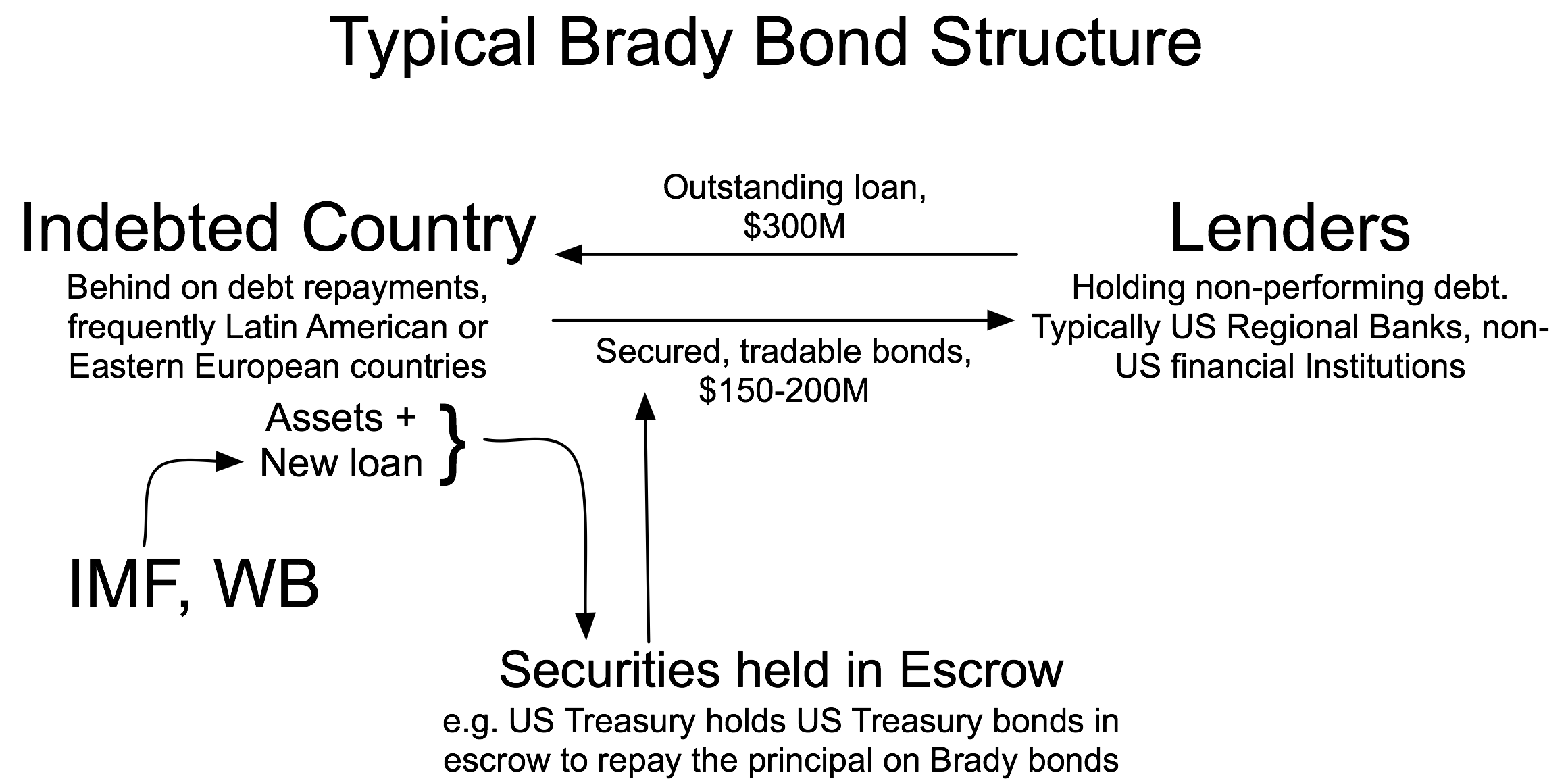
Stakeholders involved in Brady Bond debt restructuring and transactions. Dollar values on outstanding loans and bonds are illustrative; bonds were rarely issued for less than US$125 million, and lenders frequently accepted either 30–50% losses on face value or reduced interest rates fixed at below-market values. According to EMTA, a financial industry trade association, most lenders that accepted Brady bonds for outstanding loans were smaller US commercial banks or non-US financial institutions, rather than "major money center banks."

Brady bonds are dollar-denominated bonds, issued mostly by Latin American countries in the late 1980s. The bonds were named after United States Secretary of the Treasury Nicholas F. Brady, who proposed a novel debt-reduction agreement for developing countries.

== History ==
Brady bonds were created in March 1989 to convert bank loans, mostly in Latin America, into a variety or "menu" of new bonds after many countries defaulted on their debt in the 1980s. At the time, the market for emerging markets' sovereign debt was small and illiquid, and the standardization of emerging-market debt facilitated risk-spreading and trading. In exchange for commercial bank loans, the countries issued new bonds for the principal sum and, in some cases, unpaid interest. Because they were tradable and came with some guarantees, they were sometimes more valuable to the creditors than the original bonds.

The key innovation behind the introduction of Brady Bonds was to allow the commercial banks to exchange their claims on developing countries into tradable instruments, allowing them to get the debt off their balance sheets. This reduced the concentration risk to those banks.

In the second round, creditors converted their existing claims into their choice among the "menu" of options agreed upon in the first round. The penalties for creditors failing to comply with the terms of the deal were never made explicit. Nevertheless, compliance was not an important problem under the Brady Plan. Banks wishing to cease their foreign lending activities tended to choose the exit option under the auspices of the deal.

By offering a "menu" of options, the Brady Plan permitted credit restructurings to be tailored to the heterogeneous preferences of creditors. The terms achieved under the deals indicate that debtors used the menu approach to reduce the cost of debt reduction. Furthermore, it reduced the holdout problem in which certain holders have an incentive not to participate in the restructuring in the hope of getting a better deal.

The principal amount was usually collateralized by specially issued US Treasury 30-year zero-coupon bonds purchased by the debtor country using a combination of International Monetary Fund, World Bank, and the country's own foreign currency reserves. Interest payments on Brady bonds, in some cases, are guaranteed by securities of at least double-A-rated credit quality held with the Federal Reserve Bank of New York.

Countries that participated in the initial round of issuing Brady bonds were Argentina, Brazil, Bulgaria, Costa Rica, Dominican Republic, Ecuador, Mexico, Morocco, Nigeria, Philippines, Poland, Uruguay, and Venezuela.

Participating countries were to liberalize their economies in order to qualify for Brady Bonds.

The Brady Bonds were credited for resolving the Latin American debt crisis, but did not prevent future looming debt crises.

== Types ==
There were two main types of Brady bonds:

- Par bonds were issued to the same value as the original loan, but the coupon on the bonds is below market rate; principal and interest payments are usually guaranteed.
- Discount bonds were issued at a discount to the original value of the loan, but the coupon is at market rate; principal and interest payments are usually guaranteed.

Other, less common, types include front-loaded interest-reduction bonds (FLIRB), new-money bonds, debt-conversion bonds (DCB), and past-due interest bonds (PDI). Brady Bond negotiations generally involved some form of "haircut." In other words, the value of the bonds resulting from the restructurings was less than the face value of the claims before the restructurings.

Guarantees attached to Brady bonds included collateral to guarantee the principal, rolling interest guarantees, and value recovery rights. Not all Brady bonds would necessarily have all those forms of guarantee, and the specifics would vary from issuance to issuance.

== Current status ==
Although the Brady bond process ended during the 1990s, many of the innovations introduced in these restructurings (call options embedded in the bonds, "stepped" coupons, pars and discounts) were retained in the later sovereign restructurings in, for example, Russia and Ecuador. The latter country, in 1999, became the first country to default on its Brady bonds. In 2003, Mexico became the first country to retire its Brady debt. The Philippines bought back all of its Brady bonds in May 2007, joining Colombia, Brazil, Venezuela, and Mexico as countries that have retired the bonds.

== See also ==
- Debt
- Debt relief
- Sovereign default
