= Central Bank of Brazil =

Monetary Authority of Brazil

Central Bank of Brazil Banco Central do Brasil

- Headquarters in Brasília, Brasil
- Central bank of: Brazil
- Headquarters: SBS, Quadra 03, Bloco B Brasília, Federal District
- Coordinates: 15°48′11″S 47°53′08″W
- Established: 31 December 1964 (61 years ago)
- Ownership: Independent entity
- President: Gabriel Galípolo
- Currency: Brazilian real BRL (ISO 4217)
- Reserves: ▲US$ 372.61 billion (August 2026)
- Interest rate target: 13.75%
- Website: www.bcb.gov.br

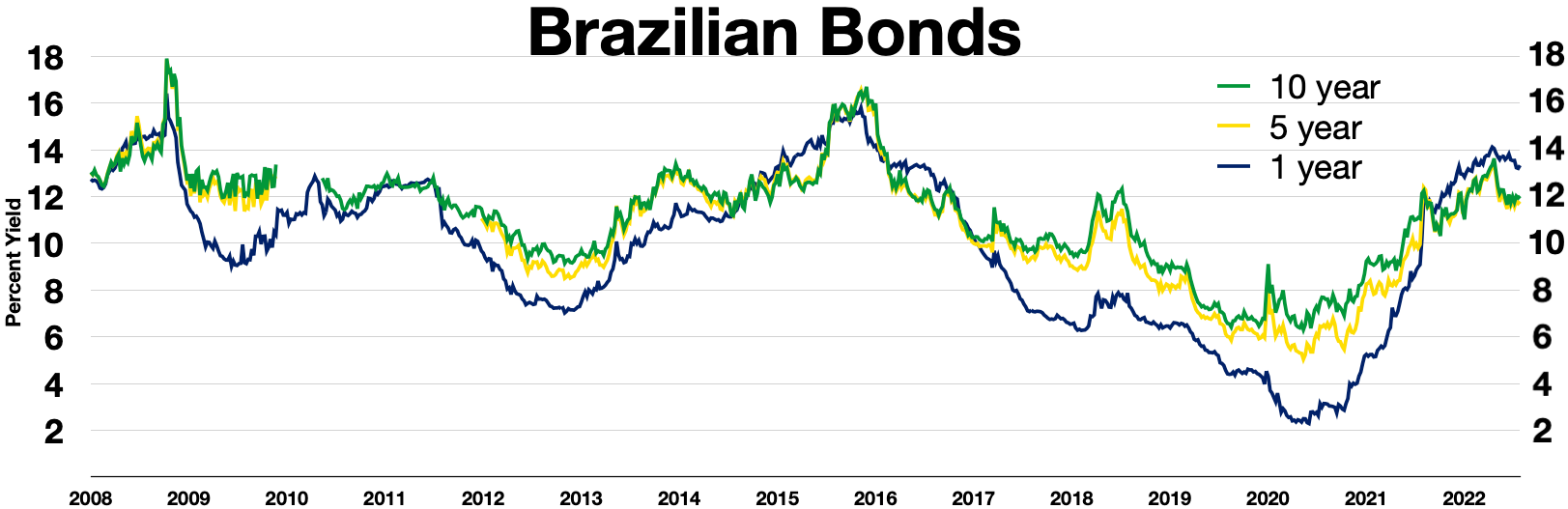
Brazilian bonds had an Inverted yield curve starting in August 2014 as part of the 2014 Brazilian economic crisis 10 year bond 5 year bond 1 year bond

The Central Bank of Brazil (BCB; Portuguese: Banco Central do Brasil, pronounced [ˈbɐ̃ku sẽˈtɾaw du bɾaˈziw]) is the central bank of Brazil. It is the country's chief monetary authority and is responsible for maintaining the stability of the national currency's purchasing power. The bank was established on 31 December 1964.

The Central Bank of Brazil is not affiliated with any ministry and, like other central banks, exercises monetary authority in the country. It was created through the merger of three institutions: the Superintendência da Moeda e do Crédito (SUMOC), the Bank of Brazil (BB), and the National Treasury. One of the main instruments of Brazil's monetary policy is the bank's benchmark overnight interest rate, known as the SELIC rate, which is set by the bank's Monetary Policy Committee (Copom). The bank is also active in promoting financial inclusion and is a leading member of the Alliance for Financial Inclusion.

It was one of the original 17 regulatory institutions to make national commitments to financial inclusion under the Maya Declaration. Since 25 February 2021, the bank has been institutionally independent from the federal government.

== Independence of the Central Bank ==
On 3 November 2020, the bill of the Independence of Central Bank passed the Senate, by 56 votes to 12.

And on 10 February 2021, in the Chamber of Deputies was approved by 339 votes in favor and 114 against without changes, going to President Jair Bolsonaro's sanction, generating the Federal Complementary Law No. 179 of 24 February 2021.

With the Federal Complementary Law No. 179 of 24 February 2021, it became autonomous, in addition to gaining a new organizational structure.

== Presidents ==
=== Appointed by the Executive ===
No.	Portrait	President	Took office	Left office	Time in office	Appointed by
1	Dênio Chagas Nogueira	Dênio Chagas Nogueira (1920–1997)	12 April 1965	21 March 1967	1 year, 343 days	Castelo Branco
2	Rui Aguiar da Silva Leme	Rui Aguiar da Silva Leme (1925–1997)	31 March 1967	12 February 1968	318 days	Costa e Silva
–	Ary Burger	Ary Burger (1921–2010); Acting	12 February 1968	20 February 1968	8 days	Costa e Silva
3	Ernane Galvêas	Ernane Galvêas (1922–2022)	20 February 1968	15 March 1974	6 years, 23 days	Costa e Silva
4	Paulo Hortêncio Pereira Lima	Paulo Hortêncio Pereira Lima (born 1930)	15 March 1974	15 March 1979	5 years, 0 days	Ernesto Geisel
5	Carlos Brandão	Carlos Brandão (1928–2016)	15 March 1979	17 August 1979	155 days	João Figueiredo
6	Ernane Galvêas	Ernane Galvêas (1922–2022)	17 August 1979	18 January 1980	154 days	João Figueiredo
7	Carlos Geraldo Langoni	Carlos Geraldo Langoni (1944–2021)	18 January 1980	5 September 1983	3 years, 230 days	João Figueiredo
8	Affonso Celso Pastore	Affonso Celso Pastore (1939–2024)	5 September 1983	15 March 1985	1 year, 191 days	João Figueiredo
9	Antônio Carlos Lemgruber	Antônio Carlos Lemgruber (1947–2011)	15 March 1985	28 August 1985	166 days	José Sarney
10	Fernando Carlos Bracher	Fernando Carlos Bracher (1935–2019)	28 August 1985	11 February 1987	1 year, 167 days	José Sarney
11	Francisco Gros	Francisco Gros (1942–2010)	11 February 1987	30 April 1987	78 days	José Sarney
–	Lycio de Faria	Lycio de Faria (born 1929); Acting	30 April 1987	4 May 1987	4 days	José Sarney
12	Fernando Milliet	Fernando Milliet (born 1942)	4 May 1987	9 March 1988	310 days	José Sarney
13	Elmo de Araújo Camões	Elmo de Araújo Camões (1927–2022)	9 March 1988	22 June 1989	1 year, 105 days	José Sarney
14	Wadico Waldir Bucchi	Wadico Waldir Bucchi (born 1951)	22 June 1989	15 March 1990	266 days	José Sarney
15	Ibrahim Eris	Ibrahim Eris (born 1944)	15 March 1990	17 May 1991	1 year, 63 days	Fernando Collor de Mello
16	Francisco Gros	Francisco Gros (1942–2010)	17 May 1991	13 November 1992	1 year, 180 days	Fernando Collor
17	Gustavo Loyola	Gustavo Loyola (born 1952)	13 November 1992	29 March 1993	136 days	Itamar Franco
18	Paulo César Ximenes	Paulo César Ximenes (born 1943)	29 March 1993	9 September 1993	164 days	Itamar Franco
19	Pedro Malan	Pedro Malan (born 1943)	9 September 1993	1 January 1995	1 year, 114 days	Itamar Franco
–	Gustavo Franco	Gustavo Franco (born 1956); Acting	1 January 1995	11 January 1995	10 days	Fernando Henrique Cardoso
20	Pérsio Arida	Pérsio Arida (born 1952)	11 January 1995	13 June 1995	153 days	Fernando Henrique Cardoso
21	Gustavo Loyola	Gustavo Loyola (born 1952)	13 June 1995	20 August 1997	2 years, 68 days	Fernando Henrique Cardoso
22	Gustavo Franco	Gustavo Franco (born 1956)	20 August 1997	4 March 1999	1 year, 196 days	Fernando Henrique Cardoso
23	Armínio Fraga	Armínio Fraga (born 1957)	4 March 1999	1 January 2003	3 years, 303 days	Fernando Henrique Cardoso
24	Henrique Meirelles	Henrique Meirelles (born 1945)	1 January 2003	1 January 2011	8 years, 0 days	Luiz Inácio Lula da Silva
25	Alexandre Tombini	Alexandre Tombini (born 1963)	1 January 2011	9 June 2016	5 years, 160 days	Dilma Rousseff
26	Ilan Goldfajn	Ilan Goldfajn (born 1966)	9 June 2016	27 February 2019	2 years, 263 days	Michel Temer
27	Roberto Campos Neto	Roberto Campos Neto (born 1969)	28 February 2019	1 January 2021	1 year, 308 days	Jair Bolsonaro

=== Under Autonomous Election ===
No.	Portrait	President	Took office	Left office	Time in office	Elected during
27	Roberto Campos Neto	Roberto Campos Neto (born 1969)	1 January 2021	31 December 2024	3 years, 365 days	Jair Bolsonaro
28	Gabriel Galípolo	Gabriel Galípolo (born 1982)	1 January 2025	Incumbent	1 year, 285 days	Luiz Inácio Lula da Silva

== See also ==
- Brazilian real
- Federal institutions of Brazil
- Payment system
- Real-time gross settlement
- List of central banks
- List of financial supervisory authorities by country
