= History of Brazil (1985–present) =

Contemporary epoch in the history of Brazil

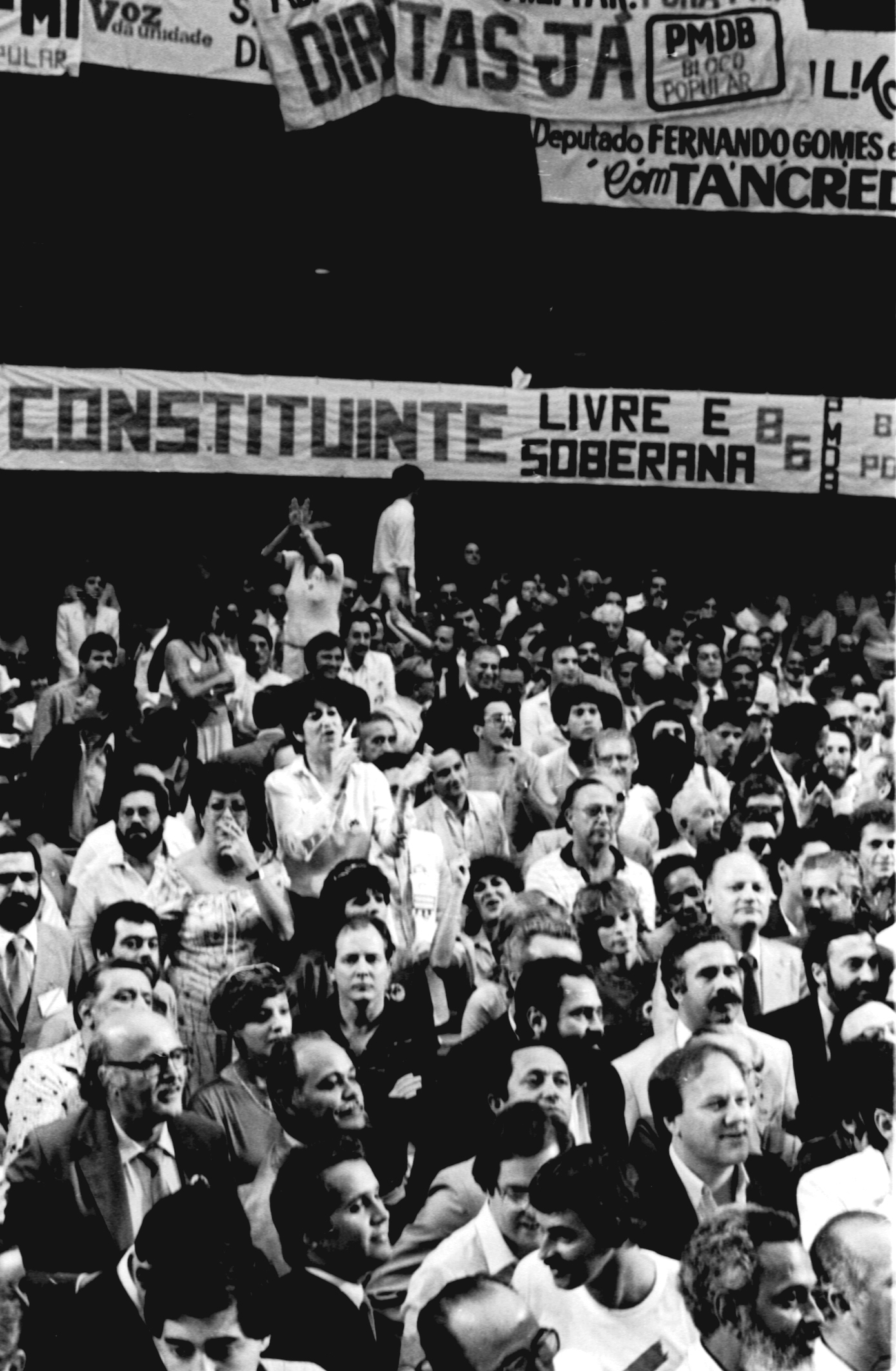
Diretas Já movement

Brazilian history from 1985 to the present, also known as the Sixth Brazilian Republic or New Republic, is the contemporary epoch in the history of Brazil, beginning when civilian government was restored after a 21-year-long military dictatorship established after the 1964 coup d'état. The negotiated transition to democracy reached its climax with the indirect election of Tancredo Neves by Congress. Neves belonged to the Brazilian Democratic Movement Party (MDB), the former controlled opposition to the military regime. He was the first civilian president to be elected since 1964.

Neves was set to take over from general João Figueiredo, the last of the military presidents appointed by their predecessor. The transition was hailed as the dawn of a New Republic (Nova República) in contrast with Old Republic (República Velha), the first epoch of the Brazilian Republic, from 1889 until 1930. It became synonymous with the contemporary phase of the Brazilian Republic and the political institutions established in the wake of the country's re-democratization.

President-elect Tancredo Neves fell ill on the eve of his inauguration and could not attend it. His running mate, José Sarney, was inaugurated as vice president and served in Neves' stead as acting president. As Neves died without having ever taken the oath of office, Sarney then succeeded to the presidency. The first phase of the New Republic, ranging from the inauguration of José Sarney in 1985 until the inauguration of Fernando Collor in 1990, is often considered a transitional period as the 1967–1969 constitution remained in effect, the executive still had veto powers, and the president was able to rule by decree. The transition was considered definitive after Brazil's current constitution, drawn up in 1988, entered full effect in 1990.

In 1986, elections were called for a National Constituent Assembly that would draft and adopt a new Constitution for the country. The Constituent Assembly began deliberations in February 1987 and concluded its work on 5 October 1988. Brazil's current Constitution was promulgated in 1988 and completed the democratic institutions. The new Constitution replaced the authoritarian legislation that still remained from the military regime.

In 1989 Brazil held its first elections for president by direct popular ballot since the 1964 coup. Fernando Collor won the election and was inaugurated on 15 March 1990, as the first president elected under the 1988 Constitution.

Since then, eight presidential terms have elapsed, without rupture to the constitutional order:

- the first term was served by presidents Collor and Itamar Franco. Collor was impeached on charges of corruption in 1992 and resigned the presidency, being succeeded by Itamar Franco, his vice president;
- the second and third terms corresponded to Fernando Henrique Cardoso's administration, from 1995 to 2002;
- in the fourth and fifth presidential terms Luiz Inácio Lula da Silva served as president, from 2003 to 2010;
- the sixth term was Dilma Rousseff's first administration, from 2011 to 2014;
- the seventh term was started following Rousseff's 2014 reelection. Her second term was due to end in 2018, but in 2016, she was impeached based on accusations for violations of budget and fiscal responsibility laws. Her vice-president, Michel Temer, succeeded her on 31 August 2016.
- the eighth term was Jair Bolsonaro's administration, from 2019 to 2022;
- the ninth and current term is Luiz Inácio Lula da Silva's third term as president, expected to last from 2023 to 2026.

== Transition towards democracy ==
The last military president, João Figueiredo signed a general amnesty into law and turned Geisel's "distension" into a gradual opening of the political system, saying he wanted "to make this country a democracy".

The transition towards democracy that ended the military regime in 1985 and spurred the adoption of a new, democratic, Constitution in 1988, was, however, troubled.

Hard-liners reacted to the opening with a series of terrorist bombings. In April 1981 after a long string of bombings and other violence a bomb went off prematurely and killed one of the men in the car with it and badly injured the other. They were shown to be working with the DOI-CODI "under the direct orders of the "Command of the First Army" in terrorism, but nobody was punished. The incident and the regime's inaction strengthened the public's resolve to end military rule. Moreover, Figueiredo faced other significant problems, such as soaring inflation, declining productivity, and mounting foreign debt.

== 1980s ==
=== The "lost decade": stagnation, inflation, and crisis ===
Political liberalization and the declining world economy contributed to Brazil's economic and social problems. In 1978 and 1980, huge strikes took place in the industrial ring around São Paulo. Protesters asserted that wage increases indexed to the inflation rate were far below an acceptable standard of living. Union leaders, including the future three-time presidential candidate and president Luíz Inácio da Silva, were arrested for violating national security laws. The International Monetary Fund (IMF) imposed a painful austerity program on Brazil. Under that program, Brazil was required to hold down wages to fight inflation. In the north, northeast, and even in Rio Grande do Sul, impoverished rural people occupied unused private land, forcing the government to create a new land reform ministry. Tension with the Roman Catholic Church, the major voice for societal change, peaked in the early 1980s with the expulsion of foreign priests involved in political and land reform issues.

To attack the soaring debt, Figueiredo's administration stressed exports — food, natural resources, automobiles, arms, clothing, shoes, even electricity — and expanded petroleum exploration by foreign companies. In foreign relations, the objective was to establish ties with any country that would contribute to Brazilian economic development. Washington was kept at a certain distance, and the north–south dialogue was emphasized.

In 1983, the economy floundered as the gross domestic product declined by 5.0%, the impact of which was accelerated by rising inflation and the failure of political leadership. Figueiredo's heart condition led to bypass surgery in the United States, removing him from control of the situation. In an impressive display, millions of Brazilians took to the streets in all the major cities demanding a direct vote (Diretas Já!) in the choice of the next president. In April 1984, Congress failed to achieve the necessary numbers to give the people their wish, and the choice was left to an electoral college. Figueiredo did not act forcefully to back a preference, so it became a scramble as candidates pursued the collegial votes.

=== Transitional period: Tancredo's election and the Sarney years ===
The current Brazilian constitution

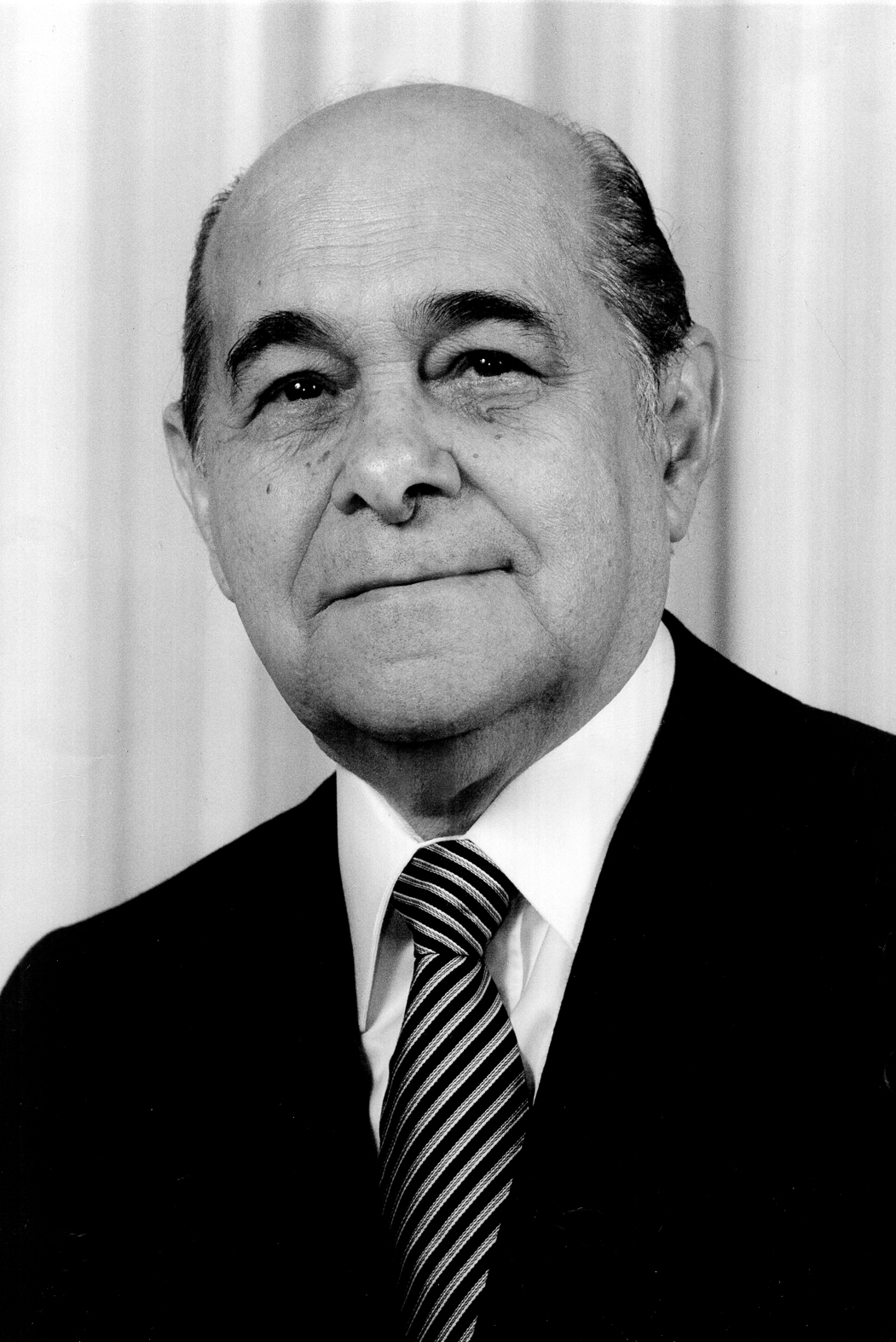
President Neves would be the first elected president since the Brazilian military coup, however, the president died before inauguration

In 1984, many public demonstrations were held in major Brazilian cities which made it clear that military rule could not continue. Brazilians started to demand change in the electoral system, aiming to directly elect the President (Diretas Já). As public pressure built up, the opposition Brazilian Democratic Movement Party (Partido do Movimento Democrático Brasileiro, PMDB) proposed a legislation to implement this change (Proposta de Emenda Constitucional Dante de Oliveira). As Congress was controlled by the pro-government Democratic Social Party (PDS, formerly ARENA), the law failed to pass.

Tancredo Neves of Minas Gerais, Getúlio Vargas' minister of justice in the 1950s, and former federal deputy, senator, and prime minister, seized the momentum. Neves had a reputation for honesty and was able to build up an alliance between the PMDB and defectors from the PDS who founded the Liberal Front Party (PFL). The Democratic Alliance (Aliança Democrática) presented itself as supporting 1984 demands for political change and the end of military rule.

The party presented Neves as an opposition candidate against Paulo Maluf. Neves was elected by a majority vote of the Parliament on January 15, 1985. However, Neves collapsed the night before his inauguration in March, and died on April 21, so the presidency passed to Vice President José Sarney (president, 1985–90), long-time supporter of the military regime. The hope that 1985 would provide a quick transition to a new regime faded as Brazilians watched the turn of events in a state of shock. Like the regime changes of 1822, 1889, 1930, 1946, and 1964, the 1985 change also proved to be long and difficult.

Sarney's government fulfilled Tancredo's promises of amending the Constitution inherited from the military regime and calling elections for a National Constituent Assembly with full powers to draft and enact a new democratic constitution for the country. Ulysses Guimarães, who led the civilian resistance to the military rule, was chosen by his fellow Assembly members to preside over the Constituent Assembly, which sat in session from February 1987 to October 1988.

The Constituent Assembly proclaimed a new constitution in October 1988 and restored civil and public rights such as freedom of speech, independent public prosecutors (Ministério Público), economic freedom, direct and free elections and universal healthcare. It also de-centralized government, empowering local and state governments.

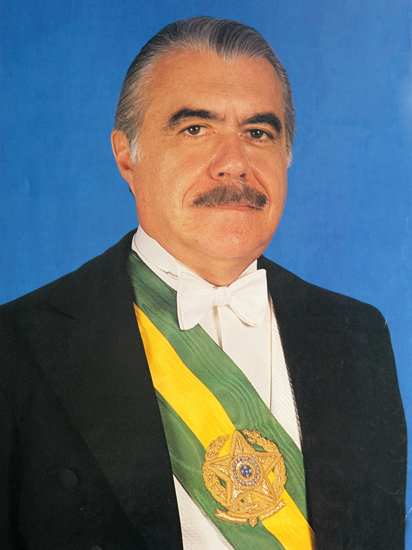
The president Sarney

As the political transition developed, the economy suffered high inflation and stagnation. Sarney tried to control inflation with many economic plans: Plano Cruzado 1, Plano Cruzado 2, Plano Verão. All of them included government price controls, price freezes and ultimately a change in the national currency. During Sarney's presidency, Brazil had three currency units: the cruzeiro, the cruzado and the cruzado novo. Economic domestic troubles led to default on Brazil's international debt in 1988. This closed international financial markets for Brazil and its economic situation worsened.

Despite the initial decrease, inflation returned higher than before the economic plans, reaching 84% a month in 1990. The government's inability to deal with inflation ultimately led parties that had led the political transition to lose the 1989 elections, the first elections under the new Constitution and the first presidential elections to take place by direct popular ballot since the 1964 military coup.

== 1990s ==
=== Collor and Franco administrations (1990–1994) ===
The first direct presidential election after 29 years was held on October 15, 1989 (first round) and November 15, 1989 (second round). Fernando Collor de Mello won the runoff election with 53% of the vote for a five-year term.

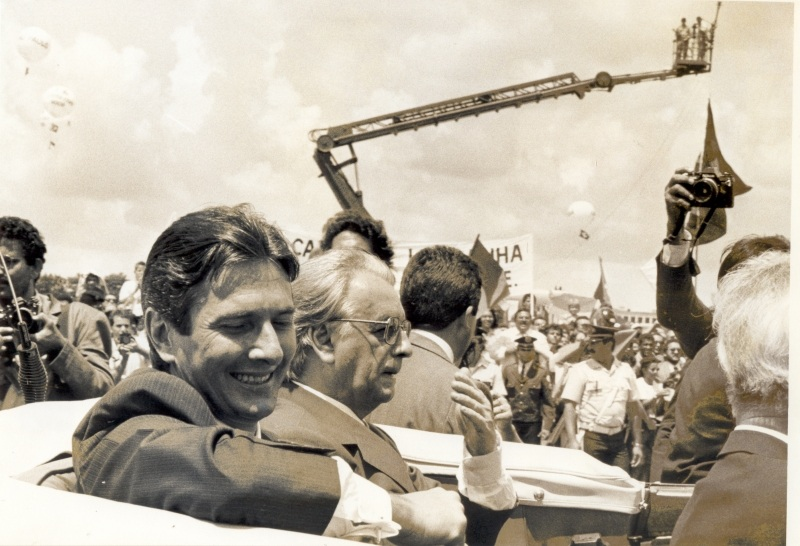
Collor (smiling) and Franco (glasses) during the presidential inauguration on March 15, 1990 in Brasília Federal District. After the impeachment of Collor, his former vice-president took office

Collor's agenda focused on fighting corruption from Sarney's administration and completing the transition from the 21 years of military rule to civilian government. Economic changes aimed to control soaring inflation and modernization.

Although he had massive support amongst the voters, the administration had a small parliamentary base as Collor's recently founded party had few deputies and no senators and faced fierce opposition from parties that had splintered from the Democratic Alliance: the Brazilian Democratic Movement Party (PMDB), Liberals (PFL), and Social Democrats (Brazilian Social Democracy Party, PSDB).

His first act was known as Plano Collor: all savings accounts and financial investment were frozen, and the national currency was changed from the cruzado novo to the cruzeiro (NCz$1,000 = Cr$1). Plano Collor initially succeeded, but after six months failed in its primary goal, as inflation accelerated again. This started to erode Collor's prestige. Economic changes included lifting import barriers, exposing local companies to international competition. Many companies went bankrupt or were sold, unemployment grew and support for the government deteriorated.

Parliamentary elections were held on October 15, 1990, and the government failed to win a reliable base in Congress and the president began to lose political support.

In May 1991, Collor's brother Pedro Collor accused him of corruption, specifically of condoning an influence peddling scheme run by his campaign treasurer, Paulo César Farias. Congress and the Federal Police of Brazil began an investigation. Some months later, with the investigation progressing and under fire, Collor went on national television to ask for the people's support, by going out on the street and protesting against coup forces. On August 11, 1992, students organized by the União Nacional dos Estudantes (UNE), thousands of students protested on the streets against Collor. They often painted their faces, frequently in a mixture of the colors of the flag and protest-black, which led to calling them "Cara-pintada" (Painted Faces).

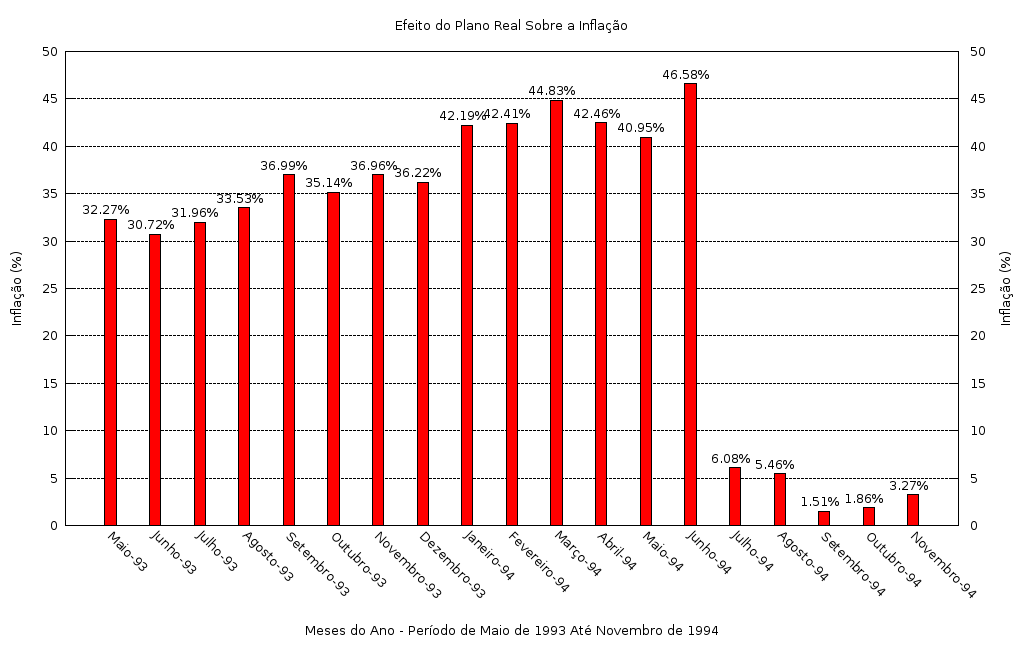
The brazilian real was created in Franco's administration and the plan basically saved the economy from its former hyperinflation

On August 26, 1992, the final congressional inquiry report was released, where it was proven that Fernando Collor had personal expenses paid for by money raised by Paulo César Farias through his influence peddling scheme. Impeachment proceedings began in the lower house of congress on September 29, 1992. Collor was impeached, and subsequently removed from office by a vote of 441 for and 38 votes against. Fernando Collor resigned his term in office just before the Brazilian Senate was to vote for his impeachment. The senate voted to impeach him anyway, suspending his political rights for eight years.

His vice-president, Itamar Franco, assumed the presidency for the remainder of Collor's term.

Franco distanced himself from Collor and made arrangements for a coalition government that included the main leaders from the PMDB, PFL, and PSDB. Franco appointed Fernando Henrique Cardoso as Minister of Treasury and gave him the responsibility of controlling inflation – the average annual inflation rate from 1990 to 1995 was 764%. Cardoso put together a successful stabilization program, Plano Real, that brought inflation to 6% annually. Franco's approval ratings rose and he supported Cardoso to succeed him.

A referendum held in 1993 allowed the people to decide the form of government of the state (monarchy or republic) for the first time since the proclamation of the Republic in 1889; the republican form of government prevailed. In the same referendum, the Brazilian people was able to choose again, for the first time since 1963, the system of Government (parliamentary or presidential) and the model of a presidential executive was retained. According to the results of the popular vote, only minor changes were made to the institutional framework of the State in the subsequent Constitutional Revision, including the adoption of a Constitutional Amendment that reduced the presidential term of office from five to four years.

In the October 3, 1994 presidential elections, Fernando Henrique Cardoso was elected with 54% of the votes.

=== FHC administration (1995–2002) ===
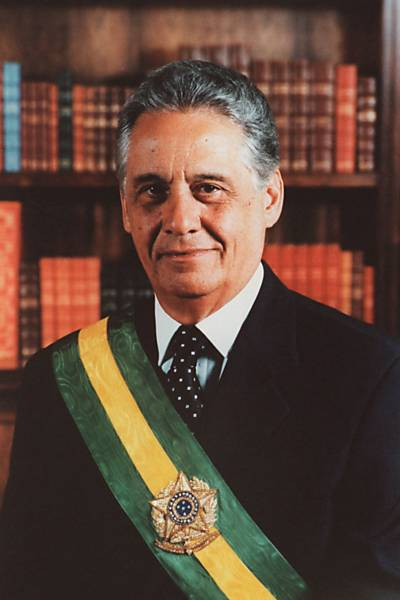
President Fernando Henrique Cardoso (1995–2002)

Fernando Henrique Cardoso started his first term on January 1, 1995, and was reelected in 1998. President Cardoso sought to establish the basis for long-term stability and growth and to reduce Brazil's extreme socioeconomic imbalances. His proposals to Congress included constitutional amendments to open the Brazilian economy to greater foreign investment and to implement sweeping reforms – including social security, government administration, and taxation – to reduce excessive public sector spending and improve government efficiency.

His government is credited with providing economic stability to a country marred by years of hyperinflation. At the same time the Mexican, 1997 Asian, 1998 Russian and 1999–2002 Argentinian economic crises diminished the prospects for economic growth during his presidency.

During his administration many state-owned companies were privatized, and agencies created for the first time to regulate many sectors of industry such as energy, oil, and aviation. Cardoso's administration also put a strong focus on external affairs. In addition to acceding to the WTO and participating in the Uruguay Round, Brazil participated in the INTERFET peacekeeping mission to East Timor.

== 2000s ==
=== First Lula administration (2003–2010) ===
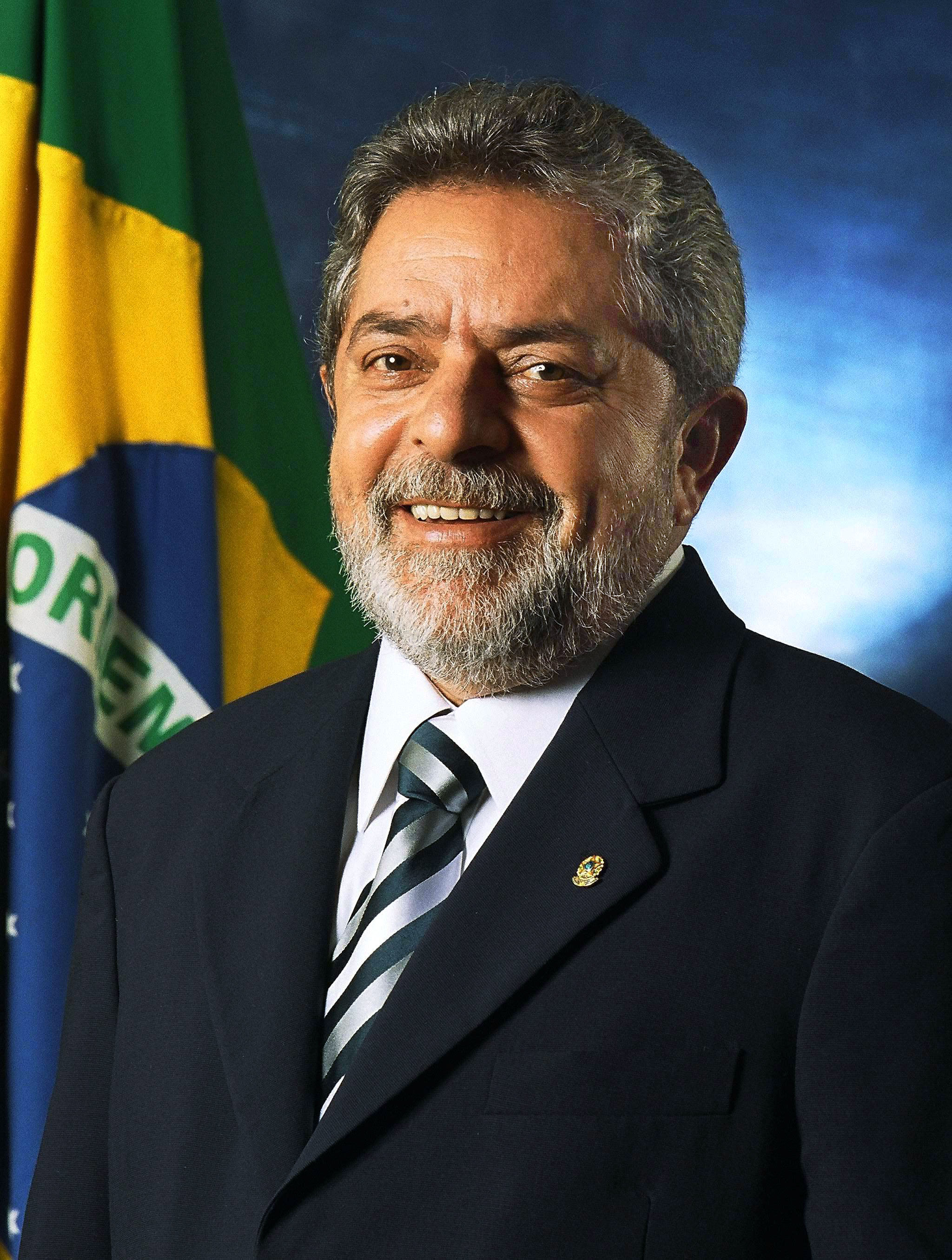
President Luíz Inácio Lula da Silva (2003–2010)

In 2002, Luiz Inácio Lula da Silva of the Workers' Party (PT) won the presidency with more than 60% of the national vote. On 1 January 2003, Lula was sworn in as the first ever elected leftist President of Brazil. In the first months of his term, inflation rose perilously, reflecting the markets' uncertainty about the government's monetary policy. However, the markets' confidence in the government was regained as Lula chose to maintain his predecessor's policies, meaning the continuation of Central Bank's task of keeping inflation down. Since then, the country has undergone considerable economic growth and employment expansion. On the other hand, Lula's mainstream economic policies disappointed his most radical leftist allies, which led to a schism in the PT (Workers' Party) that resulted in the creation of PSOL.

In 2005, Roberto Jefferson, chairman of the Brazilian Labour Party (PTB), was implicated in a bribery case. As a Parliamentary Commission of Inquiry was set up, Jefferson testified that the MPs were being paid monthly stipends to vote for government-backed legislation. In August of the same year, after further investigation, campaign manager Duda Mendonça admitted that he had used illegal undeclared money to finance the PT electoral victory of 2002. The money in both cases was found to have originated from private sources as well as from the advertising budget of state-owned enterprises headed by political appointees, both laundered through Duda's Mendonça advertising agency. These incidents were dubbed the Mensalão scandal. On August 24, 2007, the Brazilian Supreme Court (Supremo Tribunal Federal) accepted the indictments of 40 individuals relating to the Mensalão scandal, most of whom were former or current federal deputies, and all of whom were still allies of the Brazilian president.

The loss of support resulting from these scandals was outweighed by the president's popularity among voters of the lower classes, whose income per capita was increased as a consequence of higher employment, the expansion of domestic credit to consumers and government social welfare programs. The stable and solid economic situation of the country, which Brazil had not experienced in the previous 20 years, with fast growth in production both for internal consumers and exports as well as a soft but noticeable decrease in social inequality, may also partially explain the popularity of Lula's administration even after several corruption scandals involving important politicians connected to Lula and to PT. Hence Lula's re-election in 2006: After almost winning in the first round, Lula won the runoff against Geraldo Alckmin of the PSDB (Brazilian Social Democracy Party), by 20 million votes.

Following Lula's second victory, his approval ratings rose again, fueled by continued of the economical and social achievements, to a record 80%, the highest for a Brazilian president since the end of the military regime. The focus of Lula's second term was further stimulation of the economy by investments in infrastructure and measures to keep expanding domestic credit to producers, industry, commerce and consumers alike. In 2009, Brazil's economic rise was temporarily halted by the 2008 financial crisis, forcing the government to implement a temporary tax relief policy in strategic segments of the economy like automobiles and construction. These measures helped the country prevent a long-term recession and ensured a quick recovery to Brazil's economic ascension.

Another mark of Lula's second term was his effort to expand Brazil's political influence worldwide, especially after G20 (in which Brazil and other emerging economies participate) replaced the G8 as the main world forum of discussions. Just like his predecessor, he was an active defender of reform of the United Nations Security Council. Brazil is one of four nations (the others being Germany, India and Japan) officially coveting a permanent seat on the council. Lula saw himself as a friendly, peacemaker and conciliator head of state. Managing to befriend leaders of rival countries from the likes of Presidents George W. Bush and Barack Obama from the United States to Venezuelan leader Hugo Chávez, Cuban former president Fidel Castro, President of Bolivia Evo Morales, and Iranian President Mahmoud Ahmadinejad, fueling protests inside and outside the country due to Ahmadinejad's polemical anti-Semitic statements. Lula took part in a deal with the governments of Turkey and Iran regarding Iran's nuclear program despite the United States' (among other nuclear powers) desire to strengthen the sanctions against the country, fearing the possibility of Iran develop nuclear weapons.

During the Lula administration the Brazilian Army's most important assignment was being the main force of the United Nations Stabilization Mission in Haiti, established to bring aid to the Haitian population, and it suffered many casualties during the 2010 Haiti earthquake which claimed hundreds of thousands of lives.

== 2010s ==
=== Rousseff administration (2011–2016) ===
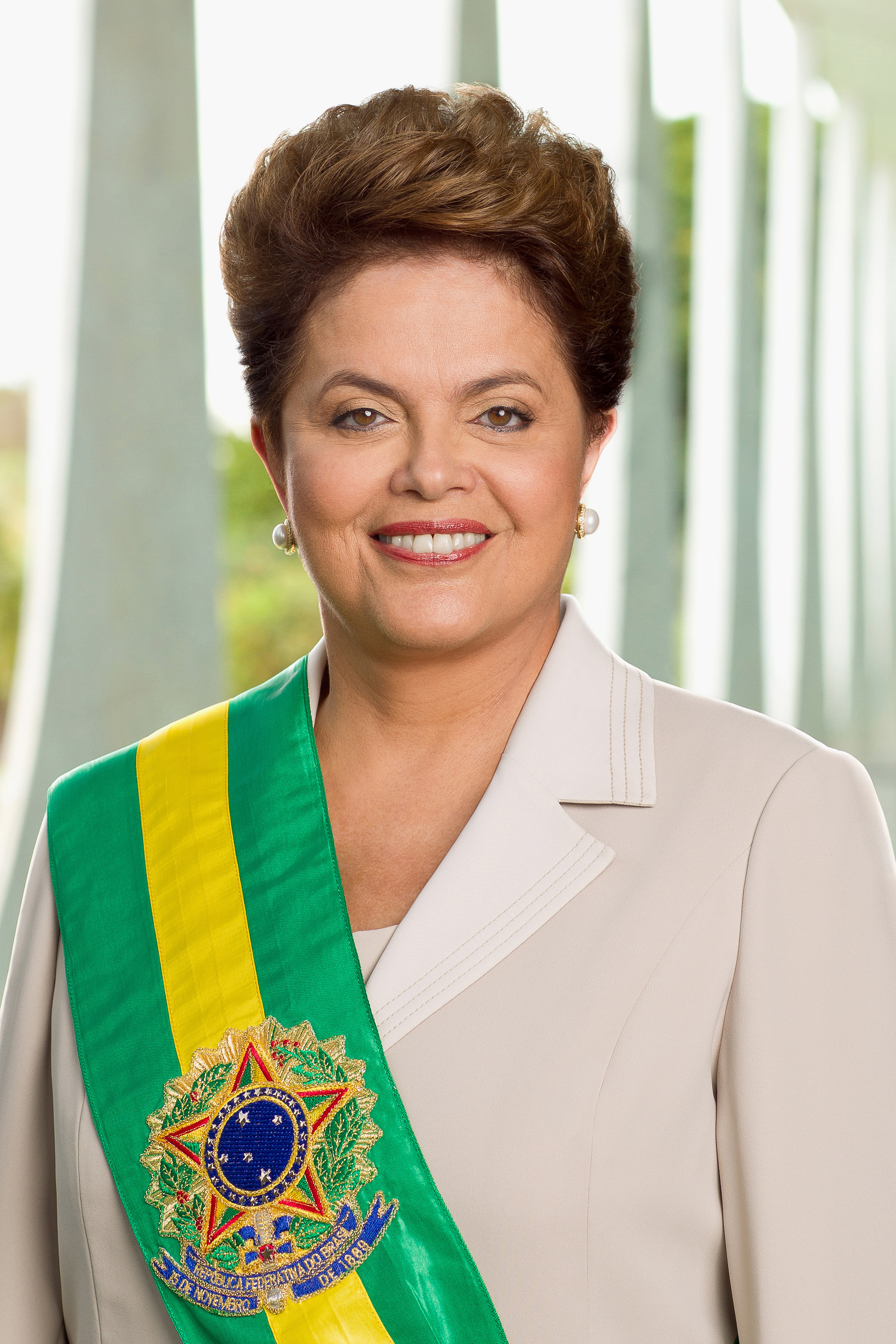
President Dilma Rousseff (2011–2016)

On October 31, 2010, Dilma Rousseff, also from the Worker's Party, was the first woman elected President of Brazil, with her term beginning in the January 1, 2011. In her victory speech, Rousseff, who had also been a key member of Lula's administration, made clear that her mission during her term would be to continue her predecessor's policies to mitigate poverty and ensure continued economic growth.

Challenges faced by Rousseff in her first term included managing infrastructure projects to increase economic activity, with special attention to the twelve cities that would host the upcoming 2014 FIFA World Cup in Brazil, especially Rio de Janeiro, a special case as it would also hold the 2016 Summer Olympics, as well as measures to protect the Brazilian economy from the Euro area crisis and the United States debt-ceiling crisis of 2011. These contributed to reducing the growth of national GDP during the first half of her term, compared to her predecessor's tenure.

In June 2011, Rouseff announced a program called "Brasil Sem Miséria" (Brazil Without Poverty), with the ambitious goal of drastically reducing absolute poverty in Brazil by the end of her term. Poverty afflicted 16 million people, a little less than a tenth of the population. The program involved broadening the Bolsa Família social welfare program and creating new job opportunities and establishing professional certification programs. In 2012, another program labeled "Brasil Carinhoso" (Caring Brazil) was launched with the objective of providing extra care to all children in Brazil who lived below the poverty threshold.

Despite criticism from the domestic and international press regarding lower-than-expected economic results achieved during her first term as head of the government and of the measures taken to solve it, Rouseff's approval rates reached levels higher than any other president since the end of the military regime until a wave of protests struck the country in mid 2013 reflecting dissatisfaction from the people with current transport, healthcare and education policies, among other issues affecting the popularity not only of the president, but of several other governors and mayors from key areas in the country as well.

In 2014, Rousseff won a second term by a narrow margin, but failed to prevent her popularity from falling. In June 2015, her approval dropped to less than 10%, after another wave of protests, this time organized by opponents who wanted her out of power, amid revelations that numerous politicians, including some from her party, were being investigated for accepting bribes from the state-owned energy company Petrobras from 2003 to 2010, while she was on the company's board of directors.

=== Temer administration (2016–2018) ===
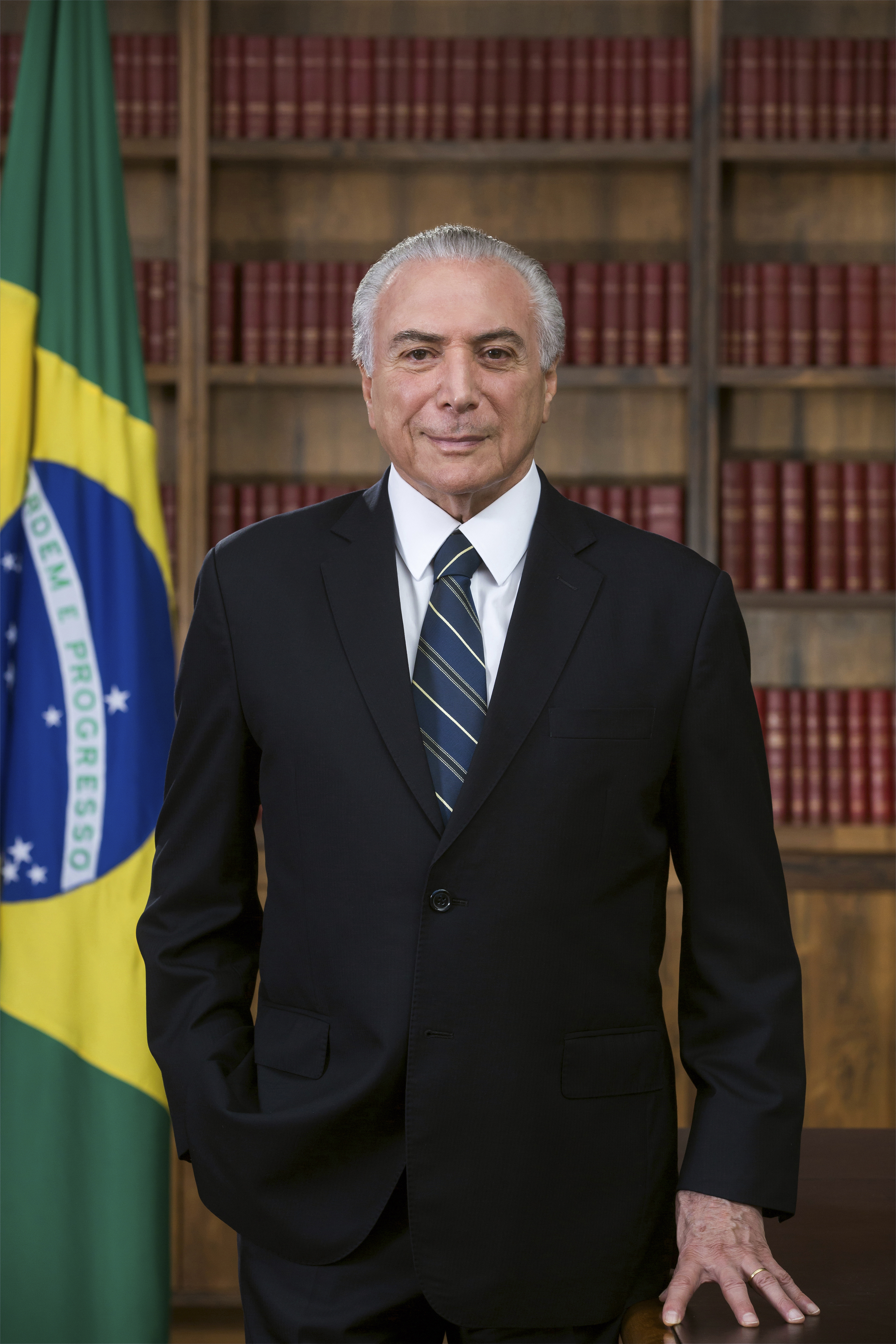
President Temer (2016–2018)

After a process of impeachment opened against Rousseff in late 2015 culminated with her temporarily removed from power on 12 May 2016, vice-president Michel Temer took office until the final trial was concluded on 31 August 2016, when Rousseff was officially impeached and Temer was sworn president until the end of the term. During the impeachment process, Brazil hosted the 2016 Summer Olympics.

Temer took office during the financial crisis that had begun in 2014. He set a reformist agenda, approving as his two main measures the Constitutional Amendment of the Public Expenditure Cap, which set a limit for public spending, and the 2017 labor reform. In May 2017, generalized corruption accusations reached many politicians and parties in Brazil, including the president. In June, he was charged for corruption by prosecutor general Rodrigo Janot due to bribery allegations. Temer became the first incumbent president to be formally accused of crimes, but ultimately had the charge rejected by Congress in August 2017.

In 2016, former president Lula expressed intent to run for the presidency again in 2018, but became the subject of investigations under Operation Car Wash. He was sentenced in May 2017 for money laundering and passive corruption; his arrest occurred on 7 April 2018. His party tried to launch him as a candidate for president from prison in the election, but the proposal was rejected by the Congress. After expending 580 days in jail, Lula was released on 8 November 2019 following the Supreme Court decision that determined defendants can't be arrested until all their appeals have been exhausted.

Temer was the most unpopular president in Brazilian history and ranked among the most unpopular leaders in the world during his tenure. He didn't seek a second term and left office with a 7% approval rating.

== 2020s ==
=== Bolsonaro administration (2019–2022) ===
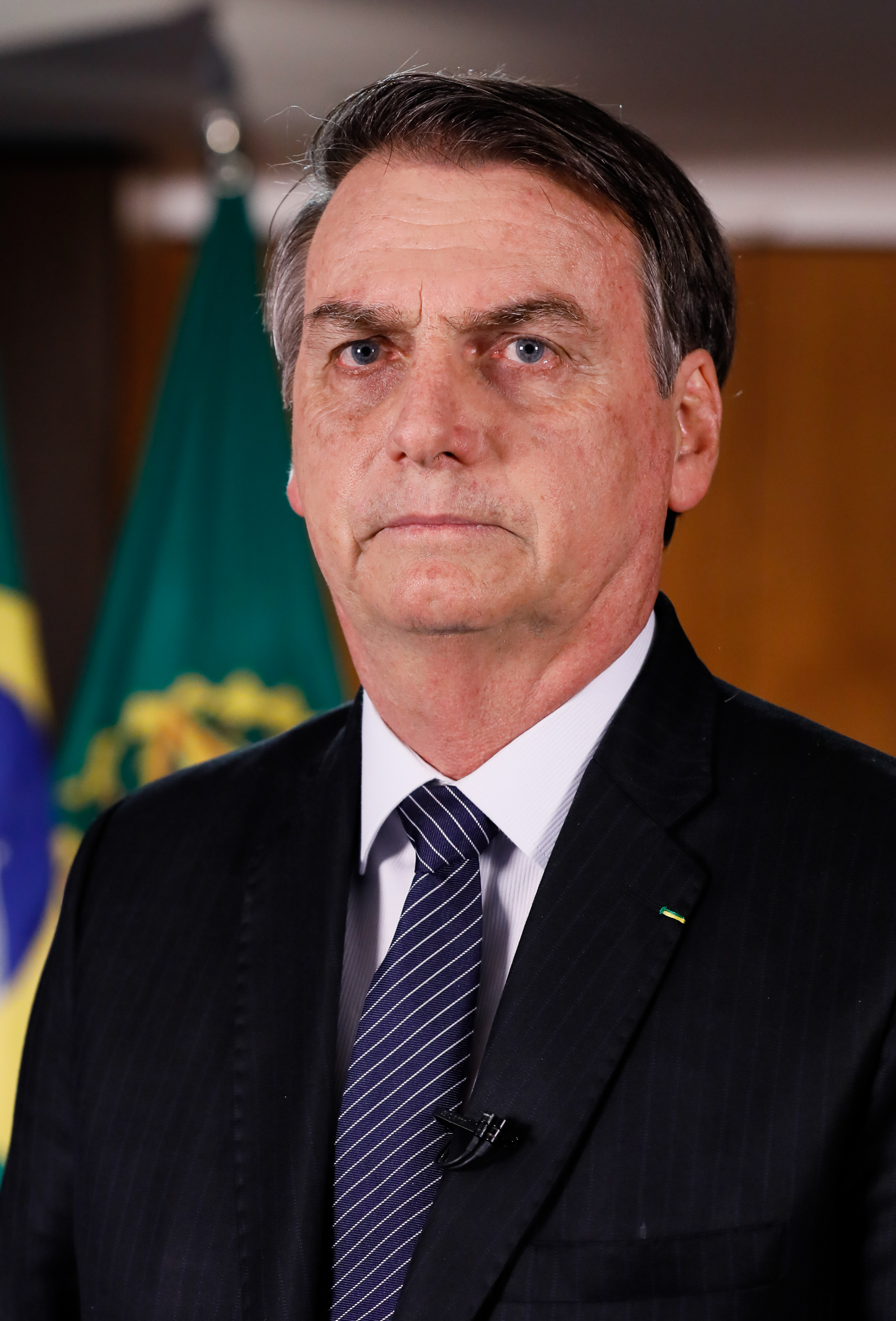
President Bolsonaro (2019–2022)

On 28 October 2018, right wing congressman and former army captain Jair Bolsonaro was elected President of Brazil, defeating Fernando Haddad and disrupting sixteen years of continuous left-wing rule by the Worker's Party (PT). With an unprecedented corruption scandal eroding the public's trust of institutions, Bolsonaro's position as a political outsider along with his hardline ideology against crime and corruption helped him win the presidential election, despite his past misogynist or racist remarks and his supportive view of the 21-year dictatorship. Bolsonaro took office as president on 1 January 2019.

During the first year of Bolsonaro's presidency, deforestation of the Amazon rainforest reached its highest level in 11 years in spite of the rainforest's important role in mitigating climate change. Bolsonaro's policies of increasing industry in the Amazon and the use of the slash-and-burn method for clearing forest areas eventually lead to a significant increase in Amazon rainforest wildfires in 2019 compared to previous years.

On 12 November 2019, his government approved the pension reform in Brazil, which will bring savings of over R$800 billion in 10 years.

In May 2020, the nation surpassed various earlier hotspots of the disease to become as of 21 May the third most affected country in the global COVID-19 pandemic. In July 2020, Brazil became the second worst COVID-19 affected country in the world.

Bolsonaro sought a second term in the 2022 Brazilian general election, obtaining 51 million votes in the first round. He was ultimately defeated in the second by former president Luiz Inácio Lula da Silva, becoming the first incumbent president in Brazilian history to lose re-election since its creation in 1997.

The last two years of Bolsonaro's presidency were marked by a constant conflict between the president himself and his allies against the Supreme Federal Court, especially Minister Alexandre de Moraes, who also presided over the Superior Electoral Court during the 2022 campaign. Following Lula's victory, influent members of the Bolsonaro administration engaged in a coup plot to stop Lula from taking office. Convicted on September 11 2005 — when the Supreme Court ruled Bolsonaro and 7 allies as guilty — Bolsonaro will face 27 years and three months in prison.

=== Second Lula administration (2023–) ===
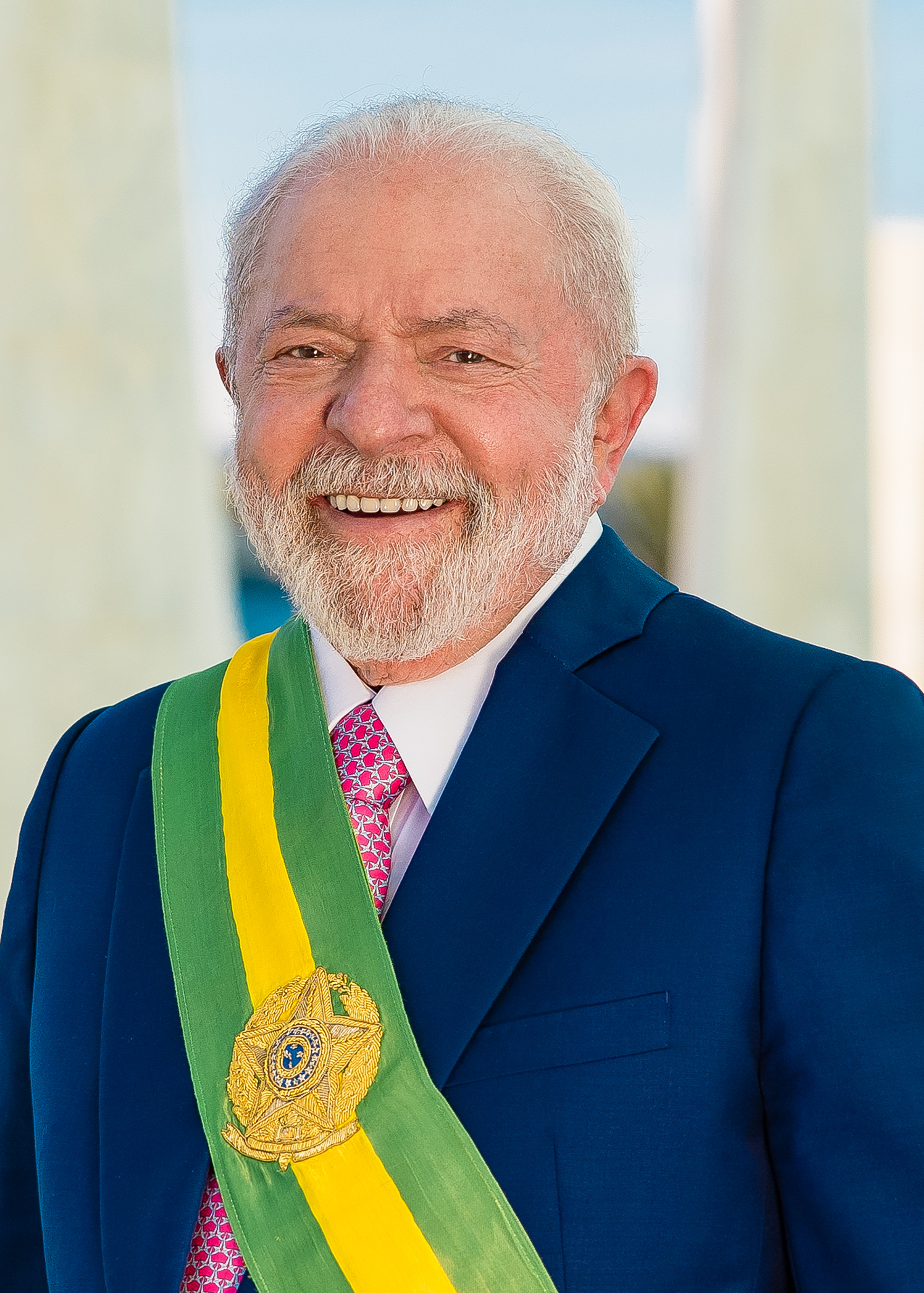
President Luiz Inácio Lula da Silva (2023–present)

On 30 October 2022, former president Luiz Inácio Lula da Silva was elected for an unprecedented third non-consecutive term, defeating incumbent president Jair Bolsonaro.

During the first days of presidency, the main buildings of the Three Powers Plaza in Brasília were stormed by Bolsonaro supporters, who refuse to accept his defeat, arguing the elections were fraudulent and claiming for a military intervention by the armed forces. The attack was widely compared to the United States Capitol attack of 6 January 2021.

In the first few months of his presidency, Lula abolished the Constitutional Amendment of the Public Expenditure Cap, created by the Temer administration in 2016. In March 2023, Minister of Finance Fernando Haddad introduced a new fiscal rule, which was approved by Congress in August that year. In December 2023, the Chamber of Deputies approved a tax reform proposal for the first time since the redemocratization. Several transnational newspapers, such as The Guardian and The New York Times, published articles pointing to growing Brazilian sovereignty and democracy.

== See also ==
- List of years in Brazil
- List of scandals in Brazil
