= List of ministers of foreign affairs of Brazil =

Minister of Foreign Affairs of Brazil
- Ministro das Relações Exteriores

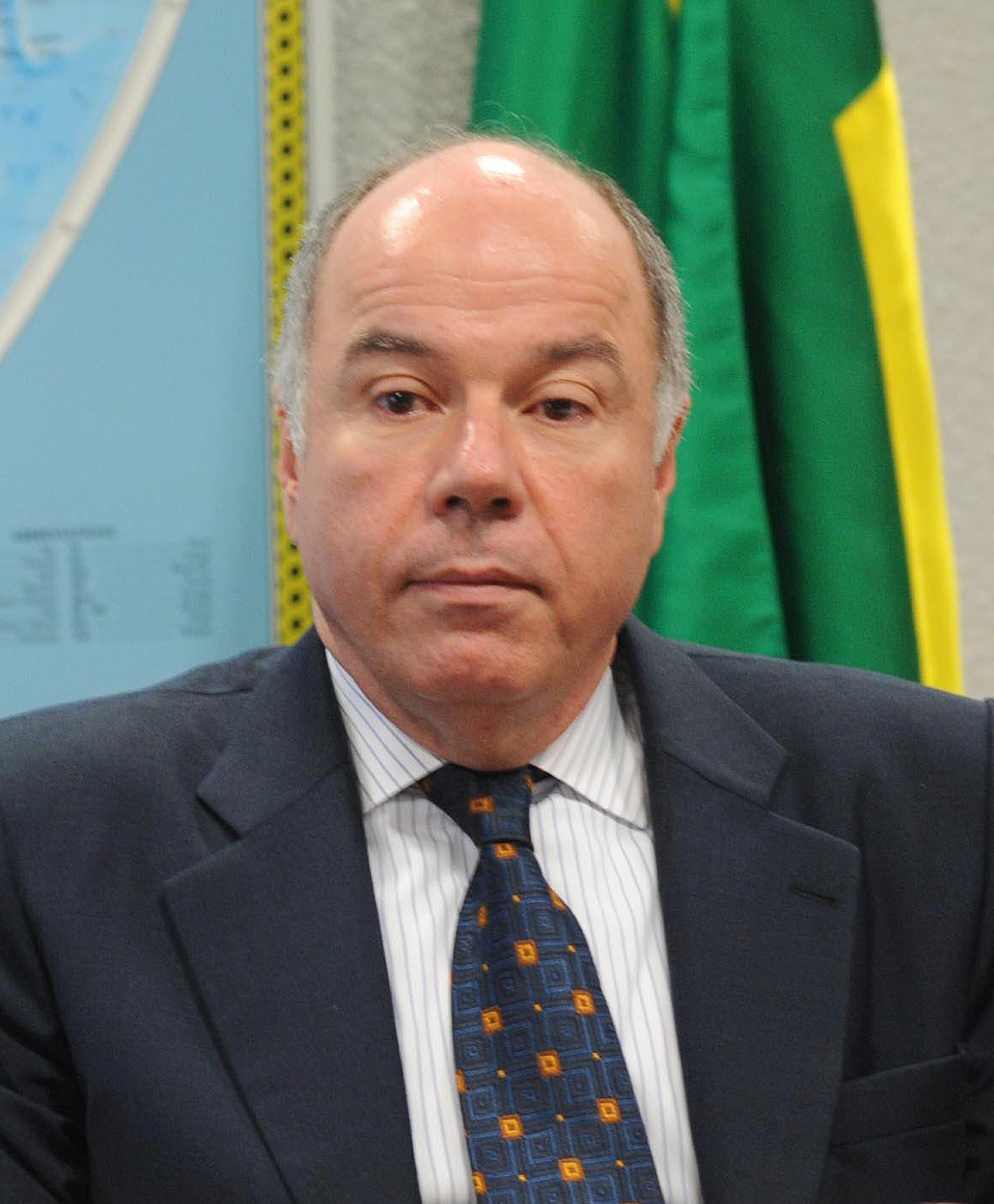
- Incumbent; Mauro Vieira since 1 January 2023
- Ministry of Foreign Affairs
- Style: Mr. Minister (informal); Chancellor (alternate informal); The Most Excellent Minister (formal); His Excellency (diplomatic)
- Type: Ministry
- Abbreviation: MRE
- Member of: Cabinet; National Defense Council
- Reports to: President of Brazil
- Seat: Itamaraty Palace, Brasília
- Appointer: President of Brazil
- Constituting instrument: Constitution of Brazil
- Formation: 16 January 1822; 204 years ago
- First holder: José Bonifácio de Andrada
- Salary: R$ 39,293.33 monthly
- Website: www.gov.br/mre/pt-br

This is a list of ministers of foreign affairs of Brazil.

== Empire of Brazil ==
=== Reign of Pedro I ===
No.	Portrait	Minister of Foreign Affairs	Took office	Left office	Time in office	Monarch
1	José Bonifácio	José Bonifácio (1763–1838)	16 January 1822	16 July 1823	1 year, 181 days	Pedro I
2	José Joaquim Carneiro de Campos, Marquis of Caravelas	José Joaquim Carneiro de Campos, Marquis of Caravelas (1768–1836)	16 July 1823	10 November 1823	117 days	Pedro I
3	Francisco Vilela Barbosa, Marquis of Paranaguá	Francisco Vilela Barbosa, Marquis of Paranaguá (1769–1846)	10 November 1823	14 November 1823	4 days	Pedro I
4	Luís José de Carvalho e Melo, Viscount of Cachoeira	Luís José de Carvalho e Melo, Viscount of Cachoeira (1764–1826)	14 November 1823	4 October 1825	1 year, 324 days	Pedro I
5	Francisco Vilela Barbosa, Marquis of Paranaguá	Francisco Vilela Barbosa, Marquis of Paranaguá (1769–1846)	10 April 1825	21 November 1825	225 days	Pedro I
6	José Egídio Álvares de Almeida, Marquis of Santo Amaro	José Egídio Álvares de Almeida, Marquis of Santo Amaro (1767–1832)	21 November 1825	20 January 1826	60 days	Pedro I
7	Antônio Luís Pereira da Cunha, Marquis of Inhambupe	Antônio Luís Pereira da Cunha, Marquis of Inhambupe (1760–1837)	20 January 1826	15 January 1827	360 days	Pedro I
8	João Severiano Maciel da Costa, Marquis of Queliz	João Severiano Maciel da Costa, Marquis of Queliz (1769–1833)	15 January 1827	20 November 1827	309 days	Pedro I
9	João Carlos Augusto de Oyenhausen-Gravenburg, Marquis of Aracati	João Carlos Augusto de Oyenhausen-Gravenburg, Marquis of Aracati (1776–1838)	20 November 1827	4 December 1829	2 years, 14 days	Pedro I
10	Miguel Calmon du Pin e Almeida, Marquis of Abrantes	Miguel Calmon du Pin e Almeida, Marquis of Abrantes (1796–1865)	4 December 1829	23 September 1830	293 days	Pedro I
11	Francisco Vilela Barbosa, Marquis of Paranaguá	Francisco Vilela Barbosa, Marquis of Paranaguá (1769–1846)	23 September 1830	9 December 1830	77 days	Pedro I
12	Francisco Carneiro de Campos	Francisco Carneiro de Campos (1765–1842)	9 December 1830	19 March 1831	100 days	Pedro I

=== Regency period ===
No.	Portrait	Minister of Foreign Affairs	Took office	Left office	Time in office	Regent
12	Francisco Carneiro de Campos	Francisco Carneiro de Campos (1765–1842)	19 March 1831	3 August 1832	1 year, 137 days	Provisional Triumviral Regency; Permanent Triumviral Regency
13	Pedro de Araújo Lima, Marquis of Olinda	Pedro de Araújo Lima, Marquis of Olinda (1793–1870)	3 August 1832	13 September 1832	41 days	Permanent Triumviral Regency
14	Bento da Silva Lisboa, Baron of Cairu	Bento da Silva Lisboa, Baron of Cairu (1793–1864)	13 September 1832	21 February 1834	1 year, 161 days	Permanent Triumviral Regency
15	Aureliano Coutinho, Viscount of Sepetiba	Aureliano Coutinho, Viscount of Sepetiba (1800–1855)	21 February 1834	16 January 1835	329 days	Permanent Triumviral Regency
16	Manuel Alves Branco, 2nd Viscount of Caravelas	Manuel Alves Branco, 2nd Viscount of Caravelas (1797–1855)	16 January 1835	5 February 1836	1 year, 20 days	Diogo Feijó
17	José Inácio Borges	José Inácio Borges (1770–1838)	5 February 1836	3 June 1836	119 days	Diogo Feijó
18	Antonio Paulino Limpo de Abreu, Viscount of Abaeté	Antonio Paulino Limpo de Abreu, Viscount of Abaeté (1798–1883)	3 June 1836	1 November 1836	151 days	Diogo Feijó
19	Gustavo Adolfo de Aguilar Pantoja	Gustavo Adolfo de Aguilar Pantoja (1798–1867)	1 November 1836	20 February 1837	111 days	Diogo Feijó
20	Antonio Paulino Limpo de Abreu, Viscount of Abaeté	Antonio Paulino Limpo de Abreu, Viscount of Abaeté (1798–1883)	20 February 1837	16 May 1837	85 days	Diogo Feijó
21	Francisco Jê Acaiaba de Montezuma, Viscount of Jequitinhonha	Francisco Jê Acaiaba de Montezuma, Viscount of Jequitinhonha (1794–1870)	16 May 1837	19 September 1837	126 days	Diogo Feijó
22	Antônio Peregrino Maciel Monteiro, 2nd Baron of Itamaracá	Antônio Peregrino Maciel Monteiro, 2nd Baron of Itamaracá (1804–1868)	19 September 1837	16 April 1839	1 year, 209 days	Pedro de Araújo Lima, Marquis of Olinda
23	Cândido Batista de Oliveira	Cândido Batista de Oliveira (1801–1865)	16 April 1839	1 September 1839	138 days	Pedro de Araújo Lima, Marquis of Olinda
24	Caetano Maraia Lopes Gama, Viscount of Maranguape	Caetano Maraia Lopes Gama, Viscount of Maranguape (1795–1864)	1 September 1839	24 July 1840	327 days	Pedro de Araújo Lima, Marquis of Olinda

=== Reign of Pedro II ===
No.	Portrait	Minister of Foreign Affairs	Took office	Left office	Time in office	Monarch
25	Aureliano Coutinho, Viscount of Sepetiba	Aureliano Coutinho, Viscount of Sepetiba (1800–1855)	24 July 1840	23 January 1843	2 years, 183 days	Pedro II
26	Honório Hermeto Carneiro Leão, Marquis of Paraná	Honório Hermeto Carneiro Leão, Marquis of Paraná (1801–1856)	23 January 1843	8 June 1843	136 days	Pedro II
27	Paulino Soares de Sousa, 1st Viscount of Uruguai	Paulino Soares de Sousa, 1st Viscount of Uruguai (1807–1866)	8 June 1843	2 February 1844	239 days	Pedro II
28	Ernesto Ferreira França	Ernesto Ferreira França (1804–1872)	2 February 1844	26 May 1845	1 year, 113 days	Pedro II
29	Antonio Paulino Limpo de Abreu, Viscount of Abaeté	Antonio Paulino Limpo de Abreu, Viscount of Abaeté (1798–1883)	26 May 1845	2 May 1846	341 days	Pedro II
30	Bento da Silva Lisboa, Baron of Cairu	Bento da Silva Lisboa, Baron of Cairu (1793–1864)	2 May 1846	22 May 1847	1 year, 20 days	Pedro II

No.	Portrait	Minister of Foreign Affairs	Took office	Left office	Time in office	Prime Minister
31	Saturnino de Sousa e Oliveira Coutinho	Saturnino de Sousa e Oliveira Coutinho (1803–1848)	22 May 1847	29 January 1848	252 days	Manuel Alves Branco, 2nd Viscount of Caravelas (Liberal)
32	José Antônio Pimenta Bueno, Marquis of São Vicente	José Antônio Pimenta Bueno, Marquis of São Vicente (1803–1878)	29 January 1848	8 March 1848	39 days	Manuel Alves Branco, 2nd Viscount of Caravelas (Liberal)
33	Antonio Paulino Limpo de Abreu, Viscount of Abaeté	Antonio Paulino Limpo de Abreu, Viscount of Abaeté (1798–1883)	8 March 1848	31 May 1848	84 days	José Carlos Pereira de Almeida Torres, Viscount of Macaé (Liberal)
34	Bernardo de Sousa Franco, Viscount of Sousa Franco	Bernardo de Sousa Franco, Viscount of Sousa Franco (1805–1875)	31 May 1848	29 September 1848	121 days	Francisco de Paula Sousa e Melo (Liberal)
35	Pedro de Araújo Lima, Marquis of Olinda	Pedro de Araújo Lima, Marquis of Olinda (1793–1870)	29 September 1848	8 October 1849	1 year, 9 days	Pedro de Araújo Lima, Marquis of Olinda (Conservative)
36	Paulino Soares de Sousa, 1st Viscount of Uruguai	Paulino Soares de Sousa, 1st Viscount of Uruguai (1807–1866)	8 October 1849	6 September 1853	3 years, 333 days	José da Costa Carvalho, Marquis of Monte Alegre (Conservative); Joaquim Rodrigues Torres, Viscount of Itaboraí (Conservative)
37	Antonio Paulino Limpo de Abreu, Viscount of Abaeté	Antonio Paulino Limpo de Abreu, Viscount of Abaeté (1798–1883)	6 September 1853	14 June 1855	1 year, 281 days	Honório Hermeto Carneiro Leão, Marquis of Paraná
38	José Paranhos, Viscount of Rio Branco	José Paranhos, Viscount of Rio Branco (1819–1880)	14 June 1855	4 May 1857	1 year, 324 days	Honório Hermeto Carneiro Leão, Marquis of Paraná (Conservative); Luís Alves de Lima e Silva, Duke of Caxias (Conservative)
39	Caetano Maraia Lopes Gama, Viscount of Maranguape	Caetano Maraia Lopes Gama, Viscount of Maranguape (1795–1864)	4 May 1857	12 December 1858	1 year, 222 days	Pedro de Araújo Lima, Marquis of Olinda (Conservative)
40	José Paranhos, Viscount of Rio Branco	José Paranhos, Viscount of Rio Branco (1819–1880)	12 December 1858	10 August 1859	241 days	Antonio Paulino Limpo de Abreu, Viscount of Abaeté (Conservative)
41	João Lins Cansanção, Viscount of Sinimbu	João Lins Cansanção, Viscount of Sinimbu (1810–1906)	10 August 1859	2 March 1861	1 year, 204 days	Ângelo Moniz da Silva Ferraz, Baron of Uruguaiana (Conservative)
42	José Paranhos, Viscount of Rio Branco	José Paranhos, Viscount of Rio Branco (1819–1880)	2 March 1861	21 April 1861	50 days	Luís Alves de Lima e Silva, Duke of Caxias (Conservative)
43	Antônio Coelho de Sá e Albuquerque	Antônio Coelho de Sá e Albuquerque (1821–1868)	21 April 1861	10 July 1861	80 days	Luís Alves de Lima e Silva, Duke of Caxias (Conservative)
44	Benevenuto Augusto Magalhães Taques	Benevenuto Augusto Magalhães Taques (1818–1881)	10 July 1861	24 May 1862	318 days	Luís Alves de Lima e Silva, Duke of Caxias (Conservative)
45	Carlos Carneiro de Campos, 3rd Viscount of Caravelas	Carlos Carneiro de Campos, 3rd Viscount of Caravelas (1805–1878)	24 May 1862	30 May 1862	6 days	Zacarias de Góis e Vasconcelos (Progressive League)
46	Miguel Calmon du Pin e Almeida, Marquis of Abrantes	Miguel Calmon du Pin e Almeida, Marquis of Abrantes (1796–1865)	30 May 1862	15 January 1864	1 year, 230 days	Pedro de Araújo Lima, Marquis of Olinda (Progressive League)
47	Francisco Xavier Paes Barreto	Francisco Xavier Paes Barreto (1821–1864)	15 January 1864	9 March 1864	54 days	Zacarias de Góis e Vasconcelos (Progressive League)
48	João pedro Dias Vieira	João pedro Dias Vieira (1820–1870)	9 March 1864	31 August 1864	175 days	Zacarias de Góis e Vasconcelos (Progressive League)
49	Carlos Carneiro de Campos, 3rd Viscount of Caravelas	Carlos Carneiro de Campos, 3rd Viscount of Caravelas (1805–1878)	31 August 1864	4 October 1864	34 days	Francisco José Furtado (Liberal)
50	João pedro Dias Vieira	João pedro Dias Vieira (1820–1870)	4 October 1864	12 May 1865	220 days	Francisco José Furtado (Liberal)
51	José Antônio Saraiva	José Antônio Saraiva (1823–1895)	12 May 1865	3 August 1866	1 year, 83 days	Pedro de Araújo Lima, Marquis of Olinda (Liberal)
52	Martim Francisco Ribeiro de Andrada	Martim Francisco Ribeiro de Andrada (1825–1886)	3 August 1866	27 October 1866	85 days	Zacarias de Góis e Vasconcelos (Liberal)
53	Antônio Coelho de Sá e Albuquerque	Antônio Coelho de Sá e Albuquerque (1821–1868)	27 October 1866	9 December 1867	1 year, 43 days	Zacarias de Góis e Vasconcelos (Liberal)
54	João Lustosa da Cunha Paranaguá, Marquis of Paranaguá	João Lustosa da Cunha Paranaguá, Marquis of Paranaguá (1821–1912)	9 December 1867	14 April 1868	127 days	Zacarias de Góis e Vasconcelos (Liberal)
55	João Silveira de Sousa	João Silveira de Sousa (1824–1906)	14 April 1868	16 July 1868	93 days	Zacarias de Góis e Vasconcelos (Liberal)
56	José Paranhos, Viscount of Rio Branco	José Paranhos, Viscount of Rio Branco (1819–1880)	16 July 1868	29 September 1870	2 years, 75 days	Joaquim Rodrigues Torres, Viscount of Itaboraí (Conservative)
57	José Antônio Pimenta Bueno, Marquis of São Vicente	José Antônio Pimenta Bueno, Marquis of São Vicente (1803–1878)	29 September 1870	7 March 1871	159 days	José Antônio Pimenta Bueno, Marquis of São Vicente (Conservative)
58	Manuel Francisco Correia	Manuel Francisco Correia (1831–1905)	7 March 1871	28 January 1873	1 year, 327 days	José Paranhos, Viscount of Rio Branco (Conservative)
59	Carlos Carneiro de Campos	Carlos Carneiro de Campos (1805–1878)	28 January 1873	25 June 1875	2 years, 148 days	José Paranhos, Viscount of Rio Branco (Conservative)
60	João Maurício Vanderlei, Baron of Cotegipe	João Maurício Vanderlei, Baron of Cotegipe (1815–1889)	25 July 1875	15 February 1877	1 year, 205 days	Luís Alves de Lima e Silva, Duke of Caxias (Conservative)
61	Diogo Velho Cavalcanti de Albuquerque, Viscount of Cavalcanti	Diogo Velho Cavalcanti de Albuquerque, Viscount of Cavalcanti (1829–1889)	15 February 1877	5 January 1878	324 days	Luís Alves de Lima e Silva, Duke of Caxias (Conservative)
62	Domingos de Sousa Leão, Baron of Vila Bela	Domingos de Sousa Leão, Baron of Vila Bela (1819–1879)	5 January 1878	8 February 1879	1 year, 34 days	João Lins Cansanção, Viscount of Sinimbu (Liberal)
63	João Lins Cansanção, Viscount of Sinimbu	João Lins Cansanção, Viscount of Sinimbu (1810–1906)	8 February 1879	4 June 1879	116 days	João Lins Cansanção, Viscount of Sinimbu (Liberal)
64	Antônio Moreira de Barros	Antônio Moreira de Barros (1841–1896)	4 June 1879	28 March 1880	298 days	João Lins Cansanção, Viscount of Sinimbu (Liberal)
65	Pedro Luís Pereira de Sousa	Pedro Luís Pereira de Sousa (1839–1884)	28 March 1880	3 November 1881	1 year, 220 days	José Antônio Saraiva (Liberal)
66	Franklin Dória, Baron of Loreto	Franklin Dória, Baron of Loreto (1836–1906)	3 November 1881	21 January 1882	79 days	José Antônio Saraiva (Liberal)
67	Filipe Franco	Filipe Franco (1841–1906)	21 January 1882	3 July 1882	163 days	Martinho Álvares da Silva Campos (Liberal)
68	Lourenço Cavalcanti de Albuquerque	Lourenço Cavalcanti de Albuquerque (1842–1918)	3 July 1882	24 May 1883	325 days	João Lustosa da Cunha Paranaguá, Marquis of Paranaguá (Liberal)
69	Francisco de Carvalho Soares Brandão	Francisco de Carvalho Soares Brandão (1839–1899)	24 May 1883	6 June 1884	1 year, 13 days	Lafayette Rodrigues Pereira (Liberal)
70	João da Mata Machado	João da Mata Machado (1850–1901)	6 June 1884	22 December 1884	199 days	Manuel Pinto de Sousa Dantas (Liberal)
71	Manuel Pinto de Sousa Dantas	Manuel Pinto de Sousa Dantas (1831–1894)	22 December 1884	6 May 1885	135 days	Manuel Pinto de Sousa Dantas (Liberal)
72	João Lustosa da Cunha Paranaguá, Marquis of Paranaguá	João Lustosa da Cunha Paranaguá, Marquis of Paranaguá (1821–1912)	6 May 1885	10 March 1888	2 years, 309 days	José Antônio Saraiva (Liberal)
73	João Maurício Vanderlei, Baron of Cotegipe	João Maurício Vanderlei, Baron of Cotegipe (1815–1889)	20 August 1885	10 March 1888	2 years, 203 days	João Maurício Vanderlei, Baron of Cotegipe (Conservative)
74	Antônio da Silva Prado	Antônio da Silva Prado (1840–1929)	10 March 1888	27 June 1888	109 days	João Alfredo Correia de Oliveira (Conservative)
75	Rodrigo Augusto da Silva	Rodrigo Augusto da Silva (1833–1889)	27 June 1888	7 June 1889	345 days	João Alfredo Correia de Oliveira (Conservative)
76	José Francisco Diana	José Francisco Diana (1841–1916)	7 June 1889	15 November 1889	161 days	Afonso Celso, Viscount of Ouro Preto (Liberal)

== Republican period ==
=== First Brazilian Republic ===
No.	Portrait	Minister of Foreign Affairs	Took office	Left office	Time in office	Party	President
77	Quintino Bocaiuva	Quintino Bocaiuva (1836–1912)	15 November 1889	23 January 1891	1 year, 69 days	PRC	Deodoro da Fonseca (Ind)
78	Justo Chermont	Justo Chermont (1857–1926)	26 February 1891	23 November 1891	270 days	PRF	Deodoro da Fonseca (Ind)
79	Fernando Lobo Leite Pereira	Fernando Lobo Leite Pereira (1851–1918)	30 November 1891	12 February 1892	74 days	PR Federal	Floriano Peixoto (Ind)
80	Serzedelo Correia	Serzedelo Correia (1858–1932)	12 February 1892	22 June 1892	131 days	Independent	Floriano Peixoto (Ind)
–	Custódio José de Melo	Custódio José de Melo (1840–1902); Acting	22 June 1892	11 December 1892	172 days	Independent	Floriano Peixoto (Ind)
81	Antônio Francisco de Paula Sousa	Antônio Francisco de Paula Sousa (1843–1917)	11 December 1892	22 April 1893	132 days	Republican Party of São Paulo	Floriano Peixoto (Ind)
82	Felisbelo Firmo de Oliveira Freire	Felisbelo Firmo de Oliveira Freire (1858–1916)	22 April 1893	30 June 1893	69 days	Independent	Floriano Peixoto (Ind)
83	João Filipe Pereira	João Filipe Pereira (1861–1950)	30 June 1893	7 October 1893	99 days	PRF	Floriano Peixoto (Ind)
84	Alexandre Cassiano do Nascimento	Alexandre Cassiano do Nascimento (1856–1912)	27 October 1893	15 November 1894	1 year, 19 days	PRR	Floriano Peixoto (Ind)
85	Carlos Augusto de Carvalho	Carlos Augusto de Carvalho (1851–1905)	15 November 1894	1 September 1896	1 year, 291 days	Independent	Prudente de Morais (PR Federal)
86	Dionísio Cerqueira	Dionísio Cerqueira (1847–1910)	1 September 1896	15 November 1898	2 years, 75 days	Independent	Prudente de Morais (PR Federal)
87	Olinto de Magalhães	Olinto de Magalhães (1866–1948)	15 November 1898	15 November 1902	4 years, 0 days	Independent	Campos Sales (Republican Party of São Paulo)
–	J. J. Seabra	J. J. Seabra (1855–1942); Acting	15 November 1902	3 December 1902	18 days	Independent	Rodrigues Alves (Republican Party of São Paulo)
88	José Paranhos, Baron of Rio Branco	José Paranhos, Baron of Rio Branco (1845–1912)	3 December 1902	10 February 1912	9 years, 69 days	Independent	Rodrigues Alves (Republican Party of São Paulo); Afonso Pena (Minas Republican Party); Nilo Peçanha (PRF); Hermes da Fonseca (PRC)
–	Eneias Martins	Eneias Martins (1872–1919); Acting	10 February 1912	14 February 1912	4 days	Independent	Hermes da Fonseca (PRC)
89	Lauro Müller	Lauro Müller (1863–1926)	14 February 1912	7 May 1917	5 years, 82 days	PRC	Hermes da Fonseca (PRC); Venceslau Brás
90	Nilo Peçanha	Nilo Peçanha (1867–1924)	7 May 1917	15 November 1918	1 year, 192 days	PRF	Venceslau Brás (Minas Republican Party)
91	Domício da Gama	Domício da Gama (1862–1925)	15 November 1918	28 July 1919	255 days	Independent	Delfim Moreira (Minas Republican Party)
–	Augusto Cochrane de Alencar	Augusto Cochrane de Alencar (1865–1927)	28 July 1919	29 July 1919	1 day	Independent	Epitácio Pessoa (Minas Republican Party)
92	José Manuel de Azevedo Marques	José Manuel de Azevedo Marques (1865–1943)	29 July 1919	15 November 1922	3 years, 109 days	Independent	Epitácio Pessoa (Minas Republican Party)
93	Félix Pacheco	Félix Pacheco (1879–1935)	15 November 1922	15 November 1926	4 years, 0 days	Independent	Artur Bernardes (Minas Republican Party)
94	Otávio Mangabeira	Otávio Mangabeira (1886–1960)	15 November 1926	24 October 1930	3 years, 343 days	PRB	Washington Luís (Republican Party of São Paulo)

=== Second Brazilian Republic ===
No.	Portrait	Minister of Foreign Affairs	Took office	Left office	Time in office	President
95	Afrânio de Melo Franco	Afrânio de Melo Franco (1870–1943)	24 October 1930	28 December 1933	3 years, 65 days	Military Junta of 1930; Getúlio Vargas
96	Félix de Barros Cavalcanti de Lacerda	Félix de Barros Cavalcanti de Lacerda (1880–1950)	28 December 1933	26 July 1934	210 days	Getúlio Vargas
97	José Carlos de Macedo Soares	José Carlos de Macedo Soares (1883–1968)	26 July 1934	1 November 1936	2 years, 98 days	Getúlio Vargas
98	Mário de Pimentel Brandão	Mário de Pimentel Brandão (1889–1956)	1 November 1936	15 March 1938	1 year, 134 days	Getúlio Vargas
99	Osvaldo Aranha	Osvaldo Aranha (1894–1960)	15 March 1938	23 August 1944	6 years, 161 days	Getúlio Vargas
–	Pedro Leão Veloso	Pedro Leão Veloso (1887–1947); Acting	24 August 1944	20 February 1945	180 days	Getúlio Vargas
–	José Carlos de Macedo Soares	José Carlos de Macedo Soares (1883–1968); Acting	20 February 1945	19 March 1945	27 days	Getúlio Vargas
–	Pedro Leão Veloso	Pedro Leão Veloso (1887–1947); Acting	19 March 1945	15 April 1945	27 days	Getúlio Vargas
–	José Carlos de Macedo Soares	José Carlos de Macedo Soares (1883–1968); Acting	15 April 1945	6 July 1945	82 days	Getúlio Vargas
–	Pedro Leão Veloso	Pedro Leão Veloso (1887–1947); Acting	6 July 1945	30 October 1945	116 days	Getúlio Vargas
100	Pedro Leão Veloso	Pedro Leão Veloso (1887–1947)	31 October 1945	30 January 1946	91 days	José Linhares

=== Fourth Brazilian Republic ===
No.	Portrait	Minister of Foreign Affairs	Took office	Left office	Time in office	Party	President
101	João Neves da Fontoura	João Neves da Fontoura (1887–1963)	31 January 1946	24 July 1946	174 days	Independent	Eurico Gaspar Dutra (PSD)
–	Samuel de Sousa Leão Gracie	Samuel de Sousa Leão Gracie (1891–1967); Acting	25 July 1946	12 December 1946	140 days	Independent	Eurico Gaspar Dutra (PSD)
102	Raul Fernandes	Raul Fernandes (1877–1968)	12 December 1946	31 January 1951	4 years, 50 days	Independent	Eurico Gaspar Dutra (PSD)
103	Samuel de Sousa Leão Gracie	Samuel de Sousa Leão Gracie (1891–1967)	31 January 1951	19 June 1953	2 years, 139 days	Independent	Getúlio Vargas (PTB)
–	Mário de Pimentel Brandão	Mário de Pimentel Brandão (1889–1956); Acting	19 June 1953	2 July 1953	13 days	Independent	Getúlio Vargas (PTB)
104	Vicente Rao	Vicente Rao (1892–1978)	3 July 1953	24 August 1954	1 year, 52 days	Independent	Getúlio Vargas (PTB)
105	Raul Fernandes	Raul Fernandes (1877–1968)	26 August 1954	11 November 1955	1 year, 77 days	Independent	Café Filho (PSP)
106	José Carlos de Macedo Soares	José Carlos de Macedo Soares (1883–1968)	12 November 1955	4 July 1958	2 years, 234 days	Independent	Nereu Ramos (PSD); Juscelino Kubitschek (PSD)
107	Negrão de Lima	Negrão de Lima (1901–1981)	4 July 1958	30 August 1959	1 year, 57 days	PSD	Juscelino Kubitschek (PSD)
108	Horácio Lafer	Horácio Lafer (1900–1965)	30 August 1959	31 January 1961	1 year, 154 days	PSD	Juscelino Kubitschek (PSD)
109	Afonso Arinos de Melo Franco	Afonso Arinos de Melo Franco (1905–1990)	31 January 1961	25 August 1961	206 days	UDN	Jânio Quadros (PTN)
–	Vacant	Vacant	25 August 1961	7 September 1961	13 days	Vacant	Ranieri Mazzilli (PSD)

No.	Portrait	Minister of Foreign Affairs	Took office	Left office	Time in office	Party	Prime Minister
110	San Tiago Dantas	San Tiago Dantas (1911–1964)	8 September 1961	12 July 1962	307 days	PTB	Tancredo Neves (PSD)
111	Afonso Arinos de Melo Franco	Afonso Arinos de Melo Franco (1905–1990)	12 July 1962	18 September 1962	68 days	UDN	Francisco Brochado da Rocha (PSD)
112	Hermes Lima	Hermes Lima (1902–1978)	18 September 1962	24 January 1963	128 days	PTB	Hermes Lima (PTB)

No.	Portrait	Minister of Foreign Affairs	Took office	Left office	Time in office	Party	President
112	Hermes Lima	Hermes Lima (1902–1978)	24 January 1963	18 June 1963	145 days	PTB	João Goulart (PTB)
113	Evandro Lins e Silva	Evandro Lins e Silva (1912–2002)	18 June 1963	22 August 1963	65 days	Independent	João Goulart (PTB)
114	João Augusto de Araújo Castro	João Augusto de Araújo Castro (1919–1975)	22 August 1963	31 March 1964	222 days	Independent	João Goulart (PTB)

=== Military Dictatorship (Fifth Brazilian Republic) ===
No.	Portrait	Minister of Foreign Affairs	Took office	Left office	Time in office	Party	President
115	Vasco Leitão da Cunha	Vasco Leitão da Cunha (1903–1984)	4 April 1964	17 January 1966	1 year, 288 days	Independent	Ranieri Mazzilli (PSD); Castelo Branco (ARENA)
116	Juracy Magalhães	Juracy Magalhães (1905–2001)	17 January 1966	15 March 1967	1 year, 57 days	ARENA	Castelo Branco (ARENA)
117	Magalhães Pinto	Magalhães Pinto (1909–1996)	15 March 1967	30 October 1969	2 years, 229 days	ARENA	Costa e Silva (ARENA); Military Junta of 1969 (Military dictatorship in Brazil)
118	Mário Gibson Barbosa	Mário Gibson Barbosa (1918–2007)	31 October 1969	15 March 1974	4 years, 135 days	Independent	Emílio Garrastazu Médici (ARENA)
119	Azeredo da Silveira	Azeredo da Silveira (1917–1990)	15 March 1974	15 March 1979	5 years, 0 days	Independent	Ernesto Geisel (ARENA)
120	Ramiro Saraiva Guerreiro	Ramiro Saraiva Guerreiro (1918–2011)	15 March 1979	15 March 1985	47 years, 227 days	Independent	João Figueiredo (PDS)

=== Sixth Brazilian Republic ===
No.	Portrait	Minister of Foreign Affairs	Took office	Left office	Time in office	Party	President
121	Olavo Setúbal	Olavo Setúbal (1923–2008)	15 March 1985	14 February 1986	336 days	MDB	José Sarney (MDB)
122	Abreu Sodré	Abreu Sodré (1917–1999)	14 February 1986	15 March 1990	4 years, 29 days	PFL	José Sarney (MDB)
123	Francisco Rezek	Francisco Rezek (born 1944)	15 March 1990	13 April 1992	2 years, 29 days	Independent	Fernando Collor (PRN)
124	Celso Lafer	Celso Lafer (born 1941)	13 April 1992	2 October 1992	172 days	Independent	Fernando Collor (PRN)
125	Fernando Henrique Cardoso	Fernando Henrique Cardoso (born 1931)	5 October 1992	20 May 1993	227 days	PSDB	Itamar Franco (MDB)
–	Luiz Felipe Lampreia	Luiz Felipe Lampreia (1941–2016); Acting	20 May 1993	20 July 1993	61 days	Independent	Itamar Franco (MDB)
126	Celso Amorim	Celso Amorim (born 1942)	20 July 1993	1 January 1995	1 year, 165 days	MDB	Itamar Franco (MDB)
127	Luiz Felipe Lampreia	Luiz Felipe Lampreia (1941–2016)	1 January 1995	12 January 2001	6 years, 11 days	Independent	Fernando Henrique Cardoso (PSDB)
–	Luiz Felipe de Seixas Corrêa	Luiz Felipe de Seixas Corrêa (born 1945); Acting	12 January 2001	29 January 2001	17 days	Independent	Fernando Henrique Cardoso (PSDB)
128	Celso Lafer	Celso Lafer (born 1941)	29 January 2001	1 January 2003	2 years, 0 days	Independent	Fernando Henrique Cardoso (PSDB)
129	Celso Amorim	Celso Amorim (born 1942)	1 January 2003	1 January 2011	8 years, 0 days	PT	Luiz Inácio Lula da Silva (PT)
130	Antonio Patriota	Antonio Patriota (born 1954)	1 January 2011	26 August 2013	2 years, 237 days	Independent	Dilma Rousseff (PT)
–	Eduardo dos Santos	Eduardo dos Santos (born 1952); Acting	26 August 2013	28 August 2013	2 days	Independent	Dilma Rousseff (PT)
131	Luiz Alberto Figueiredo	Luiz Alberto Figueiredo (born 1955)	28 August 2013	1 January 2015	1 year, 126 days	Independent	Dilma Rousseff (PT)
132	Mauro Vieira	Mauro Vieira (born 1951)	1 January 2015	12 May 2016	1 year, 132 days	Independent	Dilma Rousseff (PT)
133	José Serra	José Serra (born 1942)	12 May 2016	22 February 2017	286 days	PSDB	Michel Temer (MDB)
–	Marcos Galvão	Marcos Galvão (born 1959); Acting	22 February 2017	7 March 2017	13 days	Independent	Michel Temer (MDB)
134	Aloysio Nunes	Aloysio Nunes (born 1945)	7 March 2017	1 January 2019	1 year, 300 days	PSDB	Michel Temer (MDB)
135	Ernesto Araújo	Ernesto Araújo (born 1967)	1 January 2019	29 March 2021	2 years, 87 days	Independent	Jair Bolsonaro (PSL)
136	Carlos França	Carlos França (born 1964)	6 April 2021	1 January 2023	5 years, 205 days	Independent	Jair Bolsonaro (PL)
137	Mauro Vieira	Mauro Vieira (born 1951)	1 January 2023	Incumbent	3 years, 300 days	Independent	Luiz Inácio Lula da Silva (PT)

== See also ==
- List of ministers of justice of Brazil
- List of ministers of health of Brazil
