= List of dignitaries at the state funeral of John F. Kennedy =

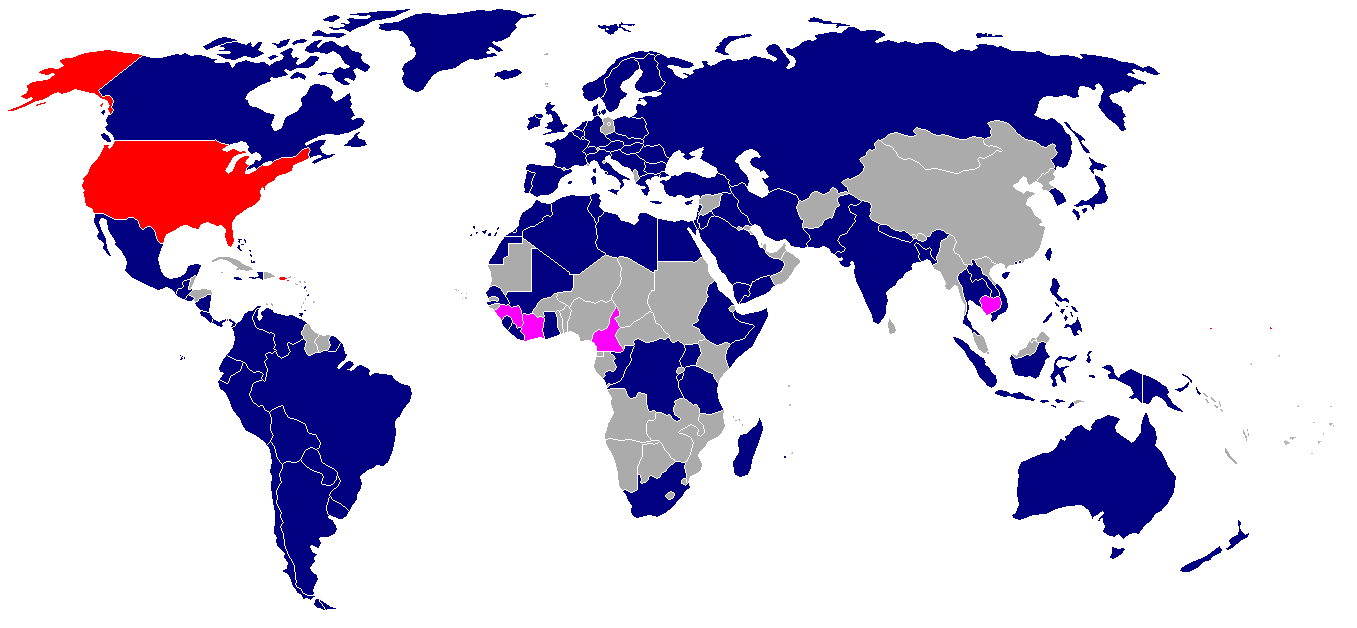
Nations that attended the funeral (blue) or whose dignitaries arrived too late, but attended Lyndon B. Johnson's reception on November 25 (pink).

This is a list of dignitaries at the state funeral of John F. Kennedy. Kennedy was assassinated on November 22, 1963, in Dallas, Texas, and his state funeral took place on November 25, 1963, in Washington, D.C.

As President Kennedy lay in state, foreign dignitaries—including heads of state and government and members of royal families—started to arrive in Washington to attend the state funeral on Monday. Secretary of State Dean Rusk and other State Department personnel went to both of Washington's commercial airports to personally greet foreign dignitaries.

With so many foreign dignitaires attending the funeral, some law enforcement officials, including MPDC Chief Robert V. Murray, later said that it was the biggest security nightmare they ever faced.

Not since the funeral of Britain's King Edward VII, in 1910, had there been such a large gathering of presidents, prime ministers, and royalty at a state funeral. In all, 220 foreign dignitaries from 92 countries, five international agencies, and the papacy attended the funeral. The dignitaries including 19 heads of state and government and members of royal families. This was the largest gathering of foreign statesmen in the history of the United States.

== Foreign delegations ==
=== A ===
Country	Person	Title
Afghanistan	Assadullah Seraj	Ambassador to France
Algeria	Abdelkadir Chanderil; Abdelaziz Bouteflika; El Hadj Benalla; Amar Ouzegane; Cherif Guellal	Ambassador to the United Nations; President of the National Assembly; Foreign Minister; Minister of State; Ambassador to the United States
Argentina	Carlos Humberto Perette; Miguel Ángel Zavala Ortiz; Ignacio Ávalos	Vice President; Minister of Foreign Relations; Secretary of War
Australia	Alister McMullin	President of the Senate
Austria	Alfons Gorbach	Chancellor

=== B ===
Country	Person	Title
Bahamas	Roland Theodore Symonette	Premier-designate
Belgium	Baudouin; Paul-Henri Spaak	King; Minister of Foreign Affairs
Bolivia	Enrique Sánchez de Lozada	Ambassador to the United States
Brazil	João Augusto de Araújo Castro; Auro de Moura Andrade; Vitorino Freire; Antônio Carlos Konder Reis; Roberto de Oliveira Campos	Foreign Minister; President of the Senate; Majority Leader of the Senate; Minority Leader of the Senate; Ambassador to the United States
Bulgaria	Milko Tarabanov	Deputy Foreign Minister
Burundi	Léon Ndenzako	Ambassador to the United States

=== C ===
Country	Person	Title
Cambodia	Prince Norodom Kantol	Prime Minister
Cameroon	Benoît Balla-Ondoux	Foreign Minister
Canada	Lester B. Pearson; Paul Martin Sr.	Prime Minister; Secretary of State for External Affairs
Chile	Carlos Martínez Sotomayor	Representative to the United Nations
China	Tsiang Tingfu	Ambassador to the United States
Colombia	Alberto Lleras Camargo	Former President
Congo-Brazzaville	Emmanuel Damongo-Dadet	Ambassador to the United States
Congo-Léopoldville	Jacques Masangu	Deputy Premier
Costa Rica	José Figueres Ferrer	Former President
Cyprus	Zenon Rossides	Ambassador to the United States
Czechoslovakia	Jiří Hájek	Representative to the United Nations

=== D ===
Country	Person	Title
Denmark	Jens Otto Krag	Prime Minister

=== E ===
Country	Person	Title
Ecuador	Neftali Ponce Miranda	Foreign Minister
El Salvador	Héctor Escobar Serrano	Foreign Minister
Ethiopia	Haile Selassie I Ras Andargachew Messai; Eskinder Desta; Teferawork Kidane-Wold; Lij Kassa Woldemariam	Emperor; Governor of Sidamo; Commander of the Ethiopian Navy; Minister of the Pen; President of Haile Selassie I University

=== F ===
Country	Person	Title
Finland	Veli Merikoski	Minister for Foreign Affairs
France	Charles de Gaulle; Maurice Couve de Murville; Charles Ailleret; Étienne Burin des Roziers	President; Minister of Foreign Affairs; Chief of the Defence Staff; Secretary General of the President

=== G ===
Country	Person	Title
West Germany	Heinrich Lübke; Ludwig Erhard; Gerhard Schröder; Kai-Uwe von Hassel; Willy Brandt	President; Chancellor; Minister of Foreign Affairs; Minister of Defence; Mayor of West Berlin
Ghana	Miguel A. Ribeiro; Kwesi Armah; Alex Quaison-Sackey	Ambassador to the United States; High Commissioner in London; Representative to the United Nations
Greece	Frederica; Sofoklis Venizelos	Queen consort (representing the King); Deputy Premier and Foreign Minister
Guatemala	Alberto Herrarte González; José de Dios Agular	Foreign Minister; Private Secretary to the Government
Guinea	Saifonlaye Diallo; Leon Maka; Alessane Dioh	Minister of State; President of the National Assembly; Minister of Communications

=== H ===
Country	Person	Title
Haiti	Carlet Auguste	Ambassador to the United Nations
Holy See	Rev. Egidio Vagnozzi	Apostolic Delegate
Hungary	Péter Mód	First Deputy Foreign Minister

=== I ===
Country	Person	Title
Iceland	Guðmundur Ívarsson Guðmundsson	Foreign Minister
India	Vijaya Lakshmi Pandit	Delegate to the United Nations
Indonesia	Abdul Haris Nasution; Sudjarwo Tjondronegoro	Minister for Defense and Security Affairs; Deputy Foreign Minister
Iran	Gholam Reza Pahlavi; Abbas Aram	Prince (representing the Shah); Foreign Minister
Iraq	Ali Haidar Sulaiman	Ambassador to the United States
Ireland	Éamon de Valera; Frank Aiken; Vivion de Valera	President; Minister of External Affairs; Son of Éamon de Valera
Israel	Zalman Shazar; Golda Meir	President; Foreign Minister
Italy	Cesare Merzagora; Attilio Piccioni; Piero Vinci; Guerino Roberti; Emiliano Scotti	President of the Senate; Foreign Minister; Foreign Ministry chef du cabinet Assistant Chief of Protocol; Military Counselor to the President
Ivory Coast	Philippe Yacé; Camille Alliali	President of the National Assembly; Minister Delegate for Foreign Affairs

=== J ===
Country	Person	Title
Jamaica	Alexander Bustamante; Paul Cook; James Lloyd; Noel Crosswell	Prime Minister; Chief of Staff; Secretary of the Ministry of External Affairs; Chief of Police
Japan	Hayato Ikeda; Masayoshi Ōhira	Prime Minister; Foreign Minister
Jordan	Antone Atallah	Foreign Minister

=== K ===
Country	Person	Title
South Korea	Park Chung-hee	Acting President

=== L ===
Country	Person	Title
Laos	Tiao Khampan; Sisouk na Champassak	Permanent Representative to the United Nations; Ambassador to India
Lebanon	Ibrahim Ahdab; George Hakim	Ambassador to the United States; Representative to the United Nations
Liberia	William R. Tolbert, Jr. J. Rudolph Grimes	Vice-President; Secretary of State
Libya	Wahbi al-Bouri	Representative to the United Nations
Luxembourg	Jean; Eugène Schaus	Hereditary Grand Duke (representing the Grand Duchess); Foreign Minister

=== M ===
Country	Person	Title
Madagascar	Louis Rakotomalala	Permanent Representative to the United Nations
Mali	R. E. Oumar Sow	Representative to the United Nations
Mexico	Manuel Tello Baurraud	Secretary of Foreign Affairs
Morocco	Moulay Abdallah; Ahmed Reda Guedira; Mohammad Ziani; Abdelkader Benjelloun; Ali Benjelloun; Ahmed Taibi Benhima; Badir din Senoussi; Mohamed Meziane; Moulay Hafid	Prince (representing the King); Foreign Minister; Attaché to the Cabinet of the Foreign Minister; Minister of Justice; Ambassador; Permanent Representative to the United Nations; Attaché to the Royal Cabinet; Inspector General of the Armed Forces; Director General of Royal Protocol

=== N ===
Country	Person	Title
Nepal	Matrika Prasad Koirala	Ambassador to the United States
Netherlands	Bernhard; Beatrix; Joseph Luns	Prince (representing the Queen); Crown Princess; Minister of Foreign Affairs
New Zealand	R. E. George Laking	Ambassador to the United States
Nicaragua	Luis Somoza Debayle; Alfonso Ortega Urbina	Senator and Former President; Foreign Minister
Norway	Harald; Einar Gerhardsen	Crown Prince (representing the King); Prime Minister

=== P ===
Country	Person	Title
Pakistan	Zulfikar Ali Bhutto	Minister of Foreign Affairs
Panama	Galileo Solís; Arturo Morgan Morales	Minister of Foreign Affairs
Paraguay	Juan Plate	Ambassador to the United Nations
Peru	Víctor Andrés Belaúnde	Permanent Representative to the United Nations
Philippines	Diosdado Macapagal; Eva Macapagal	President; First Lady
Poland	Stanisław Kulczyński; Piotr Jaroszewicz	Deputy Chairman of the Council of State; Deputy Prime Minister
Portugal	Luís Supico Pinto	President of the Corporative Chamber

=== R ===
Country	Person	Title
Romania	Mircea Malița	Deputy Minister of Foreign Affairs

=== S ===
Country	Person	Title
Saudi Arabia	Rashad Pharaon; Abdallah Hababi	Ambassador to France; Chargé d'affaires in Washington
Sierra Leone	John Karefa-Smart	Minister of External Affairs
Somalia	Mohammed Ali Daar	Undersecretary of Foreign Affairs
South Africa	Dr. Willem C. Naude	Ambassador to the United Nations
Soviet Union	Anastas Mikoyan	First Deputy Chairman of the Council of Ministers
Spain	Agustín Muñoz Grandes	First Vice President of the Government
Sweden	Prince Bertil, Duke of Halland; Tage Erlander; Olof Palme	Prince of Sweden (representing the King); Prime Minister; Minister Without Portfolio
Switzerland	Friedrich Traugott Wahlen; Pierre Michell	Chief of the Political Department; Secretary General of the Political Department

=== T ===
Country	Person	Title
Tanganyika	Chief Erasto A.M. Mangyenya	Permanent Representative to the United Nations
Thailand	Thanat Khoman	Foreign Minister
Trinidad and Tobago	Sir Ellis E.I. Clarke	Ambassador to the United States
Tunisia	Bahi Ladgham; Mongi Slim; Taieb Slim; Habib Bourguiba, Jr. Hachemi Quanes	Prime Minister; Minister of Foreign Affairs; Permanent Representative to the United States; Ambassador
Turkey	İsmet İnönü; Feridun Cemal Erkin	Prime Minister; Minister of Foreign Affairs

=== U ===
Country	Person	Title
Uganda	Apollo Kironde	Ambassador
United Arab Republic	Mahmoud Fawzi	Minister of Foreign Affairs
United Kingdom	Prince Philip, Duke of Edinburgh; Alec Douglas-Home; Elizabeth Douglas-Home; Harold Wilson; Jo Grimond	Consort to the British Monarch (representing the Queen); Prime Minister; Spouse of the Prime Minister; Leader of the Opposition; Leader of the Liberal Party
Uruguay	Juan Felipe Yriart	Ambassador

=== V ===
Country	Person	Title
Venezuela	Rolando Leandro Mora; Antonio Briceño Linares	Acting Minister of Foreign Affairs; Minister of Defence
South Vietnam	Tran Chanh Thanh	Ambassador-designate

=== Y ===
Country	Person	Title
Yugoslavia	Koča Popović; Petar Stambolić	Foreign Minister; Prime Minister

=== International organizations ===
Organization	Person	Title
European Atomic Energy Community	(Netherlands) Maan Sassen	Member of the Council
European Coal and Steel Community	(Belgium) Albert Coppé (France) Jean Monnet	Vice President; Former President
European Economic Community	(Belgium) Jean Rey	President

Organization	Person	Title
United Nations	(Myanmar) U Thant (United States) Ralph Bunche (United States) Paul G. Hoffman (United States) Maurice Pate; David Vaughan (Venezuela) Carlos Sosa Rodríguez and wife (United Kingdom) Sir Patrick Dean; Dr. Louis Alvarado; David Blanchard	Secretary-General of the United Nations; Under-Secretary-General for Political Affairs; Managing Director of the United Nations Special Fund; Executive Director of UNICEF; Director of General Services; President of the General Assembly and wife President of the United Nations Security Council; International Labour Organization; International Labour Organization

== Prominent absences ==
Various world leaders and statesmen did not attend the slain president's funeral. Those not present attended memorial services in their respective countries. Some of the key notable absences included:

- Australian Prime Minister Robert Menzies, citing the ongoing election campaign
- Italian President Antonio Segni, who could not make the trip because of a flu
- Indian Prime Minister Jawaharlal Nehru, on account of the helicopter crash on the same day as the assassination
