= Military Question =

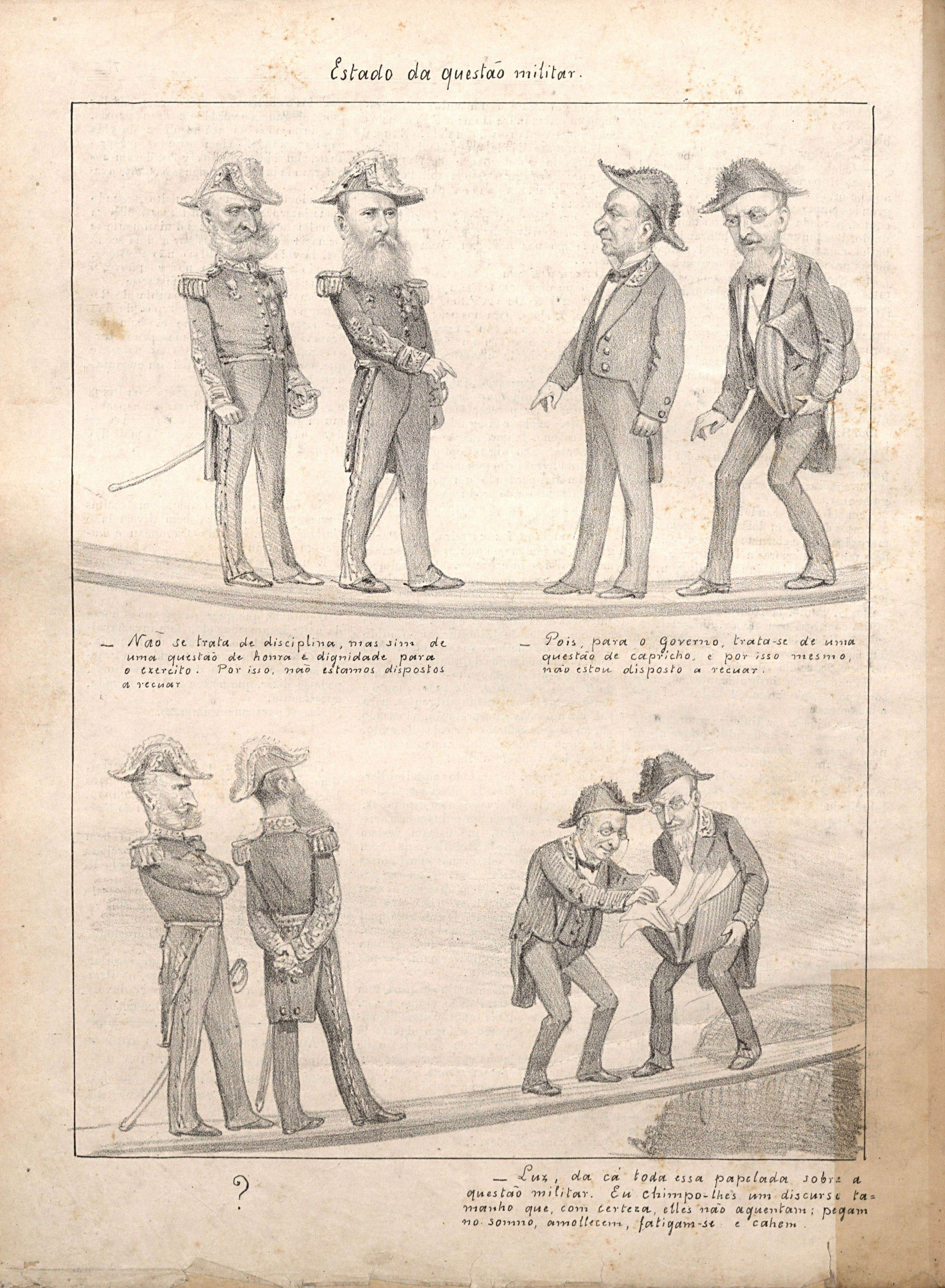
The state of the military question. A drawing published in the magazine Revista Illustrada by Angelo Agostini in 1887 satirizing the impasse between the military and civilian authorities

The Military Question was a series of incidents between officers of the Imperial Brazilian Army and civilian authorities of the Empire of Brazil that occurred between 1884 and 1887. This clash between military and civilians worsened the empire's political crisis and gave new impetus to the republican movement in the country. Just like abolitionism and the Religious Issue, the so-called military question contributed to the crisis of the imperial regime in Brazil, culminating in the proclamation of the republic in 1889.

== Background ==
The Imperial Brazilian Army had little political power in the Empire of Brazil until the Paraguayan War (1864–1870). This lack of influence was evident in the 1850 reform, when the then minister of war, Felizardo de Sousa e Melo, determined that promotions would be made based on merit rather than aristocratic origin and established a degree at the Military Academy as a requirement to reach the officer corps. In this way, the elite lost interest in military careers, and positions began to be filled by the children of military personnel and small employees.

The Brazilian victory in the Paraguayan War was decisive both for the consolidation of the army and for the formation of an institutional consciousness among the military. After the conflict, military officers entered the cabinet more frequently, while the army took control of the National Guard and by 1873 had established a nationwide monopoly on organized violence. Furthermore, the five-year stay of the regular army and volunteer corps in the Platine republics also contributed to the spread of republicanism among the troops. Once the conflict was over, army officers had high expectations regarding recognition of their sacrifices and achievements during the long campaign. The imperial government, in turn, afraid that a group of ex-combatants, armed and influenced by their superiors, could become involved in violent clashes against the regime, opted for a discreet reception and measures for a rapid demobilization and fragmentation of the units. In the officers' view, such an attitude represented a disregard for military honor and merits.

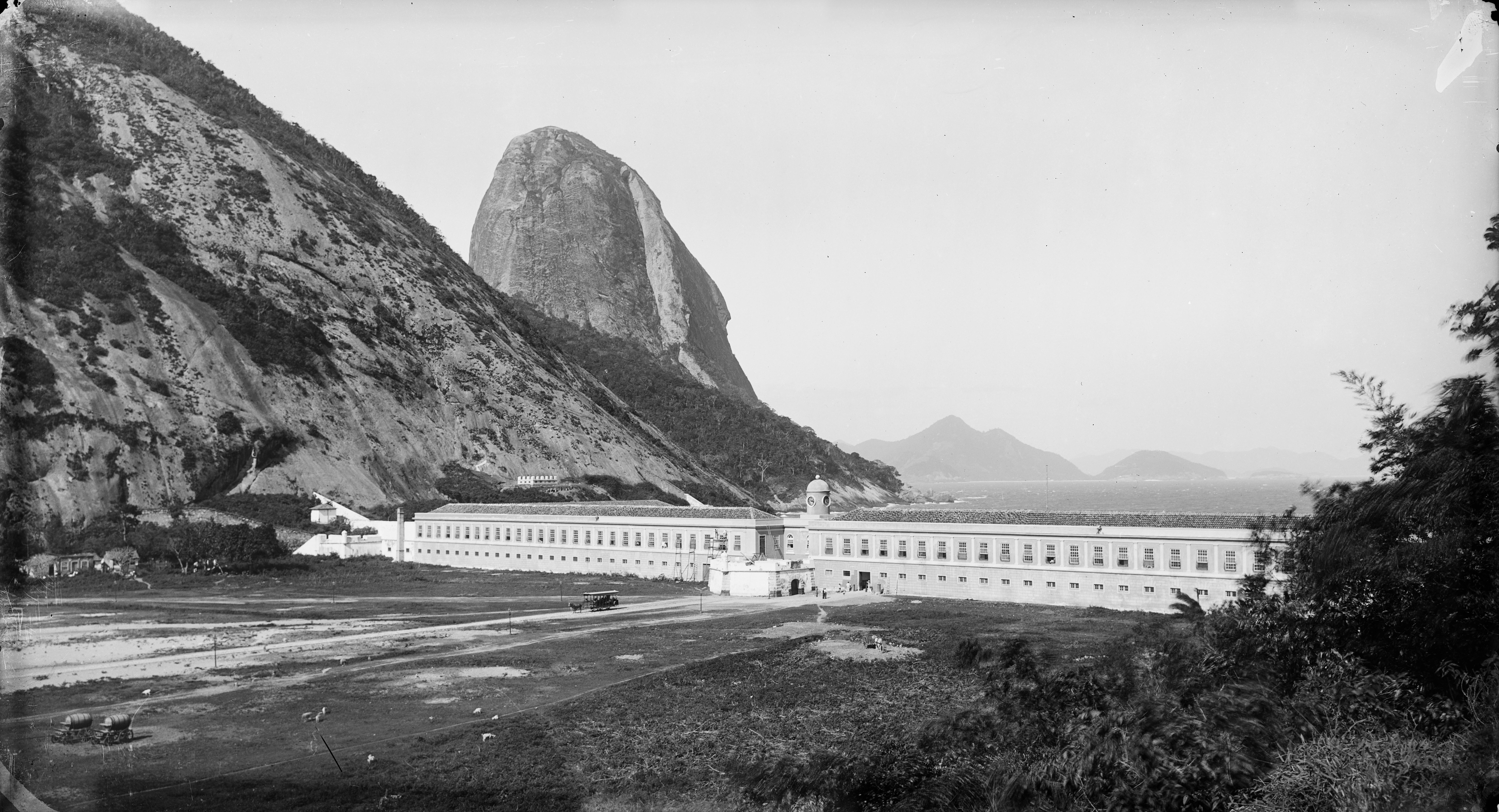
The Military School of Praia Vermelha, picture by Marc Ferrez

In 1871, a group of 40 officers founded the Military Institute to fight for improvements in the army. They offered the institute's presidency to Gaston, the Count of Eu, who was married to princess Isabel, the emperor's daughter and heir to the Brazilian throne. The Council of State deemed the institute a threat to discipline, however, and Gaston refused the offer, ending the group. Over the course of the decade, low ranking officers who had fought in the war received few promotions and cuts in their pay. The army's budget was also reduced. The military feared that the army would be supplanted by the National Guard. Students at the Military School of Praia Vermelha were becoming increasingly ideologically tied to the army as an institution. They lacked prestige among the civilian elite, but their formation was robust. Their teaching at the school was influenced by positivism, which had as one of its main advocates Benjamin Constant, a teacher at the school.

== Incidents ==
=== Sena Madureira ===
In 1883, the Viscount of Paranaguá proposed a bill that made mount of piety contributions mandatory for soldiers. The proposal raised the first disagreements between army officers and the political class. Antônio de Sena Madureira, a prestigious officer and a friend of emperor Pedro II, publicly criticized the proposal and was punished without major repercussions. The episode was the harbinger of even more serious conflicts that would soon take over the Brazilian parliament.

The following year, Sena Madureira, who was then in charge of the Campo Grande Shooting School, in Rio de Janeiro, authorized the school's students to organize a reception, with expressions of appreciation, for the rafter Francisco José do Nascimento, a black abolitionist from Ceará who became famous for his resistance to boarding slaves that would be sent from Fortaleza to Rio de Janeiro. The students' gesture and the school director's authorization clearly demonstrated the military's adherence to the abolitionist cause, which at that point had already become a consensual agenda among the military. In order to impose punishment on the abolitionist officer, the then minister of war, Senator Franco de Sá, ordered him to be questioned by the army's adjutant general. Sena Madureira did not accept the order and claimed that only his direct superior (the Count of Eu) could ask him for explanations about his activities as a soldier. In response to the act of insubordination, the Ministry of War reprimanded Sena Madureira and transferred him to the Rio Pardo Shooting School, in the province of Rio Grande do Sul. The military were also prohibited from speaking out in the press. The prohibitions imposed on military personnel from speaking out in the press and the punishments resulting from non-compliance with this imposition became the focus of tensions between army officers and central government authorities.

=== Colonel Cunha Matos affair ===
In August 1885, during a routine inspection in Piauí, Colonel Ernesto Augusto da Cunha Matos discovered misappropriation of supplies in the unit commanded by Captain Pedro José de Lima. Given the signs of corruption, Cunha Matos requested the opening of an investigation on the facts and the removal of Pedro José de Lima. The latter, however, had links with Simplício de Resende, a deputy for Piauí, who from the Chamber of Deputies' tribune alleged that Cunha Matos' conduct was motivated by political reasons. Taking advantage of his parliamentary prerogatives, Simplício de Resende went further and made insulting statements about Cunha Matos, publicly declaring that the colonel, when taken prisoner in the Paraguayan War, had gone to the extreme of opening fire on his fellow Brazilian comrades.

Cunha Matos' reaction came through articles published in the press. However, the colonel did not restrict himself to defending his own image but made direct criticisms of the minister of war, Alfredo Chaves, who was a civilian. The minister immediately punished the officer with a reprimand and detention for 48 hours. Although this reaction was fully supported by the ministerial warnings of 1859, 1878, 1882, and 1885, the punishment had wide repercussions among military and political circles. Marshal José Antônio Correia da Câmara, the Viscount of Pelotas, who, in addition to being an army officer, held one of the Senate's seats, took on the defense of his army comrade in the Senate. In his statements, Pelotas vehemently criticized Alfredo Chaves' attitude and argued that the punishment represented a serious offense to the "honor of the uniform". In the heat of the debates, he had no embarrassment in saying that compensation for offended military honor was a right that was above the country's own laws.

== Deodoro and the proclamation of the republic ==
As military dissatisfaction grew, the republican movement gained strength among the troops. Finally, on 11 November 1889, in the midst of yet another crisis, civil and military figures, including Ruy Barbosa, Benjamin Constant, Aristides Lobo, and Quintino Bocaiúva, tried to convince Deodoro da Fonseca - a conservative and prestigious figure - to lead the movement against the monarchy. Reluctant at first, among other reasons for being a friend of the emperor, Fonseca ended up agreeing to at least overthrow the prime minister, Afonso Celso, the Viscount of Ouro Preto. Thus, taking command of the troops, in the early hours of 15 November, Fonseca went to the Ministry of War, where the monarchist leaders were meeting. All were deposed and the First Brazilian Republic was proclaimed in the country.
