= Manuel Pinto de Sousa Dantas =

Brazilian politician

Sousa Dantas
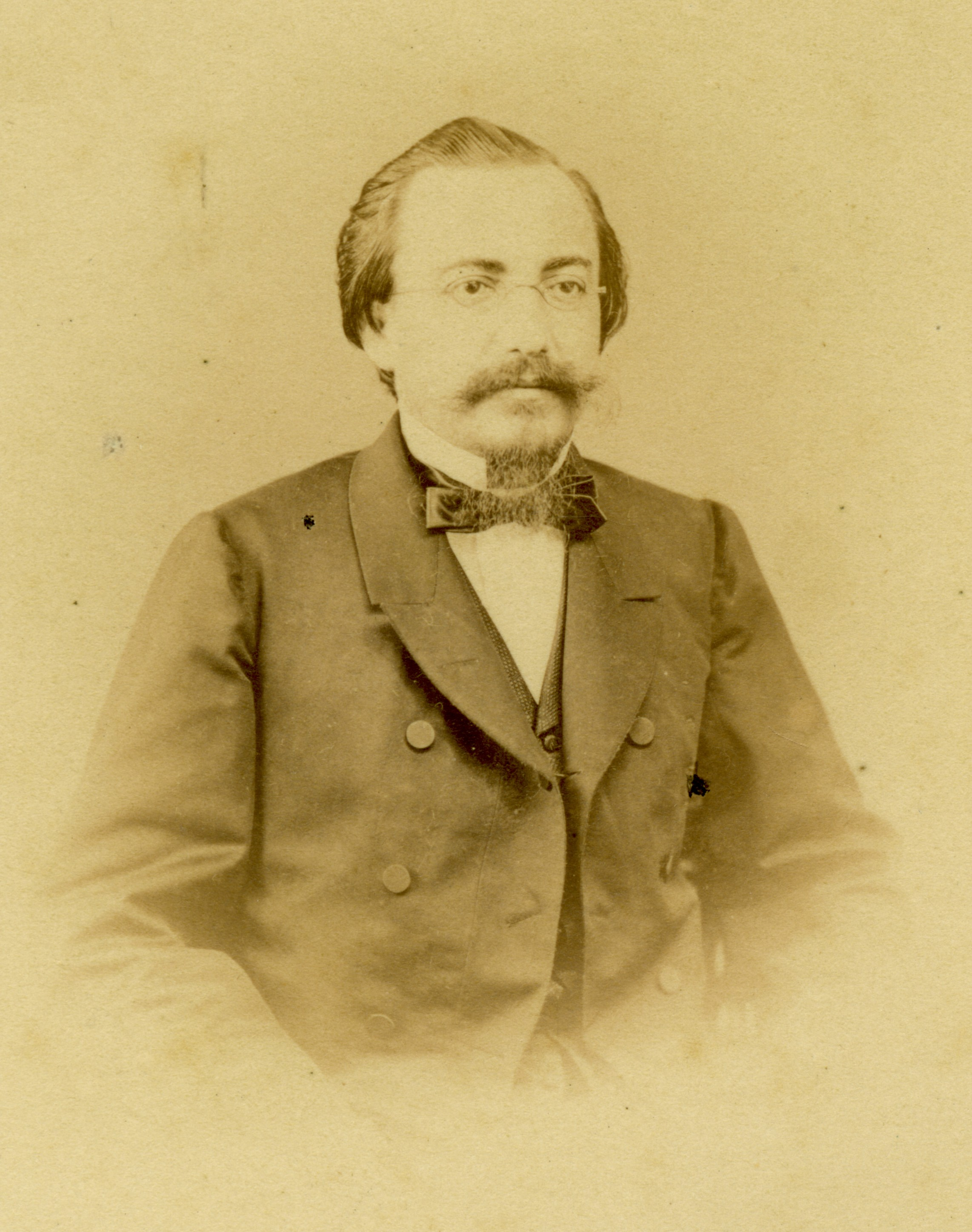
- Sousa Dantas, c. 1865

Prime Minister of Brazil
- In office 6 June 1884 – 6 May 1885
- Monarch: Pedro II of Brazil
- Preceded by: Lafayette Rodrigues Pereira
- Succeeded by: José Antônio Saraiva
Further offices held
Minister of Foreign Affairs
In office 22 December 1884 – 6 May 1885
Preceded by	João da Mata Machado
Succeeded by	Marquis of Paranaguá
Minister of Justice
In office 28 March 1880 – 21 January 1882
Preceded by	Lafayette Rodrigues Pereira
Succeeded by	Rodolfo Epifânio de Sousa Dantas
Minister of Agriculture
In office 2 August 1866 – 12 July 1868
Preceded by	Antonio Francisco de Paula Sousa
Succeeded by	Joaquim Antão Fernandes Leão

Personal details
- Born: 21 February 1831 Inhambupe, Empire of Brazil
- Died: 29 January 1894 (aged 62) Rio de Janeiro, Federal District, Brazil
- Party: Liberal
- Awards: Commander of the Imperial Order of Our Lord Jesus Christ

Manuel Pinto de Sousa Dantas (21 February 1831 – 29 January 1894) was a Brazilian lawyer, politician and Prime Minister of Brazil from 1884 to 1885, noted for his efforts to reform slavery.

== Early life and career ==
He earned a degree in law from the Faculty of Law of Recife in 1851. He began his political life in the Conservative Party, allied with the slave trader João Maurício Vanderlei, Baron of Cotegipe, but transferred to the Liberal Party, in which he became an important leader.

He was president (governor) of Alagoas and Bahia, general deputy (1857–1868), senator (1878), state councilor (1879), minister of Agriculture, Justice, Finance, Foreign Affairs and President of the Council of Ministers (Prime Minister) (1884).

== Prime minister ==
Manuel Pinto de Sousa Dantas organized and presided over the 32nd Cabinet, governing the country from 1884 to 1885. He was at the same time Minister of Finance as well as, temporarily, Foreign Minister. The main achievement of his government was the great impulse he gave to abolitionism, an idea that went beyond the simple manumission of slaves. It embraced a wider agenda of social reform, agrarian reform, and the democratization of education.

In 1884, faced with demands for more decisive action in slavery, emperor Pedro II appointed Dantas to seek a solution. The senator had the friendship and talent of deputy Ruy Barbosa, whom he invited to join the new cabinet. The Constitution, however, determined that, as a deputy, when Barbosa gave up his seat in the Assembly, he had to submit to a new election and, if defeated, he would lose his term and his portfolio. In conflict with the slave owners and the Church, Barbosa could not be sure of re-election and was left out of the ministry. However, he continued to collaborate with Sousa Dantas, with whom he had started his legal career. Sousa Dantas commissioned Barbosa to write "Bill48 A", which became known as the Dantas Bill, based on the senator's ideas.

== The Dantas Bill ==
The Dantas Bill began by defining some guidelines for emancipation: by the age of the slave; for the omission of registration; and for the transfer of the slave's legal domicile. By setting an upper age limit of 60 for slaves, without providing any type of compensation to owners, whose slaves were then emancipated, it unleashed a wave of protests even before the bill was presented to the Chamber. Basing emancipation on the omission of enrollment was apparently harmless. But, in fact, by forcing all slaves to be re-registered and identified in detail within a year, it would represent the almost immediate release of all those under the age of fourteen based on the "Law of the free womb". Those brought to Brazil after the prohibition of trafficking in 1831, or who were the children of smuggled slaves, were also to be declared free.

The bill also prohibited change of domicile, thereby preventing provinces such as Ceará and Amazonas from selling black slaves to large centers of slave labor in the southeast of the country. One of the biggest innovations however, was the provision of assistance to those who were freed, through the establishment of agricultural colonies for the unemployed. It also determined rules for a gradual transfer of leased land from the State to ex-slaves who would cultivate it, making them its owners.

With all these bold proposals, the Dantas Bill caused a lot of controversy. It divided the liberals and provoked the wrath of conservatives and slavers. Facing a motion of no confidence, but with the support of the Emperor, the Dantas Cabinet dissolved the Assembly and called new elections. They were the most violent in the history of the Empire, and produced a majority supported by the great slavers. Failing to get support, the Dantas Cabinet fell and the Emperor appointed José Antônio Saraiva to deal with the question of slavery. Saraiva introduced fundamental changes to the bill, which ended up being approved by a third Cabinet, that of Cotegipe. In its final form the Saraiva-Cotegipe Law was much narrower in scope than Sousa Dantas’ original bill.

== Bill B of 1887 ==
In June 1887, after leaving the position of President of the Council of Ministers, Dantas drafted a bill to free slaves. Bill B of 1887, as it became known, would have provided for the settlement of families of ex-slaves along the railways of the Empire, as part of a process of agrarian reform. The bill drew heavily on the Dantas Bill of 1884 and was signed jointly with 12 other liberal senators, among them the Viscount of Ouro Preto, the Viscount of Pelotas, Gaspar da Silveira Martins, Lafayette Rodrigues Pereira, pt:José Inácio Silveira da Mota and pt:José Rodrigues de Lima Duarte. Despite being rejected by the Senate, the bill strengthened the abolitionist movement, and promoted politicians such as Joaquim Nabuco, André Rebouças and even Isabel, Princess Imperial of Brazil to later argue for the settlement of ex-slave families.

== Later career ==
Under the First Brazilian Republic, he was appointed president of Banco do Brasil (1889), a post he held until his death.

== Family ==
Sousa Dantas was the father of Rodolfo Epifânio de Sousa Dantas, who succeeded him as Minister of Justice, and grandfather of the diplomat Luis Martins de Souza Dantas. His cousin was the Conservative senator pt: Cicero Dantas Martins.
