= Antônio de Sena Madureira =

Sena Madureira
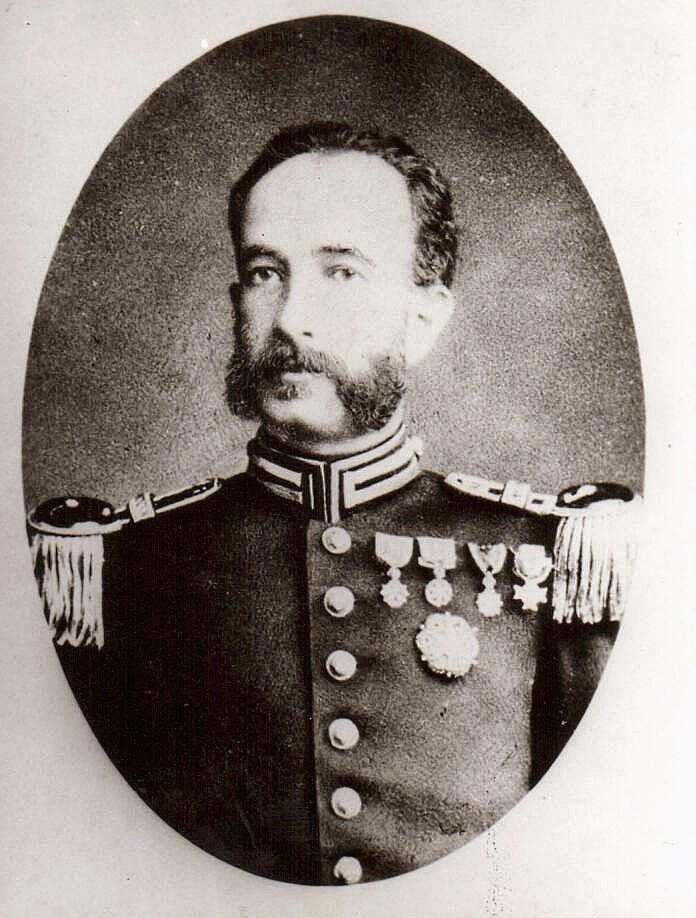
- Sena Madureira, c. 1880s
- Born: 1841; Recife, Empire of Brazil
- Died: 1889 (aged 47–48); Rio de Janeiro, Brazil
- Military career
- Allegiance: Empire of Brazil
- Branch: Imperial Brazilian Army
- Rank: Lieutenant colonel
- Conflicts: Paraguayan War

Antônio de Sena Madureira (1841–1889) was a lieutenant colonel of the Imperial Brazilian Army who fought in the Paraguayan War (1864–1870) and ended up becoming a prisoner of war of the Paraguayan troops under Francisco Solano López.

== Post-war events ==
In 1883, a group of military officers attacked a government project that intended to revise military retirement laws. With the criticism, the government withdrew from its decision and requested the cancellation of the project. On the other hand, the government also vetoed military use of the media to attack institutions or authorities of the Empire. In response to this reprimand, Sena Madureira published a text in which he greeted Francisco José do Nascimento, a raftsman from Ceará who refused to transport slaves to a slave ship. In complimenting Nascimento, Sena Madureira expressed his clear disgust for the slave system sustained by the Empire. In response, the government determined his transference from the capital to Rio Grande do Sul.

== Legacy ==
The city of Sena Madureira in Acre is named after him. There is also a street in São Paulo called Sena Madureira.
