= Pontes de Miranda =

Brazilian judge and diplomat (1892–1979)

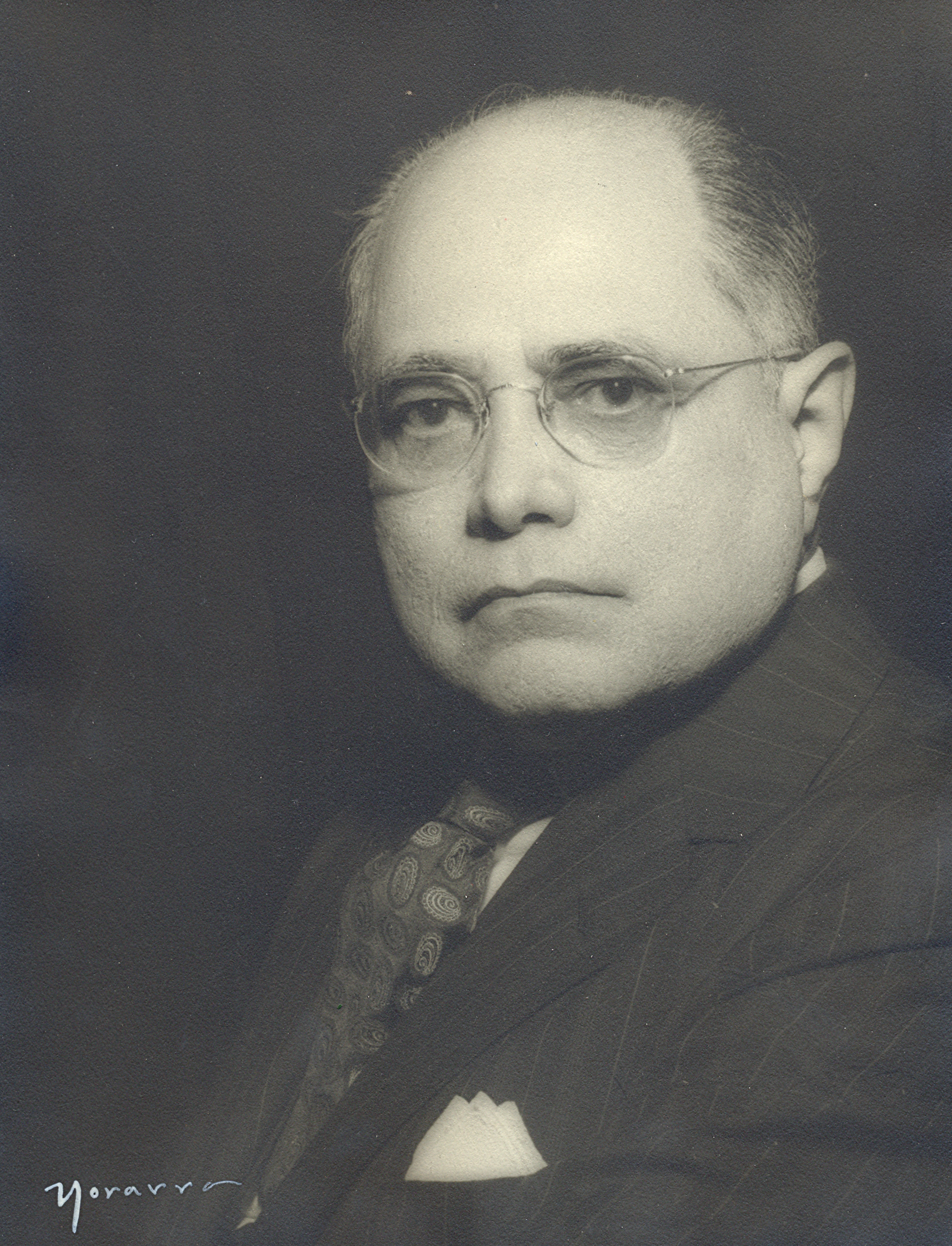
- Born: April 23, 1892; São Luis do Quitunde, Alagoas, Brazil
- Died: December 22, 1979 (aged 87); Rio de Janeiro, Brazil
- Education: Faculdade de Direito do Recife
- Occupations: Lawyer, jurist, professor, diplomat, essayist

Francisco Cavalcanti Pontes de Miranda (April 23, 1892 – December 22, 1979) was a prominent Brazilian jurist, judge, diplomat and professor of Law at the Federal University of Pernambuco. His main work, the Tratado de Direito Privado (pt), a sixty-volume collection that covers topics ranging from contracts to inheritance, is a seminal work in Brazilian legal doctrine. He occupied the 7th chair of the Brazilian Academy of Letters in 1979, until his death.

He is best known for the extent of his works, which covers several areas of knowledge, including Law, Sociology, Philosophy, Politics and Mathematics, and were published in Portuguese, German, French, Spanish and Italian.

== Life ==
Pontes de Miranda was born in São Luis do Quitunde - AL and studied in Recife, receiving his diploma in Law in 1911. He got married twice; in 1914, to Maria Beatriz Cavalcanti Pontes de Miranda; and in 1952, to Cardilli Pontes de Miranda; five children would result from these two marriages.

After beginning his career as a lawyer, Pontes de Miranda become a judge in 1924. In 1939, he left the Court of Appeal in which he presided, to become the Brazilian ambassador in Colombia.

Pontes de Miranda was also a professor. He taught law at The Hague Academy of International Law in 1932 and received honorary degrees from several Brazilian major universities.

He died at the age of 87, in Rio de Janeiro, victim of a heart attack. More than forty years after his death, Pontes de Miranda is still one of the most cited Brazilian jurists.

== Works ==
Pontes de Miranda has written 29 works, which spread over 144 volumes, ranging from scientific to literary subjects. His literary efforts include both prose and poetry. However, he is best regarded for his scientific works, and, especially, his eight treatises, all of which are dedicated to the study of law.

Although Pontes de Miranda has written important treatises in several areas of law, including Constitutional Law, Criminal Law and Procedural Law, his best known work is the Treatise of Private Law (Tratado de Direito Privado), whose first volumes were published in 1955, but which was concluded only in 1970. This treatise is a vast piece of work, comprising 60 volumes and 30 thousand pages. It is considered one of the longest treatises ever written by a single person.

Preceded by Hermes Lima	Brazilian Academy of Letters - Occupant of the 7th chair 1979	Succeeded by Diná Silveira de Queirós
