= Lafayette Rodrigues Pereira =

Brazilian politician

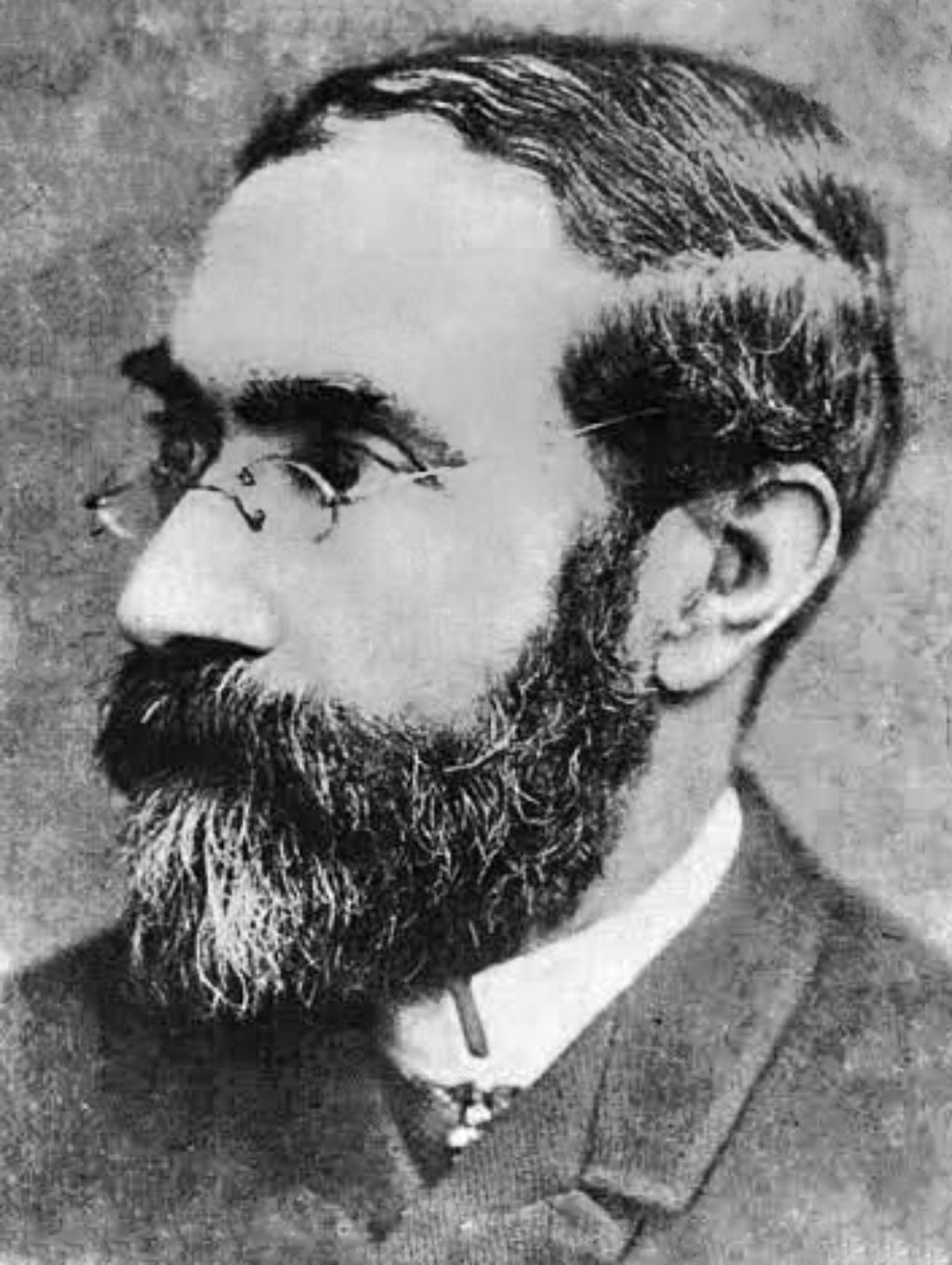

Prime Minister of Brazil
- In office 24 May 1883 – 6 June 1884
- Monarch: Pedro II of Brazil
- Preceded by: Marquis of Paranaguá
- Succeeded by: Sousa Dantas

Minister of Justice
- In office 5 January 1878 – 28 March 1880
- Preceded by: Francisco Cerqueira
- Succeeded by: Sousa Dantas

Personal details
- Born: 28 March 1834 Conselheiro Lafaiete, Minas Gerais, Empire of Brazil
- Died: 29 January 1917 (aged 82) Rio de Janeiro, Federal District, Brazil
- Awards: Grand Cross of The Imperial Order of Our Lord Jesus Christ, The Imperial Order of the Rose

Lafayette Rodrigues Pereira (28 March 1834 – 29 January 1917), was a Brazilian landowner, lawyer, journalist, diplomat and politician. He was governor of the provinces of Ceará (1864–65) and Maranhão (1865–66) and served as Prime Minister of Brazil from May 24, 1883, to June 6, 1884.

== Biography ==
He was born 28 March 1834 in the municipality currently known as Conselheiro Lafaiete, which was then called Queluz. He was the son of Antônio Rodrigues Pereira, baron of Pouso Alegre, and of Clara Lima Rodrigues, baroness of Pouso Alegre. He was the nephew of Alcides Rodrigues Pereira, Baron de Lamim. His family owned the historic Macacos Farm.

After completing his primary and secondary studies, he left for São Paulo, enrolling in the Faculty of Law in 1853. Lafayette was the best student in his class, which included Paulino Soares de Sousa, 1st Viscount of Uruguai.

At the end of his studies, in 1857, at the age of twenty-three, he left for Ouro Preto, where he was public prosecutor. By the following year, he had already moved to Rio de Janeiro and started working at the law firms of Andrade Figueira and Augusto Teixeira de Freitas.

== Journalism ==
During his time in law and politics, he also founded, with Pedro Luís and Flávio Farnese, the newspaper "Atualidade" a newspaper in which he wrote articles from 1858 to 1860. This Rio title was distinguished by its political and literary content and for its strongly liberal positions. Later, he was also editor of the newspapers "Le Brésil", "A Opinión Liberal" (1866), "Diário do Povo" (1866) and "A República" (1870–1874).

== Republican sympathies and public office ==
On December 3, 1870, the Republican Manifesto, written by Quintino Bocaiuva was published in the first issue of A República. Lafayette was the editor and his name also appeared as one of the manifesto's most important signatories. Later, he claimed that he had not personally signed the manifesto, having only attended an initial meeting making plans to found the Republican Club. However, at this meeting, he was acclaimed secretary of the new association.

In 1878, Lafayette accepted the post of Minister of Justice in the Sinimbu Cabinet. As he was known for his Republican sympathies, his contradictory attitude was criticized in the Senate and House. Lafayette defended himself by explaining the reasons why he accepted the appointment. In this political episode, as in other later ones, Lafayette's arguments showed him to be a formidable orator and master of irony.

In 1879, the Minas Gerais electorate placed his name on the list of three names from which Emperor Pedro II was to choose a senator. Although Lafayette did not receive the most votes, the emperor chose him. Lafayette had "slipped up(wards)" as his political opponents said.

== President of the Council of Ministers ==
On May 24, 1883, at the invitation of the Emperor, Senator Lafayette assumed the position of President of the council (Prime Minister) and Minister of Finance. The Lafayette cabinet lasted a year and twelve days. Its period of office and was dominated by the so-called Military Question.

On 6 June 1884, the Lafayette cabinet was replaced by a new one led by Manuel Pinto de Sousa Dantas. Lafayette then began to serve Brazil in other roles: as a senator, state councilor, diplomat and, above all, a jurist and writer.

== Diplomatic activities ==
On 30 May 1885 Emperor Pedro II appointed him minister on a special mission to Chile, to serve as an arbitrator in the Italian, English and French claims arising from the War of the Pacific. Arriving in Santiago, he invited all the arbitrators to legally accept the basic procedural norms, drew up a basic regulation of evidence and managed to get all the competing nations to agree.

According to Mario Barros van Buren "If you compare the work of the arbitral tribunals that operated in Chile with all the processes for debts and indemnities that were known in America, it can really be said that the process in Chile set a precedent and a legal basis of international importance. He [i.e. Pereira] was treated on the same level as a European power and his views, not always easy, were respected. This may seem normal these days, but it was a great triumph in 1882 and a very rare case in the continent's diplomatic history. The truly remarkable prestige and intelligence of the arbitrator Rodrigues Pereira contributed to this."

In 1889, he was once again accredited as a minister on a special mission, together with Amaral Valente and Salvador de Mendonça, in the Brazilian delegation to the First International Conference of American States. He left this post on November 17, 1889, when he declined the renewal of his powers by the Provisional Government of the newly proclaimed Republic. For this reason he did not sign the final acts that established the International Union of American Republics.

== Last years ==
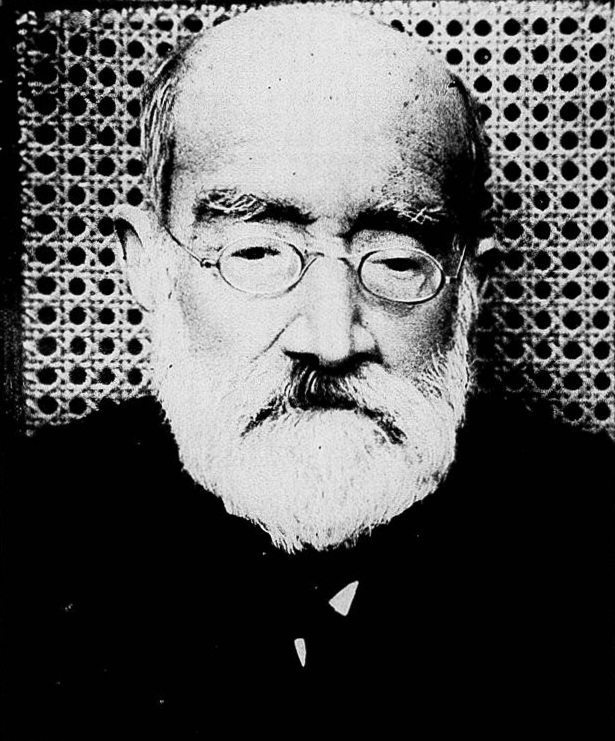
Lafeyette in old age

Because of his outstanding contribution to jurisprudence, he was elected in 1908 to occupy chair 23 of the Brazilian Academy of Letters, which had been previously occupied by Machado de Assis.

His daughter, Corina Lafayette, married José Bonifácio de Andrada e Silva, who became an important Brazilian diplomat; and his daughter Sylvia married Gustavo de Sousa Bandeira, son of jurist and Academician João Carneiro de Sousa Bandeira.

He died 29 January 1917 in Rio de Janeiro. His ashes were laid to rest next to the remains of his parents in the parish church of Nossa Senhora da Conceição, Barão de Queluz square, in the center of Conselheiro Lafaiete, Minas Gerais.

== Works ==
- Direitos de Familia (Family Law) (1869)
- Direito das Cousas (Property Law) (1877)
- Princípios de Direito Internacional (Principles of International Law) (1902)
