= List of ambassadors of Burundi to the United States =

Coordinates: 33.944174°N 118.221186°W

Ambassador of Burundi to the United States
- Umuserukizi w'Uburundi muri Leta Zunze Ubumwe za Amerika
- Coat of arms of Burundi
- Incumbent; Jean Bosco Barege since February 27, 2024
- Style: His/Her Excellency
- Residence: 2233 Wisconsin Ave NW #408, Washington, DC 20007 (Embassy offices)
- Inaugural holder: Léon Ndenzako
- Formation: January 11, 1965
- Website: https://burundiembassy.us/

The Burundian Ambassador to the United States is the official representative of the Government of Burundi to the Government of the United States. The Ambassador, with residence in Washington D.C., is concurrently accredited to Brasília.

== List of representatives ==
Diplomatic agreement/designated	Diplomatic accreditation	Ambassador	Observations	List of presidents of Burundi	List of presidents of the United States	Term end
July 1, 1962			Independence of Burundi	Mwambutsa IV Bangiriceng of Burundi	John F. Kennedy	
October 18, 1962		Pascal Bubiriza		Mwambutsa IV Bangiriceng of Burundi	Lyndon B. Johnson	
May 15, 1963		Joseph Mbazumutima	Agreement, Nomination subsequently withdrawn	Mwambutsa IV Bangiriceng of Burundi	Lyndon B. Johnson	
October 29, 1963	December 13, 1963	Léon Ndenzako		Mwambutsa IV Bangiriceng of Burundi	Lyndon B. Johnson	
January 13, 1966		François Kisukurume	Chargé d'affaires	Mwambutsa IV Bangiriceng of Burundi	Lyndon B. Johnson	
May 1, 1967	May 10, 1967	Térence Nsanzé		Michel Micombero	Lyndon B. Johnson	
April 16, 1973	May 1, 1973	Joseph Ndabaniwe		Michel Micombero	Richard Nixon	
April 10, 1976		Clement Sambira	Chargé d'affaires	Jean-Baptiste Bagaza	Gerald Ford	
January 9, 1976	November 24, 1976	Clement Sambira		Jean-Baptiste Bagaza	Gerald Ford	
November 26, 1978		Laurent Nzeyimana	Chargé d'affaires	Jean-Baptiste Bagaza	Jimmy Carter	
November 30, 1979	January 31, 1980	Simon Sabimbona	1976 to 1979 he was Burundian Ambassador to China.	Jean-Baptiste Bagaza	Jimmy Carter	
October 3, 1985	November 5, 1985	Edouard Kadigiri		Jean-Baptiste Bagaza	Ronald Reagan	
November 1, 1989	December 18, 1989	Julien Kavakure		Pierre Buyoya	George H. W. Bush	
November 24, 1993	December 9, 1993	Jacques Bacamurwanko		François Ngeze	Bill Clinton	
February 8, 1995	March 20, 1995	Severin Ntahomvikiye		Sylvestre Ntibantunganya	Bill Clinton	
December 21, 1998	January 21, 1999	Thomas Ndikimana		Pierre Buyoya	Bill Clinton	
November 20, 2002	December 8, 2002	Antoine Ntamobwa		Pierre Buyoya	George W. Bush	
October 3, 2006	December 8, 2009	Celestin Niyongabo		Pierre Nkurunziza	George W. Bush	
September 18, 2009	February 4, 2014	Angele Niyuhire		Pierre Nkurunziza	Barack Obama	
April 16, 2014	May 21, 2014	Ernest Ndabashinze	Was appointed Ambassador to the UK in 2017	Pierre Nkurunziza	Barack Obama	April 2017
	September 20, 2019	Jean Gaudence Sindayiga		Pierre Nkurunziza	Donald J. Trump	
April 27, 2021		Jean de Dieu Ndikumana		Évariste Ndayishimiye	Joseph Biden	
December 5, 2023	February 27, 2024	Jean Bosco Barege		Évariste Ndayishimiye	Joseph Biden	
