= Pascal Bubiriza =

Burundian Hutu diplomat and government minister

Burundian Ambassador to the United States
- In office October 18, 1962 – December 13, 1963
- Succeeded by: Leon Ndenzako

Burundian Ambassador to Ethiopia
- In office May 1965 – 1967

Burundian Minister of Interior
- In office June 1963 – March 1964
- Succeeded by: July 15, 1972 – June 5, 1973: Albert Shibura

Burundian Ambassador to the Soviet Union
- In office May 1965 – 1967
- Preceded by: Joseph Mahenehene
- Succeeded by: François Kisukurume

Ministre de la Communication et de l'information, Porte-parole du gouvernement
- In office 1969 – April 30, 1972
- Succeeded by: 2001–2003: fr:Albert Mbonerane; August 30, 2005: Karenga Ramadhani; 2005 – 2007: Hafsa Mossi; January 2009: Vénérand Bakevyumusaya.

Personal details
- Born: November 20, 1932 Commune of Rugazi, Muhinga Province
- Died: April 30, 1972 (aged 39)
- Education: secondary school, he studied at a Catholic seminary; Troupe Scolaire d'Astrida the 1929 created Educational Centre in Butare (Ruanda).

Pascal Bubiriza (November 20, 1932 – April 30, 1972) was a Burundian Hutu diplomat, minister of interior and minister of communication.

== Career ==
- From 1954 to 1961, he was employed in judiciary and local administration.
- From 20 October 1961 to 1 July 1962, he was chef de Cabinet in the government of André Muhirwa
- In 1962, he was designated Burundian Ambassador to the United States and was the first Permanent Representative to the Headquarters of the United Nations.
- From June 1963 to March 1964, he was Minister of Interior, Security, Immigration and State Administration.
- From April 1964 to May 1965, he was ambassador in the Foreign Ministry.
- From May 1965 to 1967, he was ambassador in Addis Ababa Ethiopia and was accredited as representative to the Organisation of African Unity and as ambassador to the government in Khartoum (Sudan)
- From 1967 to 1969, he was ambassador in Moscow.
- In 1969, he was designated Minister of Communication.
