= Francisco de Paula Brochado da Rocha =

Prime Minister of Brazil in 1962

His Excellency Brochado da Rocha

Prime Minister of Brazil
- In office 12 July 1962 – 18 September 1962
- President: João Goulart
- Preceded by: Tancredo Neves
- Succeeded by: Hermes Lima

General Consultant of the Republic
- In office 23 November 1955 – 30 January 1956
- President: Nereu Ramos
- Preceded by: Temístocles Cavalcanti
- Succeeded by: Gonçalves de Oliveira

State Deputy of Rio Grande do Sul
- In office 10 March 1947 – 31 January 1951
- Constituency: At-large

Personal details
- Born: 8 August 1910 Porto Alegre, Rio Grande do Sul, Brazil
- Died: 26 September 1962 (aged 52) Porto Alegre, Rio Grande do Sul, Brazil
- Party: PSD (1946–1962)
- Spouse: Jurema Caruso
- Education: Faculty of Law of Porto Alegre (LLB)
- Occupation: Lawyer; Politician
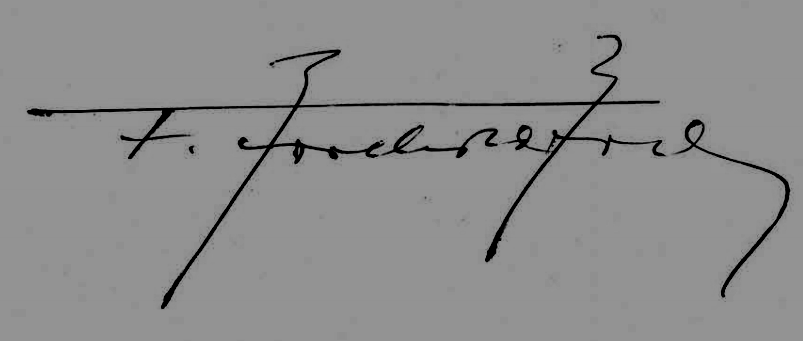
- Signature

Francisco de Paula Brochado da Rocha (Brazilian Portuguese: [fɾɐ̃ˈsisku dʒi ˈpawlɐ bɾoˈʃadu da ˈʁɔʃɐ]; 8 August 1910 – 26 September 1962) was a Brazilian counsel, professor and politician.

He was the son of the former mayor Porto Alegre, Otavio Rocha and Rocha Inácia, brother Antonio da Rocha and José Diogo da Rocha. While still a student, participated in the Revolution of 1930, when he was wounded during the assault on the headquarters of the Third Army, Rua da Praia, in Porto Alegre, on October 3. Due to injury, he lost a leg and started using a mechanical prosthesis.

In 1932, he graduated from the Law School of Porto Alegre, which now belongs to the Federal University of Rio Grande do Sul, where he was later Professor of Constitutional Law.

It was the city attorney of Porto Alegre, state deputy elected by the PSD for the 38th Legislature of the Legislative Assembly of Rio Grande do Sul, from 1947 to 1951.

He was proprietor of the state departments of Education and Culture, and the Interior and Justice, during the government of Leonel Brizola in Rio Grande do Sul participated actively in the Legality Campaign in 1961, making the connection between the government and Brizola nationalist sectors of the Third Army that would support the movement that secured the possession of João Goulart, after the resignation of Jânio Quadros.

At the federal level, was a consultant of the Republic, a member of the Federal Council of Education, Minister of Finance and Chairman of the Council of Ministers (July 12, 1962 to September 18, 1962) during the brief parliamentary regime that followed the inauguration of João Goulart. As chairman, he worked for short parliamentary experience now seen as virtually doomed. He announced his resignation on September 14, 1962, left office on September 18 and died eight days after leaving office.

Political offices
| Preceded by Tancredo Neves | Prime Minister of the United States of Brazil; 1962 | Succeeded by Hermes Lima |
