= Hermes Lima =

Prime Minister of Brazil from 1962 to 1963

His Excellency Hermes Lima

Justice of the Supreme Federal Court
- In office 26 June 1963 – 19 January 1969 (Note: Removed from office by Institutional Act Number Six.)
- Nominated by: João Goulart
- Preceded by: Barros Barreto
- Succeeded by: Seat abolished

Prime Minister of Brazil
- In office 18 September 1962 – 23 January 1963
- President: João Goulart
- Preceded by: Brochado da Rocha
- Succeeded by: Office abolished

Minister of Foreign Affairs
- In office 18 September 1962 – 18 June 1963
- President: João Goulart
- Preceded by: Afonso Arinos de Melo Franco
- Succeeded by: Evandro Lins e Silva

Minister of Labour and Social Security
- In office 13 July 1962 – 31 August 1962
- Prime Minister: Brochado da Rocha
- Preceded by: André Franco Montoro
- Succeeded by: João Pinheiro Neto

Chief of Staff of the Presidency
- In office 12 September 1961 – 13 July 1962
- President: João Goulart
- Preceded by: Floriano Augusto Ramos
- Succeeded by: Evandro Lins e Silva

Member of the Chamber of Deputies
- In office 5 February 1946 – 1 February 1951
- Constituency: Federal District

Personal details
- Born: 22 December 1902 Livramento de Nossa Senhora, Bahia, Brazil
- Died: 10 October 1978 (aged 75) Rio de Janeiro, Rio de Janeiro, Brazil
- Party: UDN (1945–47); PSB (1947–50); PTB (1950–63)
- Spouse: Maria Moreira Dias
- Profession: Professor and judge

Hermes Lima (Brazilian Portuguese: [ˈɛʁmiz ˈlimɐ]; 22 December 1902 – 10 October 1978) was a Brazilian politician who was the prime minister of Brazil, jurist, and winner of the 1975 Prêmio Machado de Assis.

== Political career ==
He originally became an elected federal deputy of the National Democratic Union in 1945, but two years later co-founded and joined the Brazilian Socialist Party. He was described as one of the members of the party who was a "liberal with a legal background." Under João Goulart he served as Labour Minister and later as Prime Minister (from 18 September 1962 until 23 January 1963). He would go on to serve in the Brazilian Supreme Court before being forced into retirement by the military dictatorship in 1969.

== Notes ==
Honorary titles
| Preceded by Afonso Pena Júnior | 5th Academic of the 7th chair of the Brazilian Academy of Letters; December 18, 1968–October 10, 1978 | Succeeded by Pontes de Miranda |
Legal offices
| Preceded by Frederico de Barros Barreto | Justice of the Supreme Federal Court; 1963–69 | Seat abolished |
Political offices
| Preceded by Floriano Augusto Ramos | Chief of Staff of the Presidency; 1961–62 | Succeeded by Evandro Lins e Silva |
| Preceded by André Franco Montoro | Minister of Labour and Social Security; 1962 | Succeeded by João Pinheiro Neto |
| Preceded by Afonso Arinos de Melo Franco | Minister of Foreign Affairs; 1962–63 | Succeeded by Evandro Lins e Silva |
| Preceded by Brochado da Rocha | Prime Minister of Brazil; 1962–63 | Position abolished |
