= Parnaguá =

Parnagua
- Municipality
- Coordinates: 10°13′S 44°38′W
- Country: Brazil
- Region: Northeast
- State: Piauí
- Mesoregion: Southeast
- Elevation: 1,095 ft (334 m)

Population (2020)
  - Total: 10,819
- Time zone: UTC−3 (BRT)
- Postal code: 64970/000
- Area code: +55 89

Parnagua is a municipality in the state of Piauí in the Northeast region of Brazil.

== See also ==
- List of municipalities in Piauí
