= Evandro Lins e Silva =

Brazilian lawyer, journalist, writer and politician

- Lins e Silva in the 1960s.

Justice of the Supreme Federal Court
- In office 4 September 1963 – 16 January 1969; Suspended by the AI-5
- Appointed by: João Goulart
- Preceded by: Ary de Azevedo Franco
- Succeeded by: Seat extinct by the AI-6

Minister of Foreign Affairs
- In office 18 June 1963 – 22 August 1963
- President: João Goulart
- Preceded by: Hermes Lima
- Succeeded by: João Augusto de Araújo Castro

Chief of Staff of the Presidency
- In office 24 January 1963 – 18 June 1963
- President: João Goulart
- Preceded by: Hermes Lima
- Succeeded by: Darcy Ribeiro

Prosecutor General of the Republic
- In office 14 September 1961 – 23 January 1962
- Appointed by: João Goulart
- Prime Minister: Tancredo Neves
- Preceded by: Joaquim Canuto Mendes de Almeida
- Succeeded by: Cândido de Oliveira Neto

Personal details
- Born: Evandro Cavalcanti Lins e Silva; 18 January 1912 Parnaíba, Piauí, Brazil
- Died: 17 December 2002 (aged 90) Rio de Janeiro, Rio de Janeiro, Brazil
- Cause of death: Head injury
- Resting place: St. John Baptist Cemitery
- Party: PSB (1947–1961)
- Parents: Raul Lins e Silva (father); Maria do Carmo Uchôa Cavalcanti (mother)
- Education: National Faculty of Law
- Occupation: Lawyer • journalist • writer • politician

Evandro Cavalcanti Lins e Silva (18 January 1912 – 17 December 2002) was a Brazilian lawyer, journalist, writer and politician. He was Prosecutor General of the Republic, Chief of Staff, Minister of Foreign Affairs, and Justice of the Supreme Federal Court.

He was also a lawyer of criminal affairs and taught criminal law in the then Guanabara State University (current Rio de Janeiro State University (UERJ)).

He was a member of the Brazilian Academy of Letters.

== Biography ==
Evandro Lins e Silva is the son of Maria do Carmo Uchôa Cavalcanti and Raul Lins e Silva, both from Pernambuco. His mom was niece-granddaughter of justice João Barbalho Uchôa Cavalcanti. His father, a graduate from the Faculty of Law of Federal University of Pernambuco (UFPE), made his career as a lawyer.

Lins e Silva graduated at the Faculty of Law of Federal University of Rio de Janeiro (UFRJ) on 19 November 1932. While a student, he worked as a journalist, which office kept even after graduating. As a lawyer, he specialized in criminal law and developed intense professional activity, until 1961, in the Jury Court, in criminal courts, in superior courts, and in the Supreme Federal Court, defending, moreover, countless trials of great repercussion, including in politics, before the National Security Court and the Militar Justice.

In 1956, he was hired as professor of the Chair of Criminal Law History and Penitenciary Science, in the doctorate degree, in the Faculty of Law of the then Guanabara State, which he taught until 1961.

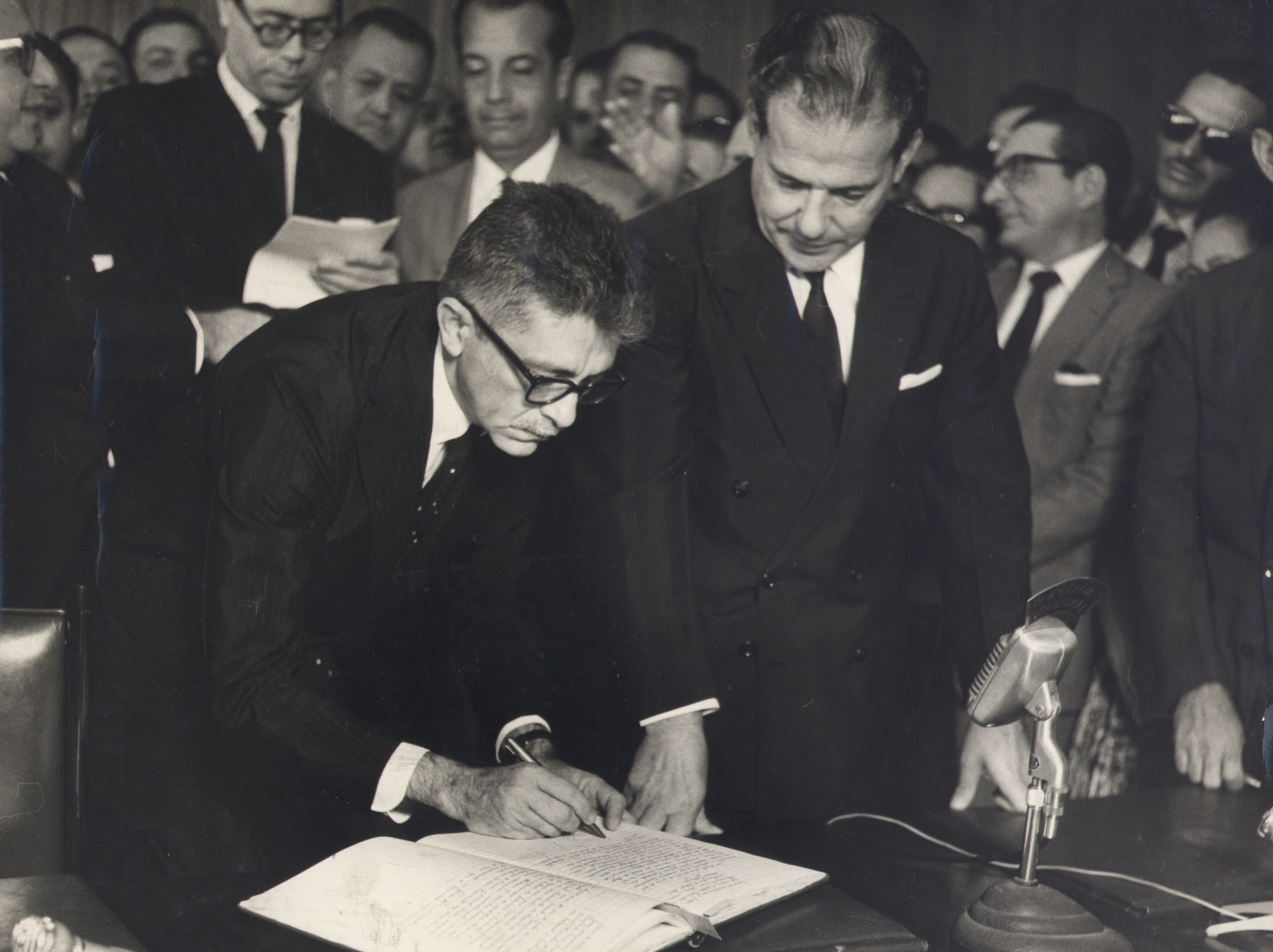
Evandro Lins e Silva takes office as Chief of Staff of the Presidency, 1963.

He was one of the founders of the Brazilian Socialist Party in 1947, alongside Rubem Braga, Joel Silveira, and others. He was also Chief of Staff of the Presidency and Minister of Foreign Affairs in 1963.

He held the position of Prosecutor General of the Republic between September 1961 and January 1962, and of Justice of the Supreme Federal Court between September 1963 and January 1969, when he was forced to retire because of the Institutional Act No. 5.

He was member of the Federal Council of the Order of Attorneys of Brazil (OAB) in many periods, between 1944 and 1961, and, after retired, between 1983 and 1995.

He was one of the lawyers responsible for the impeachment request against president Fernando Collor de Mello.

As a writer, he published many books, such as A Defesa tem a Palavra, Arca de Guardados and O Salão dos Passos Perdidos. He also coined the expression legitimate defense of honor (Portuguese: legítima defesa da honra) to justify the murder of Ângela Diniz by his client Doca Street.

Evandro Lins e Silva, despite his old age, was in good health. He died in an accident, on 17 September 2002, after hitting his head in a sidewalk.

In Parnaíba, his birthplace, was constructed a memorial in his honor, with project signed by Oscar Niemeyer.

== Brazilian Academy of Letters ==
Fifth occupant of the Chair No. 1, elected on 16 April 1998, succeeding Bernardo Élis and received on 11 August 1998 by Academic Josué Montello. Received the Academic Raymundo Faoro on 17 September 2002.

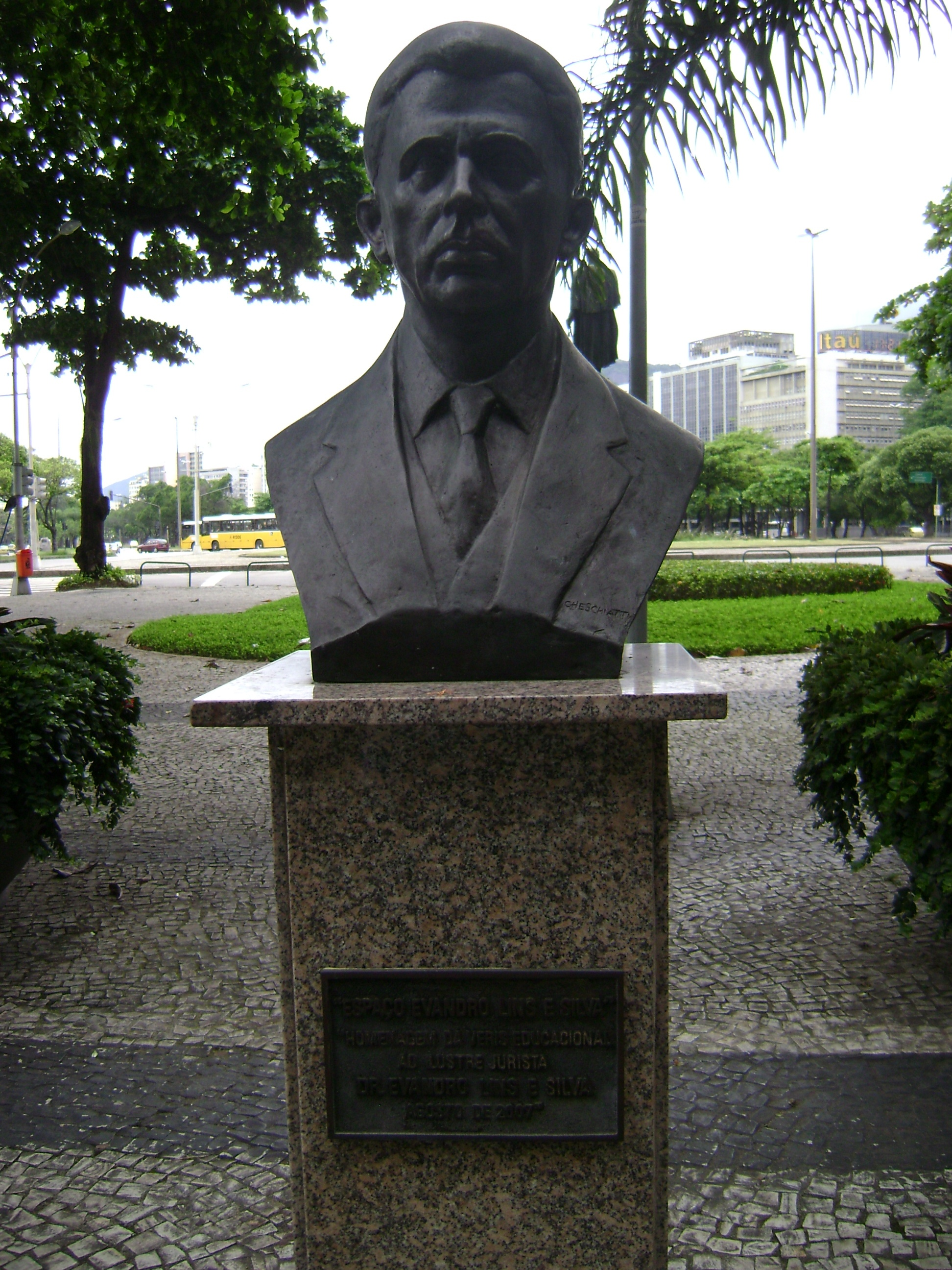
Bust of Lins e Silva in the Justice Evandro Lins e Silva Palace (OAB Piauí).

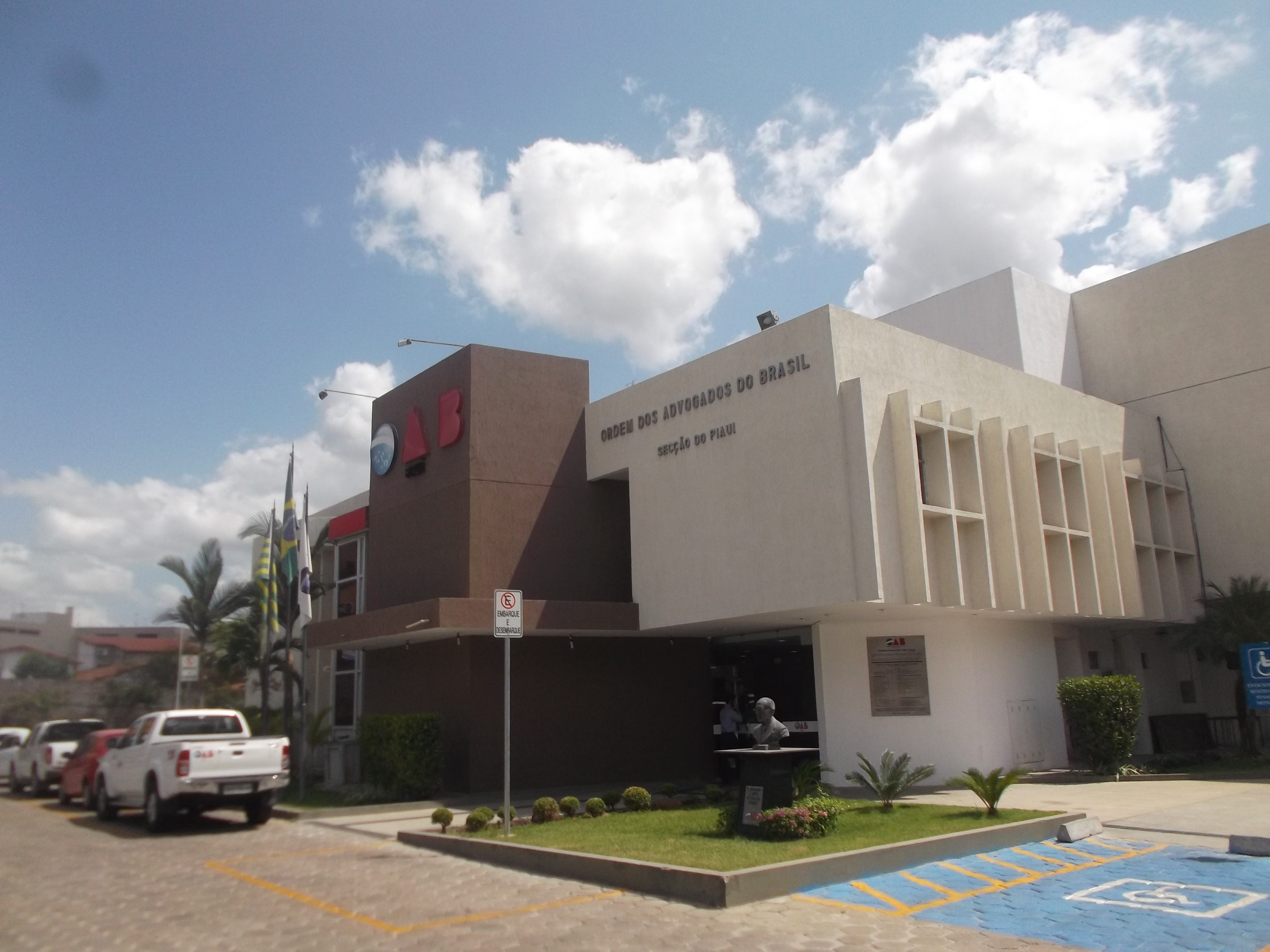
Justice Evandro Lins e Silva Palace, Piauí regional head office of the Order of Attorneys of Brazil.

== See also ==
- Supreme Federal Court
- Brazilian Academy of Letters
- João Goulart

Legal offices
Preceded by Joaquim Canuto Mendes de Almeida	Prosecutor General of the Republic; 1961–62	Succeeded by Cândido de Oliveira Neto
Preceded by Ary de Azevedo Franco	Justice of the Supreme Federal Court; 1963–69	Extinct by the AI-5
Government offices
Preceded by Hermes Lima	Chief of Staff of the Presidency; 1963	Succeeded by Darcy Ribeiro
Preceded by Hermes Lima	Minister of Foreign Affairs; 1963	Succeeded by João Augusto de Araújo Castro
Honorary titles
Preceded by Bernardo Élis	5th Academic of the 1st Chair of the Brazilian Academy of Letters; 1998–2002	Succeeded by Ana Maria Machado
