= Léon Ndenzako =

Burundian diplomat

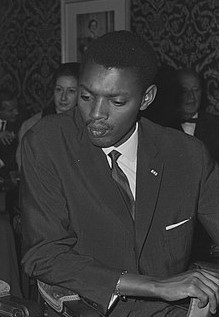
- Ndenzako in 1962

Burundian Ambassador to the United States
- In office December 1963 – 1966
- Monarch: Mwambutsa IV

Secretary of State for Diplomatic Affairs of Burundi
- In office 12 July 1966 – 28 November 1966
- Monarch: Ntare V

Personal details
- Born: c. 1931

Léon Ndenzako (born c. 1931) was a Burundian diplomat. He served as the Burundian Ambassador to the United States from 1963 to 1966 and as the Secretary of State for Diplomatic Affairs from July to November 1966.

== Early life ==
Léon Ndenzako was born about 1931. He was ethnically Tutsi and the son of chief Raphael Ndenzako. He attended the Groupe Scolaire de Astrida from 1954 to 1955.

== Career ==
From 1950 to 1960 Ndenzako served as a chief in Bubanza Province. He was strong supporter of the Burundian monarchy and joined the Union for National Progress (Union pour le Progres National, UPRONA). In early 1960 he went to Belgium to receive training in the Belgian Foreign Ministry. The following year he served as the Mwami's private secretary, chief of protocol, and Grand Marshall of the Court. He continued to serve as grand marshal until he was appointed Ambassador to the United States in August 1963. He arrived in Washington D.C. in early October and presented his letters of credence and began working in December. Following Burundi's recognition of the People's Republic of China, he told United States Assistant Secretary of State G. Mennen Williams that the move should be interpreted as Burundi's fulfillment of its non-alignment policy and expressed his hope it that would not endanger the "friendly relations" between the two countries.

Following a coup attempt in Burundi in October 1965, the Burundian Foreign Ministry ordered the expulsion of the United States Ambassador and two of his aides in January 1966 for "rightly or wrongly" being suspected of involvement. Upon hearing of this, the United States Department of State summoned Ndenzako to protest the action and formally requested that the Burundian government withdraw him. Ndenzako subsequently returned to Burundi and helped Crown Prince Charles Ndizeye plan his coup on 8 July. A new government was installed on 12 July under Prime Minister Michel Micombero with Ndenzako serving as Secretary of State for Diplomatic Affairs.

By mid-August tensions had developed between Ndenzako and other personalities associated with the prince and the radicals in the government. On 11 September, the head of the Fédération des Travailleurs du Burundi called for the execution of Ndenzako, Secretary of State for Economic Affairs Rémy Nsengyumva, and former prime minister André Muhirwa and denounced them as the "people's enemies". When a circular repeating the message was issued the following day, a large crowd gathered in the stadium in Bujumbura in anticipation of the executions—which did not occur. On 28 November Micombero launched a military coup which overthrew the monarchy and led to the proclamation of a republic. Ndenzako was placed under arrest and detained until he was granted amnesty and released on 30 June 1968. He subsequently became head of Burundi's sports association.

== Personal life ==
In September 1956, Ndenzako married Princess Régine Kanyange, the youngest daughter of Mwami Mwambutsa IV. By 1963, they had three children together.

== Works cited ==
- Dobbs, Charles M. (2010). Triangles, Symbols, and Constraints: The United States, the Soviet Union, and the People's Republic of China, 1963-1969. Rowman & Littlefield. ISBN 9780761849995.
- Ghislain, Jean (1970). La Féodalité au Burundi (PDF) (in French). Brussels: Académie royale des Sciences d’Outre-Mer. OCLC 2115033.
- Lemarchand, René (1970). Rwanda and Burundi. New York: Praeger Publishers. OCLC 254366212.
- Weinstein, Warren (1976). Historical Dictionary of Burundi. Metuchen: Scarecrow Press. ISBN 9780810809628.
