= João Augusto de Araújo Castro =

Brazilian lawyer and diplomat

- Araújo Castro in 1964

Minister of Foreign Affairs
- In office 22 August 1963 – 31 March 1964
- President: João Goulart
- Preceded by: Evandro Lins
- Succeeded by: Vasco Leitão

Personal details
- Born: 27 August 1919 Rio de Janeiro, Brazil
- Died: 9 December 1975 (aged 56) Washington, D.C., United States

João Augusto de Araujo Castro (August 27, 1919, Rio de Janeiro – December 9, 1975, Washington, D.C.) was a Brazilian lawyer and diplomat, serving as Brazilian Ambassador to the US and UN, and Minister of Foreign Affairs during the government of João Goulart.
