= Dragão do Mar =

Brazilian pilot and abolitionist

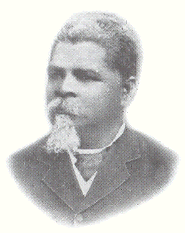
Francisco José do Nascimento

Francisco José do Nascimento (April 15, 1839 – March 5, 1914), known as Dragão do Mar (Sea Dragon), was an Afro-Brazilian raft fisherman (jangadeiro), pilot and abolitionist figure, who in 1881 led a strike of his fellow jangadeiros in the port of Fortaleza, state of Ceará, refusing to transport enslaved black people to be sold in Rio de Janeiro and other Brazilian provinces.

== Life ==
Francisco José do Nascimento was born in Canoa Quebrada. He was known as "Chico da Matilde", after his mother, Matilde da Conceição. His father died when he was eight years old. Unable to raise her child, Matilde sent Nascimento to work for the Portuguese commander José Raimundo de Carvalho. He learned to read and write and worked at the commander's sailboat Tubarão until he was 20 years old. Nascimento married to Joaquina Francisca and worked at the port of Fortaleza as a pilot, driving ships to the harbor.

The state of Ceará was struck by a severe drought in 1877–78. Several landowners rushed to sell their slaves to the southern port of Rio de Janeiro. In the state, there was a strong abolitionist movement, led by white intellectuals. Nascimento, a mulatto, distraught with his role in the slavery, associated with the abolitionists. On August 30, 1881, the jangadeiros of Fortaleza were on strike, refusing to transport black slaves to southern Brazil. Though fishermen, the jangadeiros made extra income providing transport on their jangadas to ocean-going vessels. The port authority fired Nascimento and other jangadeiros. Nevertheless, the state of Ceará abolished slavery in 1884, four years before the rest of Brazil. Nascimento was celebrated and invited to visit Rio de Janeiro. There he was received as a hero by the local abolitionists; the writer Aluísio de Azevedo was the first to refer to him as "Dragão do Mar".

Nascimento died in 1914, in Fortaleza. His grave, lost for many years, was found in July 2020 in the Cemitério de São João Batista.

== Honors ==
The Dragão do Mar Center of Art and Culture, founded in 1999 in Fortaleza, was named after him.

In 2017, Francisco José do Nascimento's name was written into the Book of Steel (also known as The Book of National Heroes) kept at the Tancredo Neves Pantheon of the Fatherland and Freedom, the national cenotaph, in Brasília.
