= João Lustosa da Cunha Paranaguá, Marquis of Paranaguá =

Brazilian politician and lawyer

Marquis of Paranaguá
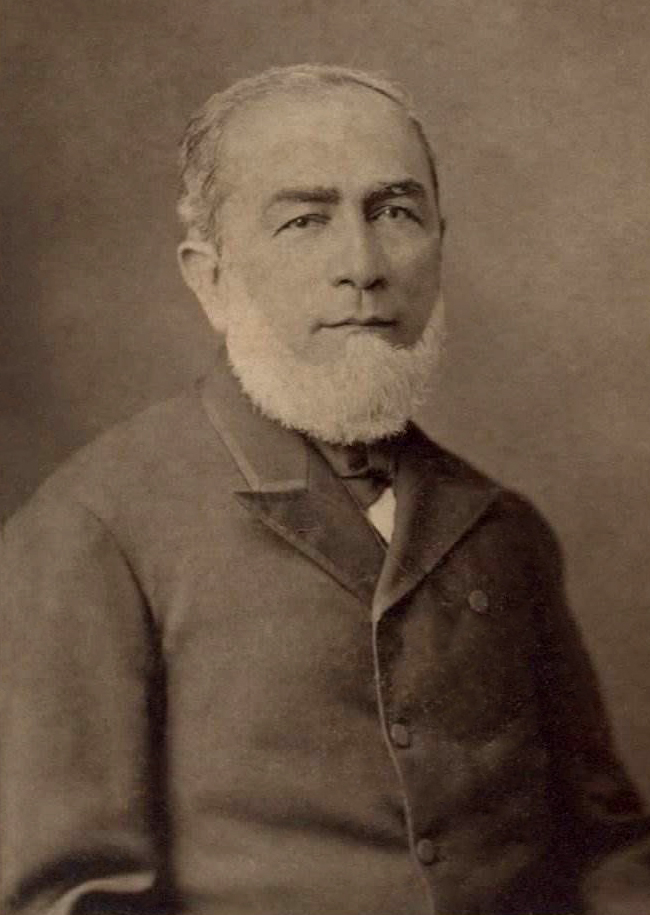
- Paranaguá, 1874

Prime Minister of Brazil
- In office 3 July 1882 – 24 May 1883
- Monarch: Pedro II
- Preceded by: Martinho da Silva Campos
- Succeeded by: Lafayette Rodrigues Pereira
Further offices held
Minister of Justice
In office 3 August 1866 – 27 October 1866
Preceded by	José de Araújo Filho
Succeeded by	Martim Ribeiro de Andrada
In office 10 August 1859 – 3 March 1861
Preceded by	Manuel Vieira Tosta
Succeeded by	Francisco de Saião Lobato
Minister of War
In office 7 October 1866 – 16 July 1868
Preceded by	Baron of Uruguaiana
Succeeded by	Manuel Vieira Tosta

Personal details
- Born: August 21, 1821 Parnaguá, Kingdom of Brazil
- Died: 9 February 1912 (aged 90) Rio de Janeiro, Brazil
- Party: Liberal Party
- Occupation: Politician
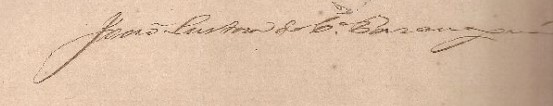
- Signature

João Lustosa da Cunha Paranaguá, the Marquis of Paranaguá (August 21, 1821 in Parnaguá – February 9, 1912 in Rio de Janeiro), was a politician and lawyer of the Empire of Brazil having been President of the Council of Ministers of Brazil on the 26th cabinet during the reign of Pedro II.
