= List of ministers of finance of Brazil =

Minister of Finance of Brazil
- Ministro da Fazenda
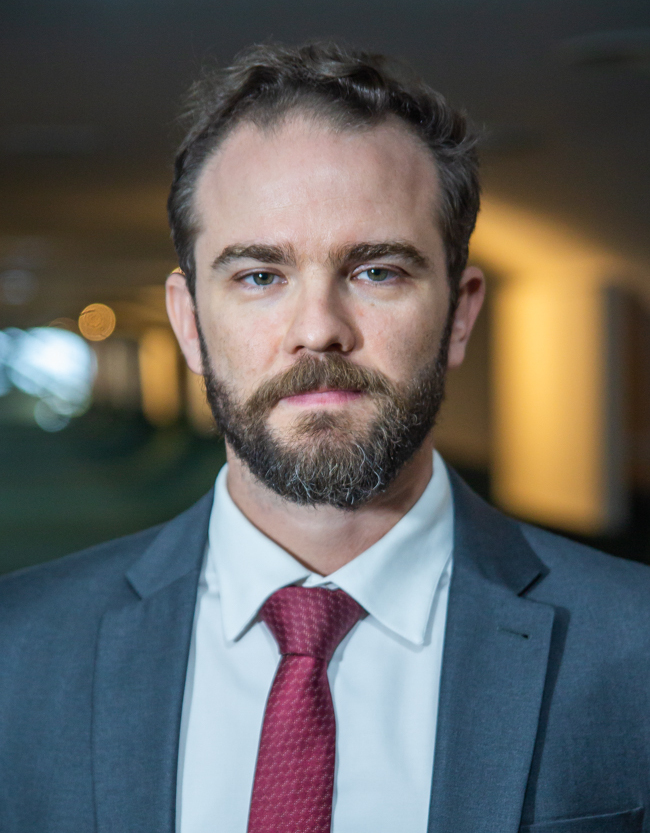
- Incumbent; Dario Durigan since 20 March 2026
- Style: Mr. Minister (informal); The Most Excellent Minister (formal); His Excellency (diplomatic)
- Type: Ministry
- Abbreviation: MF
- Member of: the Cabinet; National Defense Council
- Reports to: the President
- Seat: Brasília, Federal District
- Appointer: President of Brazil
- Constituting instrument: Constitution of Brazil
- Formation: 11 March 1808; 218 years ago
- First holder: Fernando José de Portugal e Castro
- Salary: R$ 39,293.32 monthly
- Website: www.gov.br/fazenda/

This is a list of ministers of finance of Brazil.

== Colonial Brazil and United Kingdom of Portugal, Brazil and the Algarves ==
No.	Portrait	Minister	Took office	Left office	Time in office	Monarch
1	Fernando José de Portugal e Castro, 2nd Marquis of Aguiar	Fernando José de Portugal e Castro, 2nd Marquis of Aguiar (1752–1817)	11 March 1808	30 December 1816	8 years, 294 days	Maria I John VI
2	António de Araújo e Azevedo, 1st Earl of Barca	António de Araújo e Azevedo, 1st Earl of Barca (1754–1817)	30 December 1816	21 June 1817	173 days	John VI
3	João Paulo Bezerra de Seixas, Baron of Itaguaí	João Paulo Bezerra de Seixas, Baron of Itaguaí (1756–1817)	23 June 1817	28 November 1817	158 days	John VI
4	Tomás Antônio de Vila Nova Portugal	Tomás Antônio de Vila Nova Portugal (1755–1839)	28 November 1817	25 February 1821	3 years, 89 days	John VI
5	Diogo de Meneses	Diogo de Meneses (1788–1878)	25 February 1821	16 January 1822	325 days	John VI; Peter I
6	Caetano Pinto de Miranda Montenegro, 1st Marquis of Vila Real da Praia Grande	Caetano Pinto de Miranda Montenegro, 1st Marquis of Vila Real da Praia Grande (1748–1827)	16 January 1822	4 July 1822	169 days	Peter I
7	Martim Francisco Ribeiro de Andrada	Martim Francisco Ribeiro de Andrada (1775–1844)	4 July 1822	7 September 1822	65 days	Peter I

== Empire of Brazil ==
=== Reign of Pedro I ===
No.	Portrait	Minister	Took office	Left office	Time in office	Monarch
7	Martim Francisco Ribeiro de Andrada	Martim Francisco Ribeiro de Andrada (1775–1844)	7 September 1822	17 July 1823	313 days	Peter I
8	Manuel Jacinto Nogueira da Gama, Marquis of Baependi	Manuel Jacinto Nogueira da Gama, Marquis of Baependi (1765–1847)	17 July 1823	10 November 1823	116 days	Peter I
9	Sebastião Luís Tinoco da Silva	Sebastião Luís Tinoco da Silva (1758–1839)	10 November 1823	13 November 1823	3 days	Peter I
10	Mariano José Pereira da Fonseca, Marquis of Maricá	Mariano José Pereira da Fonseca, Marquis of Maricá (1773–1848)	13 November 1823	21 November 1825	2 years, 8 days	Peter I
11	Felisberto Caldeira Brant, Marquis of Barbacena	Felisberto Caldeira Brant, Marquis of Barbacena (1772–1842)	21 November 1825	20 January 1826	60 days	Peter I
12	Antônio Luís Pereira da Cunha, Marquis of Inhambupe	Antônio Luís Pereira da Cunha, Marquis of Inhambupe (1760–1837)	20 January 1826	21 January 1826	1 day	Peter I
13	Manuel Jacinto Nogueira da Gama, Marquis of Baependi	Manuel Jacinto Nogueira da Gama, Marquis of Baependi (1765–1847)	21 January 1826	16 January 1827	360 days	Peter I
14	João Severiano Maciel da Costa, Marquis of Queluz	João Severiano Maciel da Costa, Marquis of Queluz (1769–1833)	16 January 1827	20 November 1827	308 days	Peter I
15	Miguel Calmon du Pin e Almeida, Marquis of Abrantes	Miguel Calmon du Pin e Almeida, Marquis of Abrantes (1796–1865)	20 November 1827	15 June 1828	208 days	Peter I
16	José Clemente Pereira	José Clemente Pereira (1787–1854)	16 June 1828	18 June 1828	2 days	Peter I
17	José Bernardino Batista Pereira de Almeida	José Bernardino Batista Pereira de Almeida (1783–1861)	18 June 1828	25 September 1828	99 days	Peter I
18	Miguel Calmon du Pin e Almeida, Marquis of Abrantes	Miguel Calmon du Pin e Almeida, Marquis of Abrantes (1796–1865)	25 September 1828	4 December 1829	1 year, 70 days	Peter I
19	Felisberto Caldeira Brant, Marquis of Barbacena	Felisberto Caldeira Brant, Marquis of Barbacena (1772–1842)	4 December 1829	2 October 1830	302 days	Peter I
20	José Antônio Lisboa	José Antônio Lisboa (1777–1850)	2 October 1830	3 November 1830	32 days	Peter I
21	Antônio Francisco Cavalcanti de Albuquerque, Viscount of Albuquerque	Antônio Francisco Cavalcanti de Albuquerque, Viscount of Albuquerque (1797–1863)	3 November 1830	5 April 1831	153 days	Peter I
22	Manuel Jacinto Nogueira da Gama, Marquis of Baependi	Manuel Jacinto Nogueira da Gama, Marquis of Baependi (1765–1847)	5 April 1831	7 April 1831	2 days	Peter I

=== Regency period ===
No.	Portrait	Minister	Took office	Left office	Time in office	Regent
23	José Inácio Borges	José Inácio Borges (1770–1838)	7 April 1831	16 July 1831	100 days	Provisional Triumviral Regency
24	Bernardo Pereira de Vasconcelos	Bernardo Pereira de Vasconcelos (1795–1850)	16 July 1831	10 May 1832	299 days	Permanent Triumviral Regency
25	Joaquim Rodrigues Torres, Viscount of Itaboraí	Joaquim Rodrigues Torres, Viscount of Itaboraí (1802–1872)	10 May 1832	3 August 1832	0 days	Permanent Triumviral Regency
26	Antônio Francisco Cavalcanti de Albuquerque, Viscount of Albuquerque	Antônio Francisco Cavalcanti de Albuquerque, Viscount of Albuquerque (1797–1863)	3 August 1832	13 September 1832	41 days	Permanent Triumviral Regency
27	Nicolau Pereira de Campos Vergueiro	Nicolau Pereira de Campos Vergueiro (1778–1859)	13 September 1832	14 December 1832	92 days	Permanent Triumviral Regency
28	Cândido José de Araújo Viana, Marquis of Sapucaí	Cândido José de Araújo Viana, Marquis of Sapucaí (1793–1875)	14 December 1832	2 June 1834	1 year, 170 days	Permanent Triumviral Regency
29	Antônio Pinto Chichorro da Gama	Antônio Pinto Chichorro da Gama (1800–1887)	2 June 1834	7 October 1834	127 days	Permanent Triumviral Regency
30	Manuel do Nascimento Castro e Silva	Manuel do Nascimento Castro e Silva (1788–1846)	7 October 1834	16 May 1837	2 years, 221 days	Permanent Triumviral Regency; Diogo Feijó
31	Manuel Alves Branco, 2nd Viscount of Caravelas	Manuel Alves Branco, 2nd Viscount of Caravelas (1797–1855)	16 May 1837	19 September 1837	126 days	Diogo Feijó
32	Miguel Calmon du Pin e Almeida, Marquis of Abrantes	Miguel Calmon du Pin e Almeida, Marquis of Abrantes (1796–1865)	19 September 1837	16 April 1839	1 year, 209 days	Pedro de Araújo Lima, Marquis of Olinda
33	Cândido Batista de Oliveira	Cândido Batista de Oliveira (1801–1865)	16 April 1839	1 September 1839	138 days	Pedro de Araújo Lima, Marquis of Olinda
34	Manuel Alves Branco, 2nd Viscount of Caravelas	Manuel Alves Branco, 2nd Viscount of Caravelas (1797–1855)	1 September 1839	18 May 1840	260 days	Pedro de Araújo Lima, Marquis of Olinda
35	José Antônio da Silva Maia	José Antônio da Silva Maia (1789–1853)	18 May 1840	24 July 1840	67 days	Pedro de Araújo Lima, Marquis of Olinda

=== Reign of Pedro II ===
No.	Portrait	Minister	Took office	Left office	Time in office	Monarch
36	Martim Francisco Ribeiro de Andrada	Martim Francisco Ribeiro de Andrada (1775–1844)	24 July 1840	23 March 1841	242 days	Pedro II
37	Miguel Calmon du Pin e Almeida, Marquis of Abrantes	Miguel Calmon du Pin e Almeida, Marquis of Abrantes (1796–1865)	23 March 1841	20 January 1843	1 year, 303 days	Pedro II
38	Joaquim Francisco Viana	Joaquim Francisco Viana (1803–1864)	20 January 1843	2 February 1844	1 year, 13 days	Pedro II
39	Manuel Alves Branco, 2nd Viscount of Caravelas	Manuel Alves Branco, 2nd Viscount of Caravelas (1797–1855)	2 February 1844	2 May 1846	2 years, 89 days	Pedro II
40	Antônio Francisco Cavalcanti de Albuquerque, Viscount of Albuquerque	Antônio Francisco Cavalcanti de Albuquerque, Viscount of Albuquerque (1797–1863)	2 May 1846	17 May 1847	1 year, 15 days	Pedro II
–	José Joaquim Fernandes Torres	José Joaquim Fernandes Torres (1797–1869); Acting	17 May 1847	22 May 1847	5 days	Pedro II

No.	Portrait	Minister	Took office	Left office	Time in office	Prime Ministers
41	Manuel Alves Branco, 2nd Viscount of Caravelas	Manuel Alves Branco, 2nd Viscount of Caravelas (1797–1855)	22 May 1847	20 October 1847	151 days	Manuel Alves Branco, 2nd Viscount of Caravelas (Liberal)
–	Saturnino de Sousa e Oliveira Coutinho	Saturnino de Sousa e Oliveira Coutinho (1803–1848); Acting	20 October 1847	18 November 1847	29 days	Manuel Alves Branco, 2nd Viscount of Caravelas (Liberal)
42	Manuel Alves Branco, 2nd Viscount of Caravelas	Manuel Alves Branco, 2nd Viscount of Caravelas (1797–1855)	18 November 1847	8 March 1848	111 days	Manuel Alves Branco, 2nd Viscount of Caravelas (Liberal)
43	Antonio Paulino Limpo de Abreu, Viscount of Abaeté	Antonio Paulino Limpo de Abreu, Viscount of Abaeté (1798–1883)	8 March 1848	14 May 1848	67 days	José Carlos Pereira de Almeida Torres, Viscount of Macaé (Liberal)
44	Dias de Carvalho	Dias de Carvalho (1808–1881)	14 May 1848	31 May 1848	17 days	José Carlos Pereira de Almeida Torres, Viscount of Macaé (Liberal)
45	Francisco de Paula Sousa e Melo	Francisco de Paula Sousa e Melo (1791–1854)	31 May 1848	18 August 1848	79 days	Francisco de Paula Sousa e Melo (Liberal)
–	Bernardo de Sousa Franco, Viscount of Sousa Franco	Bernardo de Sousa Franco, Viscount of Sousa Franco (1805–1875); Acting	18 August 1848	29 September 1848	42 days	Francisco de Paula Sousa e Melo (Liberal)
46	Pedro de Araújo Lima, Marquis of Olinda	Pedro de Araújo Lima, Marquis of Olinda (1793–1870)	29 September 1848	6 October 1849	1 year, 7 days	Pedro de Araújo Lima, Marquis of Olinda (Conservative)
47	José Joaquim Fernandes Torres	José Joaquim Fernandes Torres (1797–1869)	6 October 1849	6 December 1850	2 years, 61 days	José da Costa Carvalho, Marquis of Monte Alegre (Conservative)
–	Paulino Soares de Sousa, 1st Viscount of Uruguai	Paulino Soares de Sousa, 1st Viscount of Uruguai (1807–1866); Acting	6 December 1850	13 January 1851	38 days	José da Costa Carvalho, Marquis of Monte Alegre (Conservative)
48	Joaquim Rodrigues Torres, Viscount of Itaboraí	Joaquim Rodrigues Torres, Viscount of Itaboraí (1802–1872)	13 January 1851	12 February 1853	2 years, 30 days	José da Costa Carvalho, Marquis of Monte Alegre (Conservative); Joaquim Rodrigues Torres, Viscount of Itaboraí (Conservative)
–	Manuel Felizardo de Sousa e Melo	Manuel Felizardo de Sousa e Melo (1805–1866); Acting	12 February 1853	6 September 1853	206 days	Joaquim Rodrigues Torres, Viscount of Itaboraí
49	Honório Hermeto Carneiro Leão, Marquis of Paraná	Honório Hermeto Carneiro Leão, Marquis of Paraná (1801–1856)	6 September 1853	12 January 1855	1 year, 128 days	Honório Hermeto Carneiro Leão, Marquis of Paraná (Conservative)
50	Antonio Paulino Limpo de Abreu, Viscount of Abaeté	Antonio Paulino Limpo de Abreu, Viscount of Abaeté (1798–1883)	12 January 1855	27 January 1855	15 days	Antonio Paulino Limpo de Abreu, Viscount of Abaeté (Conservative)
51	Honório Hermeto Carneiro Leão, Marquis of Paraná	Honório Hermeto Carneiro Leão, Marquis of Paraná (1801–1856)	27 January 1855	23 August 1856	1 year, 209 days	Antonio Paulino Limpo de Abreu, Viscount of Abaeté (Conservative)
52	João Maurício Vanderlei, Baron of Cotegipe	João Maurício Vanderlei, Baron of Cotegipe (1815–1889)	23 August 1856	4 May 1857	254 days	Antonio Paulino Limpo de Abreu, Viscount of Abaeté (Conservative)
53	Bernardo de Sousa Franco, Viscount of Sousa Franco	Bernardo de Sousa Franco, Viscount of Sousa Franco (1805–1875)	4 May 1857	12 December 1858	1 year, 222 days	Antonio Paulino Limpo de Abreu, Viscount of Abaeté (Conservative)
54	Francisco de Sales Torres Homem, Viscount of Inhomirim	Francisco de Sales Torres Homem, Viscount of Inhomirim (1812–1876)	12 December 1858	10 August 1859	241 days	Antonio Paulino Limpo de Abreu, Viscount of Abaeté (Conservative)
55	Ângelo Moniz da Silva Ferraz, Baron of Uruguaiana	Ângelo Moniz da Silva Ferraz, Baron of Uruguaiana (1812–1867)	10 August 1859	2 March 1861	1 year, 204 days	Ângelo Moniz da Silva Ferraz, Baron of Uruguaiana (Conservative)
56	José Paranhos, Viscount of Rio Branco	José Paranhos, Viscount of Rio Branco (1819–1880)	2 March 1861	24 May 1862	1 year, 83 days	Luís Alves de Lima e Silva, Duke of Caxias (Conservative)
57	Dias de Carvalho	Dias de Carvalho (1808–1881)	24 May 1862	30 May 1862	6 days	Zacarias de Góis e Vasconcelos (Progressive League)
58	Antônio Francisco Cavalcanti de Albuquerque, Viscount of Albuquerque	Antônio Francisco Cavalcanti de Albuquerque, Viscount of Albuquerque (1797–1863)	30 May 1862	8 April 1863	313 days	Pedro de Araújo Lima, Marquis of Olinda (Progressive League)
59	Miguel Calmon du Pin e Almeida	Miguel Calmon du Pin e Almeida (1796–1865)	8 April 1863	15 January 1864	282 days	Pedro de Araújo Lima, Marquis of Olinda (Progressive League)
60	Dias de Carvalho	Dias de Carvalho (1808–1881)	15 January 1864	31 August 1864	229 days	Zacarias de Góis e Vasconcelos (Progressive League)
61	Carlos Carneiro de Campos, 3rd Viscount of Caravelas	Carlos Carneiro de Campos, 3rd Viscount of Caravelas (1805–1878)	31 August 1864	12 May 1865	−111 days	Francisco José Furtado (Liberal)
62	Dias de Carvalho	Dias de Carvalho (1808–1881)	12 May 1864	4 March 1866	1 year, 296 days	Pedro de Araújo Lima, Marquis of Olinda (Liberal)
63	Francisco de Paula da Silveira Lobo	Francisco de Paula da Silveira Lobo (1826–1886)	4 March 1866	7 March 1866	3 days	Pedro de Araújo Lima, Marquis of Olinda (Liberal)
64	João da Silva Carrão	João da Silva Carrão (1810–1888)	7 March 1866	3 August 1866	149 days	Pedro de Araújo Lima, Marquis of Olinda (Liberal)
65	Zacarias de Góis e Vasconcelos	Zacarias de Góis e Vasconcelos (1815–1877)	3 August 1866	16 July 1868	1 year, 348 days	Zacarias de Góis e Vasconcelos (Liberal)
66	José Joaquim Fernandes Torres	José Joaquim Fernandes Torres (1797–1869)	16 July 1868	29 September 1870	2 years, 75 days	Joaquim Rodrigues Torres, Viscount of Itaboraí (Conservative)
67	Francisco de Sales Torres Homem, Viscount of Inhomirim	Francisco de Sales Torres Homem, Viscount of Inhomirim (1812–1876)	29 September 1870	7 March 1871	159 days	José Antônio Pimenta Bueno, Marquis of São Vicente (Conservative)
68	José Paranhos, Viscount of Rio Branco	José Paranhos, Viscount of Rio Branco (1819–1880)	7 March 1871	25 June 1875	4 years, 110 days	José Paranhos, Viscount of Rio Branco (Conservative)
69	João Maurício Vanderlei, Baron of Cotegipe	João Maurício Vanderlei, Baron of Cotegipe (1815–1889)	25 June 1875	5 February 1878	2 years, 225 days	Luís Alves de Lima e Silva, Duke of Caxias (Conservative)
70	João Lins Cansanção, Viscount of Sinimbu	João Lins Cansanção, Viscount of Sinimbu (1810–1906)	5 February 1878	13 February 1878	8 days	João Lins Cansanção, Viscount of Sinimbu (Liberal)
71	Gaspar da Silveira Martins	Gaspar da Silveira Martins (1835–1901)	13 February 1878	8 February 1879	360 days	João Lins Cansanção, Viscount of Sinimbu (Liberal)
72	Afonso Celso, Viscount of Ouro Preto	Afonso Celso, Viscount of Ouro Preto (1836–1912)	8 February 1879	28 March 1880	1 year, 49 days	João Lins Cansanção, Viscount of Sinimbu (Liberal)
73	José Antônio Saraiva	José Antônio Saraiva (1823–1895)	28 March 1880	21 January 1882	1 year, 299 days	José Antônio Saraiva (Liberal)
74	Martinho Álvares da Silva Campos	Martinho Álvares da Silva Campos (1816–1887)	21 January 1882	3 July 1882	163 days	Martinho Álvares da Silva Campos (Liberal)
75	João Lustosa da Cunha Paranaguá, Marquis of Paranaguá	João Lustosa da Cunha Paranaguá, Marquis of Paranaguá (1821–1912)	3 July 1882	24 May 1883	325 days	João Lustosa da Cunha Paranaguá, Marquis of Paranaguá (Liberal)
76	Lafayette Rodrigues Pereira	Lafayette Rodrigues Pereira (1834–1917)	24 May 1883	6 June 1884	1 year, 13 days	Lafayette Rodrigues Pereira (Liberal)
77	Manuel Pinto de Sousa Dantas	Manuel Pinto de Sousa Dantas (1831–1894)	6 June 1884	6 May 1885	334 days	Manuel Pinto de Sousa Dantas (Liberal)
78	José Antônio Saraiva	José Antônio Saraiva (1823–1895)	6 May 1885	20 August 1885	106 days	José Antônio Saraiva (Liberal)
79	Francisco Belisário Soares de Sousa	Francisco Belisário Soares de Sousa (1839–1889)	20 August 1885	10 March 1888	2 years, 203 days	João Maurício Vanderlei, Baron of Cotegipe (Conservative)
80	João Alfredo Correia de Oliveira	João Alfredo Correia de Oliveira (1835–1919)	10 March 1888	7 June 1889	1 year, 89 days	João Alfredo Correia de Oliveira (Conservative)
81	Afonso Celso, Viscount of Ouro Preto	Afonso Celso, Viscount of Ouro Preto (1836–1912)	7 June 1889	20 July 1889	43 days	Afonso Celso, Viscount of Ouro Preto (Liberal)
–	Cândido Luís Maria de Oliveira	Cândido Luís Maria de Oliveira (1845–1919); Acting	20 July 1889	28 July 1889	8 days	Afonso Celso, Viscount of Ouro Preto (Liberal)
82	Afonso Celso, Viscount of Ouro Preto	Afonso Celso, Viscount of Ouro Preto (1836–1912)	28 July 1889	15 November 1889	0 days	Afonso Celso, Viscount of Ouro Preto (Liberal)

== Republican period ==
=== First Brazilian Republic ===
No.	Portrait	Minister	Took office	Left office	Time in office	Party	President
83	Ruy Barbosa	Ruy Barbosa (1849–1923)	15 November 1889	21 January 1891	1 year, 67 days	Republican Party of São Paulo	Deodoro da Fonseca (Ind)
84	Tristão de Alencar Araripe	Tristão de Alencar Araripe (1821–1908)	21 January 1891	4 July 1891	164 days	Independent	Deodoro da Fonseca (Ind)
85	Henrique Pereira de Lucena	Henrique Pereira de Lucena (1835–1913)	4 July 1891	23 November 1891	142 days	Independent	Deodoro da Fonseca (Ind)
–	Antão Gonçalves de Faria	Antão Gonçalves de Faria (1854–1936); Acting	23 November 1891	26 November 1891	3 days	Independent	Floriano Peixoto (Ind)
86	Rodrigues Alves	Rodrigues Alves (1848–1919)	26 November 1891	31 August 1892	279 days	Republican Party of São Paulo	Floriano Peixoto (Ind)
87	Serzedelo Correia	Serzedelo Correia (1858–1932)	31 August 1892	30 April 1893	242 days	PRF	Floriano Peixoto (Ind)
88	Felisbelo Freire	Felisbelo Freire (1858–1916)	30 April 1893	18 August 1894	1 year, 110 days	Independent	Floriano Peixoto (Ind)
–	Alexandre Cassiano do Nascimento	Alexandre Cassiano do Nascimento (1856–1912); Acting	18 August 1894	15 November 1894	89 days	PRR	Floriano Peixoto (Ind)
89	Rodrigues Alves	Rodrigues Alves (1848–1919)	15 November 1894	20 November 1896	2 years, 5 days	Republican Party of São Paulo	Prudente de Morais (PR Federal)
90	Bernardino de Campos	Bernardino de Campos (1841–1915)	20 November 1896	15 November 1898	1 year, 360 days	Republican Party of São Paulo	Prudente de Morais (PR Federal)
91	Joaquim Murtinho	Joaquim Murtinho (1848–1911)	15 November 1898	2 September 1902	3 years, 291 days	Independent	Campos Sales (Republican Party of São Paulo)
92	Sabino Barroso	Sabino Barroso (1859–1919)	2 September 1902	15 November 1902	74 days	Minas Republican Party	Campos Sales (Republican Party of São Paulo)
93	Leopoldo de Bulhões	Leopoldo de Bulhões (1856–1928)	15 November 1902	15 November 1906	4 years, 0 days	PRF	Rodrigues Alves (Republican Party of São Paulo)
94	David Campista	David Campista (1863–1911)	15 November 1906	14 June 1909	2 years, 211 days	Minas Republican Party	Afonso Pena (Minas Republican Party)
95	Leopoldo de Bulhões	Leopoldo de Bulhões (1856–1928)	14 June 1909	15 November 1910	1 year, 154 days	PRF	Nilo Peçanha (PRF)
96	Francisco Sales	Francisco Sales (1863–1933)	15 November 1910	9 May 1913	2 years, 175 days	Minas Republican Party	Hermes da Fonseca (PRC)
97	Rivadávia Correia	Rivadávia Correia (1866–1920)	9 May 1913	15 November 1914	1 year, 190 days	PRF	Hermes da Fonseca (PRC)
98	Sabino Barroso	Sabino Barroso (1859–1919)	15 November 1914	31 May 1915	197 days	Minas Republican Party	Venceslau Brás (Minas Republican Party)
99	Pandiá Calógeras	Pandiá Calógeras (1870–1934)	1 June 1915	6 September 1917	2 years, 97 days	Minas Republican Party	Venceslau Brás (Minas Republican Party)
100	Antônio Carlos Ribeiro de Andrada IV	Antônio Carlos Ribeiro de Andrada IV (18370–1946)	6 September 1917	1 November 1918	1 year, 56 days	Minas Republican Party	Venceslau Brás (Minas Republican Party)
–	Augusto Tavares de Lira	Augusto Tavares de Lira (1872–1958); Acting	1 November 1918	15 November 1918	14 days	PRC	Venceslau Brás (Minas Republican Party)
101	Amaro Cavalcanti	Amaro Cavalcanti (1849–1922)	15 November 1918	17 January 1919	63 days	PRF	Delfim Moreira (Minas Republican Party)
102	João Ribeiro de Oliveira e Sousa	João Ribeiro de Oliveira e Sousa (1863–1933)	17 January 1919	27 July 1919	191 days	Independent	Delfim Moreira (Minas Republican Party)
103	Homero Batista	Homero Batista (1861–1924)	27 July 1919	15 November 1922	3 years, 111 days	PRR	Epitácio Pessoa (Minas Republican Party)
104	Rafael Vidal	Rafael Vidal (1870–1941)	15 November 1922	2 January 1925	2 years, 48 days	Republican Party of São Paulo	Artur Bernardes (Minas Republican Party)
105	Aníbal Freire da Fonseca	Aníbal Freire da Fonseca (1884–1970)	2 January 1925	15 November 1926	1 year, 317 days	PRF	Artur Bernardes (Minas Republican Party)
106	Getúlio Vargas	Getúlio Vargas (1882–1954)	15 November 1926	17 December 1927	1 year, 32 days	PRR	Washington Luís (Republican Party of São Paulo)
107	Oliveira Botelho	Oliveira Botelho (1868–1943)	17 December 1927	24 October 1930	2 years, 311 days	PRF	Washington Luís (Republican Party of São Paulo)
108	Agenor Lafayette de Roure	Agenor Lafayette de Roure (1870–1935)	24 October 1930	4 November 1930	11 days	Independent	Military Junta of 1930 (Military junta)
109	José Maria Whitaker	José Maria Whitaker (1878–1970)	4 November 1930	16 November 1931	1 year, 12 days	Independent	Getúlio Vargas (Ind)
110	Oswaldo Aranha	Oswaldo Aranha (1894–1960)	16 November 1931	24 July 1934	2 years, 250 days	PRR	Getúlio Vargas (Ind)
111	Artur de Sousa Costa	Artur de Sousa Costa (1893–1957)	24 July 1934	10 November 1937	3 years, 109 days	Independent	Getúlio Vargas (Ind)

=== Estado Novo (Third Brazilian Republic) ===
No.	Portrait	Minister	Took office	Left office	Time in office	President
111	Artur de Sousa Costa	Artur de Sousa Costa (1893–1957)	10 November 1937	25 January 1939	1 year, 76 days	Getúlio Vargas
–	Romero Pessoa	Romero Pessoa (1892–1982); Acting	25 January 1939	18 March 1941	2 years, 52 days	Getúlio Vargas
112	Artur de Sousa Costa	Artur de Sousa Costa (1893–1957)	18 March 1941	23 June 1944	3 years, 97 days	Getúlio Vargas
–	Paulo de Lira Tavares	Paulo de Lira Tavares (1901–1959); Acting	23 June 1944	11 August 1944	49 days	Getúlio Vargas
113	Artur de Sousa Costa	Artur de Sousa Costa (1893–1957)	11 August 1944	29 October 1945	1 year, 79 days	Getúlio Vargas
114	José Pires do Rio	José Pires do Rio (1880–1950)	29 October 1945	1 February 1946	95 days	José Linhares

=== Fourth Brazilian Republic ===
No.	Portrait	Minister	Took office	Left office	Time in office	Party	President
115	Gastão Vidigal	Gastão Vidigal (1889–1950)	1 February 1946	15 October 1946	256 days	Independent	Eurico Gaspar Dutra (PSD)
–	Onaldo Brancante Machado	Onaldo Brancante Machado (1893–1963); Acting	15 October 1946	21 October 1946	6 days	Independent	Eurico Gaspar Dutra (PSD)
116	Pedro Luís Correia de Castro	Pedro Luís Correia de Castro (1881–1953)	21 October 1946	10 June 1949	2 years, 232 days	Independent	Eurico Gaspar Dutra (PSD)
117	Manuel Guilherme da Silveira Filho	Manuel Guilherme da Silveira Filho (1882–1974)	10 June 1949	31 January 1951	1 year, 235 days	Independent	Eurico Gaspar Dutra (PSD)
118	Horácio Lafer	Horácio Lafer (1900–1965)	31 January 1951	15 June 1953	2 years, 135 days	PSD	Getúlio Vargas (PTB)
119	Oswaldo Aranha	Oswaldo Aranha (1894–1960)	15 June 1953	24 August 1954	1 year, 70 days	Independent	Getúlio Vargas (PTB)
120	Eugênio Gudin	Eugênio Gudin (1886–1986)	24 August 1954	12 April 1955	231 days	Independent	Café Filho (PSP)
121	José Maria Whitaker	José Maria Whitaker (1878–1970)	12 April 1955	10 October 1955	181 days	Independent	Café Filho (PSP)
122	Mário Leopoldo Pereira da Câmara	Mário Leopoldo Pereira da Câmara (1891–1967)	10 October 1955	31 January 1956	113 days	Independent	Café Filho (PSP); Carlos Luz (PSD); Nereu Ramos (PSD)
123	José Maria Alkmin	José Maria Alkmin (1901–1974)	31 January 1956	24 June 1958	2 years, 144 days	PSD	Juscelino Kubitschek (PSD)
124	Lucas Lopes	Lucas Lopes (1911–1994)	24 June 1958	28 November 1958	157 days	Independent	Juscelino Kubitschek (PSD)
125	Sebastião Paes de Almeida	Sebastião Paes de Almeida (1912–1975)	28 November 1958	31 January 1961	2 years, 64 days	PSD	Juscelino Kubitschek (PSD)
126	Clemente Mariani	Clemente Mariani (1900–1981)	31 January 1961	7 September 1961	219 days	UDN	Jânio Quadros (PTN); Ranieri Mazzilli (PSD)

No.	Portrait	Minister	Took office	Left office	Time in office	Party	Prime Minister
127	Walter Moreira Salles	Walter Moreira Salles (1912–2001)	7 September 1961	3 August 1962	330 days	Independent	Tancredo Neves (PSD); Brochado da Rocha (PSD)
128	Miguel Calmon du Pin e Almeida Sobrinho	Miguel Calmon du Pin e Almeida Sobrinho (1912–1967)	3 August 1962	24 January 1963	174 days	PSD	Brochado da Rocha (PSD); Hermes Lima (PTB)

No.	Portrait	Minister	Took office	Left office	Time in office	Party	President
129	San Tiago Dantas	San Tiago Dantas (1911–1964)	24 January 1963	20 June 1963	147 days	PTB	João Goulart (PTB)
130	Carvalho Pinto	Carvalho Pinto (1910–1987)	20 June 1963	20 December 1963	183 days	PDC	João Goulart (PTB)
131	Ney Neves Galvão	Ney Neves Galvão (1902–1990)	20 December 1963	3 April 1964	105 days	Independent	João Goulart (PTB)

=== Military Dictatorship (Fifth Brazilian Republic) ===
No.	Portrait	Minister	Took office	Left office	Time in office	Party	President
132	Otávio Gouveia de Bulhões	Otávio Gouveia de Bulhões (1906–1990)	3 April 1964	15 March 1967	2 years, 346 days	Independent	Ranieri Mazzilli (PSD); Castelo Branco (ARENA)
133	Antônio Delfim Netto	Antônio Delfim Netto (1928–2024)	15 March 1967	15 March 1974	7 years, 0 days	ARENA	Costa e Silva (ARENA); Military Junta of 1969 (Military junta); Emílio Garrastazu Médici (ARENA)
134	Mário Henrique Simonsen	Mário Henrique Simonsen (1935–1997)	15 March 1974	15 March 1979	5 years, 0 days	Independent	Ernesto Geisel (ARENA)
135	Ernane Galvêas	Ernane Galvêas (1922–2022)	15 March 1979	15 March 1985	6 years, 0 days	Independent	João Figueiredo (PDS)

=== Sixth Brazilian Republic ===
No.	Portrait	Minister	Took office	Left office	Time in office	Party	President
136	Francisco Dornelles	Francisco Dornelles (1935–2023)	15 March 1985	26 August 1985	164 days	MDB	José Sarney (MDB)
137	Dilson Funaro	Dilson Funaro (1933–1989)	26 August 1985	29 April 1987	1 year, 246 days	Independent	José Sarney (MDB)
138	Luiz Carlos Bresser-Pereira	Luiz Carlos Bresser-Pereira (born 1934)	29 April 1987	21 December 1987	236 days	Independent	José Sarney (MDB)
139	Maílson da Nóbrega	Maílson da Nóbrega (born 1942)	6 January 1988	15 March 1990	2 years, 68 days	Independent	José Sarney (MDB)
140	Zélia Cardoso de Mello	Zélia Cardoso de Mello (born 1953)	15 March 1990	10 May 1991	1 year, 56 days	Independent	Fernando Collor (PRN)
141	Marcílio Marques Moreira	Marcílio Marques Moreira (born 1931)	10 May 1991	2 October 1992	1 year, 145 days	Independent	Fernando Collor (PRN)
142	Gustavo Krause	Gustavo Krause (born 1946)	2 October 1992	16 December 1992	75 days	PFL	Itamar Franco (MDB)
143	Paulo Roberto Haddad	Paulo Roberto Haddad (born 1939)	16 December 1992	1 March 1993	75 days	Independent	Itamar Franco (MDB)
144	Eliseu Resende	Eliseu Resende (1929–2011)	1 March 1993	19 May 1993	79 days	PFL	Itamar Franco (MDB)
145	Fernando Henrique Cardoso	Fernando Henrique Cardoso (born 1931)	19 May 1993	30 March 1994	315 days	PSDB	Itamar Franco (MDB)
146	Rubens Ricupero	Rubens Ricupero (born 1937)	30 March 1994	6 September 1994	160 days	Independent	Itamar Franco (MDB)
147	Ciro Gomes	Ciro Gomes (born 1957)	6 September 1994	1 January 1995	117 days	PSDB	Itamar Franco (MDB)
148	Pedro Malan	Pedro Malan (born 1943)	1 January 1995	1 January 2003	8 years, 0 days	Independent	Fernando Henrique Cardoso (PSDB)
149	Antonio Palocci	Antonio Palocci (born 1960)	1 January 2003	27 March 2006	3 years, 85 days	PT	Luiz Inácio Lula da Silva (PT)
150	Guido Mantega	Guido Mantega (born 1949)	27 March 2006	1 January 2015	8 years, 280 days	PT	Luiz Inácio Lula da Silva (PT); Dilma Rousseff (PT)
151	Joaquim Levy	Joaquim Levy (born 1961)	1 January 2015	18 December 2015	351 days	Independent	Dilma Rousseff (PT)
152	Nelson Barbosa	Nelson Barbosa (born 1969)	18 December 2015	12 May 2016	146 days	Independent	Dilma Rousseff (PT)
153	Henrique Meirelles	Henrique Meirelles (born 1945)	12 May 2016	6 April 2018	1 year, 329 days	MDB	Michel Temer (MDB)
154	Eduardo Guardia	Eduardo Guardia (1966–2022)	6 April 2018	1 January 2019	270 days	Independent	Michel Temer (MDB)
155	Paulo Guedes	Paulo Guedes (born 1949)	1 January 2019	1 January 2023	4 years, 0 days	Independent	Jair Bolsonaro (PL)
156	Fernando Haddad	Fernando Haddad (born 1963)	1 January 2023	20 March 2026	3 years, 78 days	PT	Luiz Inácio Lula da Silva (PT)
157	Dario Durigan	Dario Durigan (born 1984)	20 March 2026	Incumbent	199 days	Independent	Luiz Inácio Lula da Silva (PT)
