= Gabriel Galípolo =

Brazilian economist (born 1982)

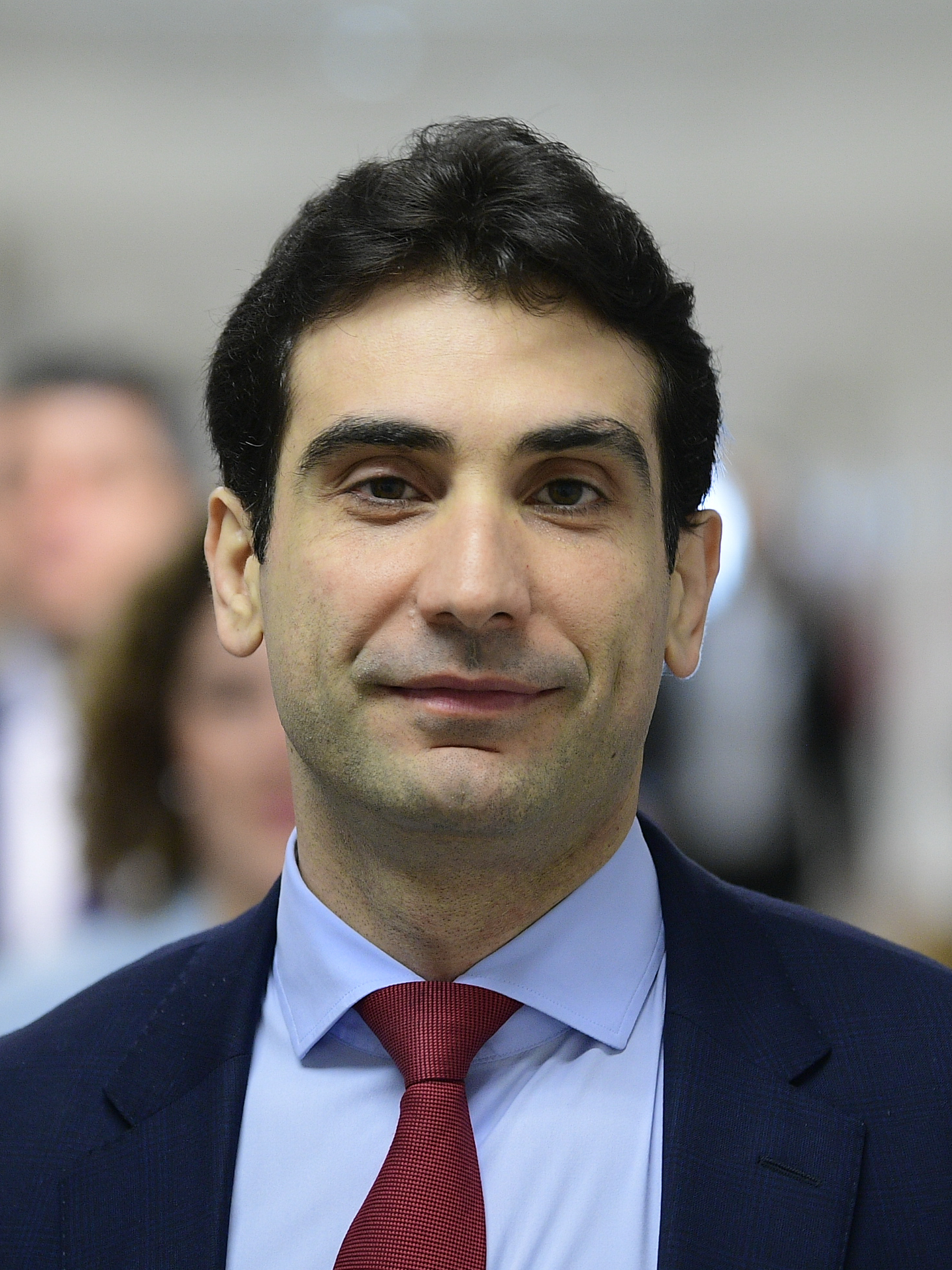
- Galípolo in 2023

President of the Central Bank of Brazil
- Incumbent
- Assumed office 1 January 2025
- Nominated by: Luiz Inácio Lula da Silva
- Preceded by: Roberto Campos Neto

Director of Monetary Policy of the Central Bank of Brazil
- In office 12 July 2023 – 31 December 2024
- Nominated by: Luiz Inácio Lula da Silva
- Preceded by: Bruno Serra Fernandes
- Succeeded by: Nilton Schneider

Executive-Secretary of the Ministry of Finance
- In office 1 January 2023 – 20 June 2023
- Minister: Fernando Haddad
- Preceded by: Marcelo Guaranys
- Succeeded by: Dario Durigan

Chairman of Banco do Brasil
- In office 12 May 2023 – 3 July 2023
- Appointed by: Fernando Haddad
- Preceded by: Iêda Cagni
- Succeeded by: Anelize Lenzi

Personal details
- Born: Gabriel Muricca Galípolo; 14 April 1982 (age 44) São Paulo, Brazil
- Education: Pontifical Catholic University of São Paulo (BEc)

Gabriel Muricca Galípolo (born 14 April 1982) is a Brazilian economist, ex-banker, writer and university professor, currently serving as the president of the Central Bank of Brazil. He had served as director of monetary policy of the Central Bank of Brazil, executive-secretary of the Ministry of Finance from 1 January to 20 June 2023 and chairman of Banco do Brasil from May to June 2023.

Galípolo is Bachelor of Economic Sciences and Master of Political Economy at the Pontifical Catholic University of São Paulo (PUC-SP) and had served as CEO of Banco Fator from 2017 to 2021. On 13 December 2022, during the presidential transition of president-elect Luiz Inácio Lula da Silva, he was announced as executive-secretary of the Finance Ministry, under minister Fernando Haddad. On 12 July 2023, Galípolo was sworn in as Director of Monetary Policy of the Central Bank.

On 28 August 2024, president Lula da Silva appointed Galípolo to succeed Roberto Campos Neto as President of the Central Bank. The announcement was made by Finance Minister, Fernando Haddad. His appointment was sent for a hearing in the Federal Senate, held on 8 October 2024. His nomination was approved by the Senate in a voting of 66–5. His term as president runs from 2025 to 2028.

== Early life and education ==
Galípolo was born on 14 April 1982 in São Paulo, son to Vera and Eduardo Galípolo and has a brother, Diego. He holds a bachelor's degree in economics at the Pontifical Catholic University of São Paulo. He also holds a master's degree at the same institution, where he also taught. Under the orientation of João Machado Borges Neto, Galípolo defended his master's degree thesis in 2008, named The Law of Value as limit to the development of the Brazilian economy.

== Career ==
In 2007, he began his public life career as Head of Economic Advisors of the São Paulo State Secretariat of Metropolitan Transportation during the governorship of José Serra. The following year, he took office as director of the State Secretary of Economy and Planning of São Paulo, current Secretariat of Finance and Planning.

He was CEO of Banco Fator from 2017 to 2021 and university professor at PUC-SP. Galípolo taught the MBA of public-private partnerships and concessions at the São Paulo School Foundation of Sociology and Politics (FESPSP) and is senior researcher of the Brazilian Center of Foreign Affairs.

Galípolo is co-author of books "Manda quem pode, obedece quem tem prejuízo", "A escassez na abundância capitalista" and "Dinheiro: o poder da abstração real", in partnership with Luiz Gonzaga Belluzzo.

=== Ministry of Finance ===
On 13 December 2022, Fernando Haddad, nominated to head the Ministry of Finance by then-president-elect Lula da Silva, announced Galípolo as his executive-secretary. In May 2023, Galípolo was elected chairman of Banco do Brasil, office he served until July. On 20 June 2023, he was dismissed from office, succeeded by former director of WhatsApp in Brazil, attorney Dario Durigan.

=== Central Bank of Brazil ===
On 8 May 2023, Galípolo was announced as Director of Monetary Policy of the Central Bank, vacant since the dismissal of Bruno Serra Fernandes on 28 February 2023. According to minister Fernando Haddad, Galípolo's nomination was suggested by the president of the Central Bank, Roberto Campos Neto. His hearing was held at the Economic Affairs Commission of the Federal Senate on 4 July 2023 and his nomination passed in a voting of 39–12 on the same day. The approval was published on Diário Oficial da União on 7 July and he was sworn in on 12 July.

== Awards ==
- Commander of the Order of Rio Branco (21 November 2023)

Business positions
| Preceded by Iêda Cagni | Chairman of Banco do Brasil; 2023 | Succeeded by Anelize Lenzi |
Political offices
| Preceded by Marcelo Guaranys | Executive-Secretary of the Ministry of Finance; 2023 | Succeeded by Dario Durigan |
Government offices
| Preceded by Bruno Serra Fernandes | Director of Monetary Policy of the Central Bank of Brazil; 2023–2024 | Succeeded by Nilton Schneider |
| Preceded by Roberto Campos Neto | President of the Central Bank of Brazil; 2025–present | Incumbent |
Order of precedence
| Preceded by Andrei Rodrigues as Director General of the Federal Police of Brazil | Brazilian order of precedence 51st in line as President of the Central Bank of Brazil | Followed by Tarciana Medeiros as Chairwoman of Bank of Brazil |
