= Antônio Luís Pereira da Cunha, Marquis of Inhambupe =

Brazilian politician

Marquis of Inhambupe
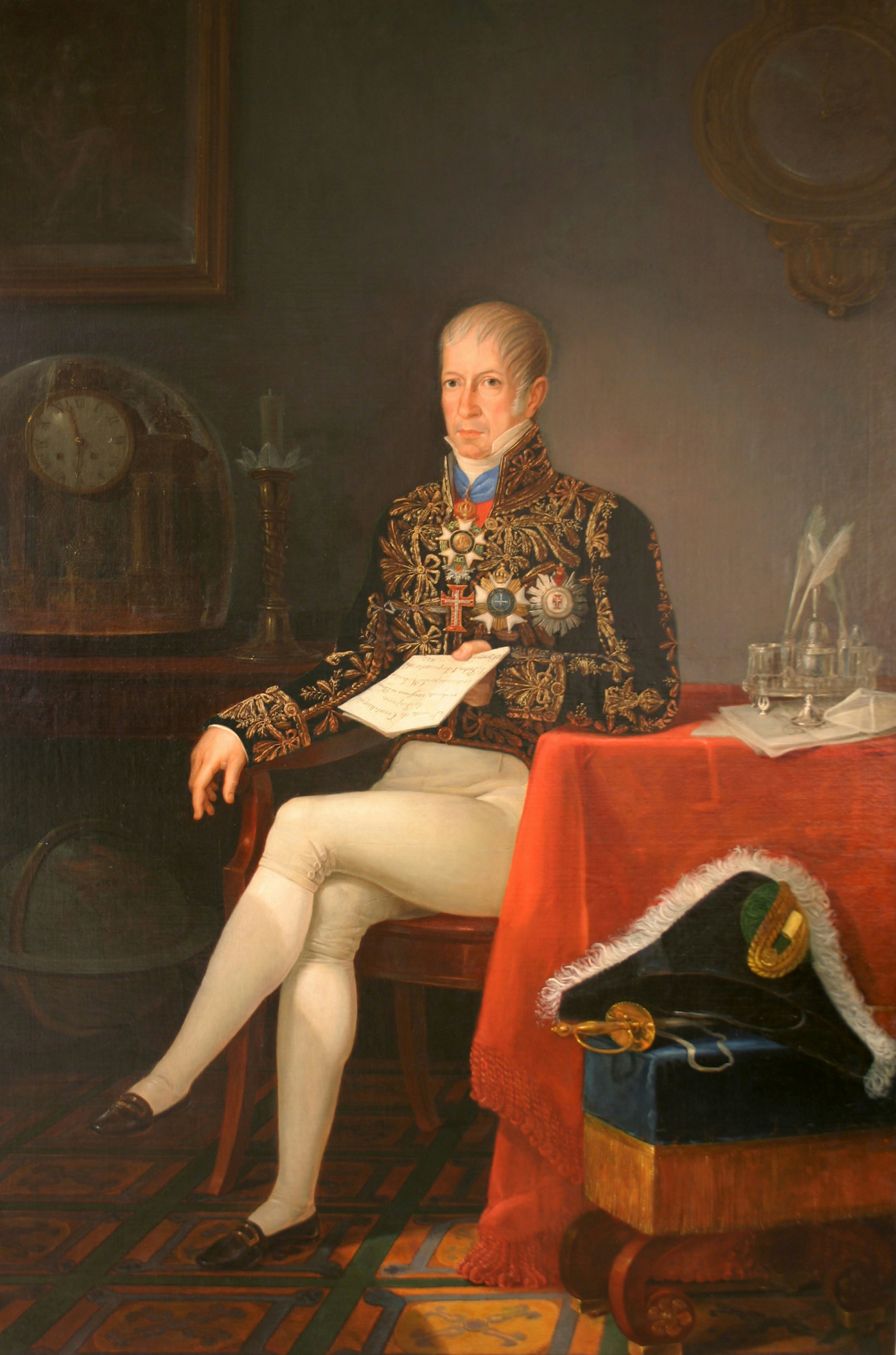
- Portrait by Simplício Rodrigues de Sá, 1825

Minister of Finance
- In office 20 January 1826 – 21 January 1826
- Monarch: Pedro I
- Preceded by: Felisberto Caldeira Brant
- Succeeded by: Nogueira da Gama

Personal details
- Born: 6 April 1760 Salvador, Bahia, State of Brazil
- Died: 19 November 1837 (aged 77) Rio de Janeiro, Empire of Brazil

Antônio Luís Pereira da Cunha, Marquis of Inhambupe (6 April 1760 – 19 September 1837), was a Brazilian magistrate (juiz de fora), appellate judge (desembargador) and politician.

== Biography ==
His father was Bartolomeu Pereira da Silva; his mother, Ana da Cunha Barbosa. His first wife was Isabel Joaquina de Assis; around 1789, he married Erculana Felizarda Figueira (died 1796); after her death, on December 13, 1801, in Lisbon, he married Maria Joaquina Gerleu da Rocha Dantas e Mendonça (1785–1861), with whom he had three children: Lourenço de Assis, Manoel Luiz and Marianna. He was the brother of Pedro Augusto Nolasco Pereira da Cunha. After completing studies in mathematics and philosophy, he went to Portugal to enroll at the Universidade de Coimbra on 20 December 1782. He graduated in law on 4 May 1787, and then became a magistrate. In 1789, he served as a juiz de fora in Torres Vedras (1789). Returning to Brazil, he was an ouvidor (a type of magistrate) in Bahia and an appellate judge (desembargador) in Pernambuco in 1792. In 1798, he was a member of the interim government of Pernambuco, together with the Bishop of Olinda, Azeredo Coutinho, and the Intendant of the Navy, Pedro Severim, after the governor, D. Tomás José de Melo, was dismissed by royal charter of 20 August 1798.

In 1802, he was appointed ouvidor in Rio das Velhas, Minas Gerais. In 1803, he took office as ouvidor of Sabará, Minas Gerais, and in 1806 he was appointed Chancellor of the tribunal da relação (appellate court) of Bahia. In 1805, he was appointed judge and desembargador of the Casa da Suplicação (supreme court) in Lisbon, Portugal. In 1809 he was part of the interim government of Bahia, in a triumvirate with José de Santa Escolástica Álvares Pereira and João Baptista Vieira Godinho. In 1818, he was a deputy of the Board of Commerce, Agriculture, Manufacturing and Navigation (Junta do Comércio, Agricultura, Fábricas e Navegação).

In 1823, he was finance minister. He was Senator for Pernambuco, in the Empire of Brazil, from 1826 to 1837. At the time of his death, he was President of the Senate.

He received the titles of viscount and grandee by imperial decree of 12 October 1825, and that of marquis, by imperial decree of 12 October 1826. He was also appointed: in 1808, councillor of the Treasury (conselheiro da Fazenda); in 1809, as a Fidalgo Knight of the Imperial House (1809); as a dignitary of the Order of the Southern Cross; and in 1824, a Councillor of State (1st Council).

He was one of the negotiators on the Brazilian side for the British-Brazilian Treaty of 1826.

== Awards ==
- (Portugal) Knight of the Imperial Order of Christ, in 1802
- (Brazil) Knight of the Imperial Order of Christ, in 1811
- (Brazil) Dignitary of the Imperial Order of the Southern Cross, in 1824
