= Tomás José de Melo =

Portuguese nobleman, naval officer and colonial administrator (1742–1805)

His Lordship Tomás José de Melo
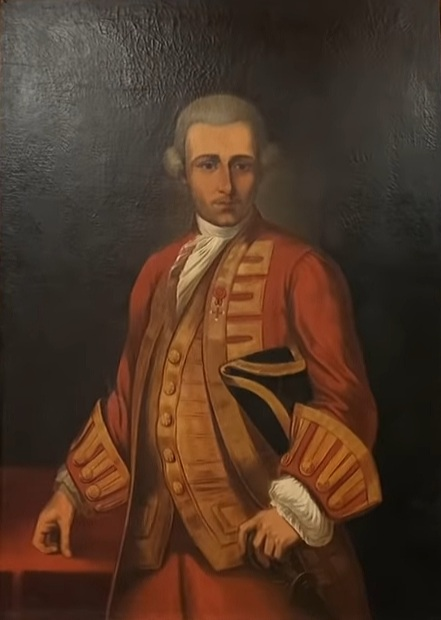

Governor of Pernambuco
- In office 11 December 1787 – 29 December 1798
- Monarch: Maria I
- Preceded by: José César de Meneses
- Succeeded by: 2nd Government junta

Personal details
- Born: 20 September 1742 Lisbon, Portugal
- Died: 15 August 1805 (aged 62) Lisbon, Portugal
- Children: D. Mariana Joaquina Rosa do Carmo; D. António José de Melo
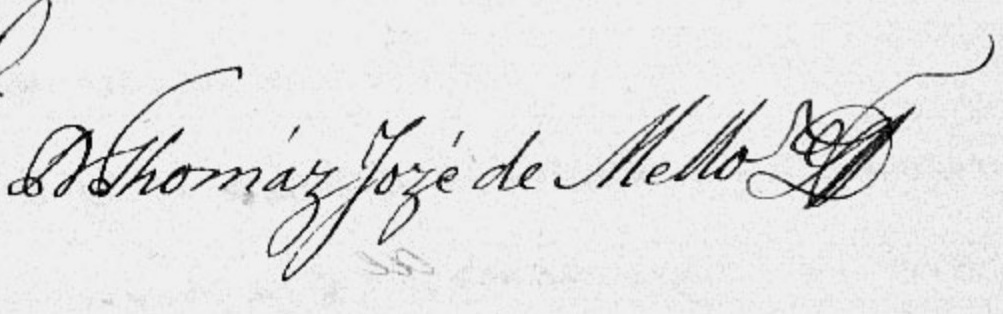
- Signature

Military service
- Allegiance: (Kingdom of Portugal) Portugal
- Branch/service: Portuguese Navy
- Years of service: 1755–180?
- Rank: Vice admiral
- Battles/wars: Spanish–Algerian War; Bombardment of Algiers

D. Tomás José de Melo (20 September 1742 – 15 August 1805) was a Portuguese nobleman, naval officer and colonial administrator, who served as Governor of Pernambuco from 1787 to 1798. A descendant of the Marquises of Alegrete, D. Tomás de Melo reached the rank of vice admiral in the Portuguese Navy, participating in the Bombardment of Algiers in 1784. He was also a member of the Order of Malta.

== Early life and military career ==
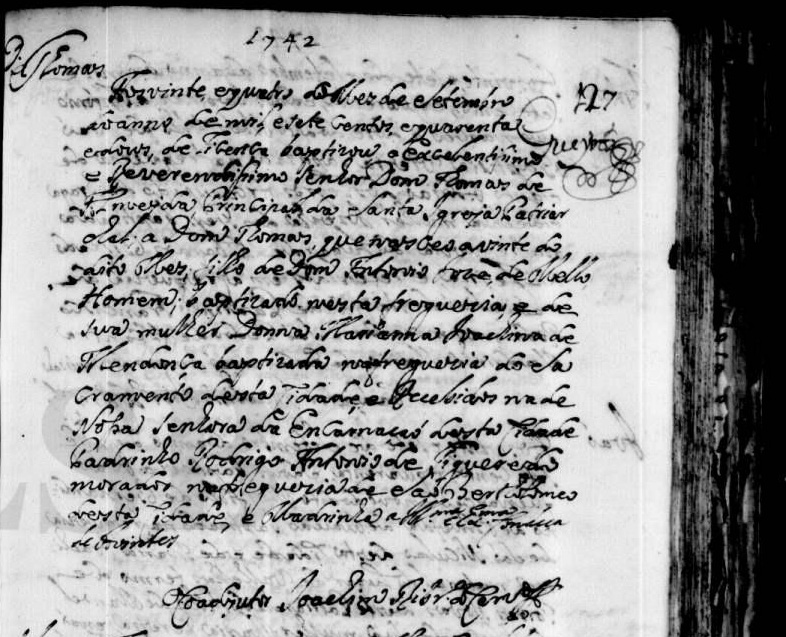
Baptismal register of D. Tomás de Melo

Tomás José de Melo was born in Lisbon on 20 September 1742 to D. António José de Melo and his wife D. Mariana Joaquina de Mendonça, and was baptized four days later, on 24 September, in the parish of Mercês. He belonged to the high Portuguese nobility, being a descendant of the Marquises of Alegrete.

He began his military career enlisting as a soldier at the age of 14, in 1755. He joined the Order of Malta in 1760, and in 1761, he was promoted to guarda-marinha, being the first of his class. In the same year, he was nominated capitão-tenente, function who exerted for twenty years, seven of them in India. In 1780, he was promoted to capitão de mar e guerra and participated in the attack on Algiers, captaining the frigate Golfinho. In 1784, he was elevated to the function of coronel do mar.

== Governor of Pernambuco and later life ==
On 11 August 1786, he was nominated governor and captain general of Pernambuco, of which he took office on 11 December 1787. Ten years later, received his last mercy: he was graced by the regent D. João, with the post of graduated chefe de esquadra. His trajectory in the captaincy was long, just like its predecessor: he was responsible for the administration of the captaincy from 11 December 1787 until 29 December 1798, when he was removed from the government.

D. Tomás de Melo needed to deal with the growth of cotton cultivation, which dismantled the supply of staple foods in the captaincy, and faced a period of three years of severe drought, reducing the production of flour. After the drought, the cultivation of cotton to the profitable external market also did not contribute to the production of food to the population: it was better and easier to sell cotton to Europe than cultivate flour. Thus, the production of cotton duplicated in six years: from 9,000 sacks exported in 1792 to 18,000 in 1798. He also had to deal with constant incursions of French ships on the northeastern coast, which made him reinstall forced recruitment.

In 1798, his government was denounced two times to the Overseas Council. One of the denunciations was made by António de Deus da Paz, a solicitor and accountant, and the other was made by Jerónimo José Gomes, a judge. The governor was accused of nepotism, smuggling, fraud, and selling military ranks. He was dismissed by royal charter of 20 August 1798, and on 29 December 1798, he handed over the government to a junta, composed by the Bishop of Olinda, D. José Joaquim da Cunha de Azeredo Coutinho, chefe de esquadra Pedro Severim, Intendant of the Navy, and desembargador António Luís Pereira da Cunha, ouvidor-geral of the comarca. He was arrested together with his servant, Domingos José Fidélis, and they were sent to Bahia. He was eventually released from prison, acquitted, and returned to Portugal, while Domingos José Fidélis was sent to Lisbon.

He was promoted to vice admiral on 29 October 1801 and died in Lisbon on 15 August 1805.

During his term as governor, Tomás had a mistress, D. Brites. He did not get married, but he had two children in Pernambuco: D. Mariana Joaquina Rosa do Carmo and D. António José de Melo (1798–1863). Both were legitimised by Queen Maria I, the first on 19 July 1794 and the latter on 2 April 1801.

Pernambuco historian Francisco Augusto Pereira da Costa considered him an "active man, of great orientation, with an entrepreneurial, energetic, and hardworking spirit", and calls him "undoubtedly one of the good governors of colonial times".
