= Oswaldo Aranha =

Brazilian diplomat and politician (1894–1960)

His Excellency Oswaldo Aranha
- Aranha in 1940

President of the United Nations General Assembly
- In office 28 April 1947 – 20 September 1948
- Secretary-General: Trygve Lie
- Preceded by: Paul-Henri Spaak
- Succeeded by: José Arce

Minister of Foreign Affairs
- In office 15 March 1938 – 23 August 1944
- President: Getúlio Vargas
- Preceded by: Pimentel Brandão
- Succeeded by: Pedro Leão Veloso
Further offices held
Minister of Finance
In office 16 June 1953 – 24 August 1954
President	Getúlio Vargas
Preceded by	Horácio Lafer
Succeeded by	Eugênio Gudin
In office 16 November 1931 – 24 July 1934
President	Getúlio Vargas
Preceded by	José Maria Whitaker
Succeeded by	Artur de Sousa Costa
Minister of Agriculture
In office 8 June 1954 – 28 June 1954
President	Getúlio Vargas
Preceded by	João Cleofas
Succeeded by	Apolônio Sales
Brazilian Ambassador to the United States
In office 18 October 1934 – 11 December 1937
Nominated by	Getúlio Vargas
Preceded by	Rinaldo de Lima e Silva
Succeeded by	Pimentel Brandão
Minister of Justice and Internal Affairs
In office 3 November 1930 – 21 December 1931
President	Getúlio Vargas
Preceded by	Afrânio de Melo Franco
Succeeded by	Maurício Cardoso
Governor of Rio Grande do Sul
In office 9 October 1930 – 26 October 1930
Nominated by	Getúlio Vargas
Preceded by	Getúlio Vargas
Succeeded by	Sinval Saldanha
Secretary of the Interior and Exterior of Rio Grande do Sul
In office 25 January 1928 – 12 October 1930
Governor	Getúlio Vargas
Preceded by	João Pio de Almeida
Succeeded by	João Simplício Carvalho
Member of the Chamber of Deputies
In office 26 May 1927 – 25 January 1928
Constituency	Rio Grande do Sul

Personal details
- Born: 15 February 1894 Alegrete, Brazil
- Died: 27 January 1960 (aged 65) Rio de Janeiro, Brazil
- Party: PRR
- Spouse: Delminda Gudolle (m. 1917)
- Children: 4
- Education: Federal University of Rio de Janeiro
- Oswaldo Aranha's voice Speech by Oswaldo Aranha announcing the severance of Brazil's diplomatic relations with the Axis powers (recorded 1942)

Oswaldo Euclides de Souza Aranha (Portuguese pronunciation: [ozˈvawdu aˈɾɐ̃ɲɐ], 15 February 1894 – 27 January 1960) was a Brazilian politician, diplomat and statesman, who came to national prominence in 1930 under Getúlio Vargas.

He is known in international politics for lobbying for the creation of the State of Israel as head of the Brazilian delegation to the UN and President of the UN General Assembly in 1947. As head of the Brazilian delegation, he was President of the United Nations General Assembly in 1947 during the UNGA 181 vote on the United Nations Partition Plan for Palestine, in which he postponed the vote for three days to ensure its passage. For his efforts on Palestine, he was nominated for the Nobel Peace Prize in 1948.

== Early life and career up to 1942 ==
Oswaldo Aranha was born in the city of Alegrete in the state of Rio Grande do Sul. Aranha obtained his bachelor's degree in Law and Social Sciences at the Law School of the now-called Federal University of Rio de Janeiro in 1916. After his graduation, he returned to Rio Grande do Sul and practiced as a lawyer for eight years, establishing a personal and professional contact with Getúlio Vargas, who also was a lawyer. His first public office was that of Assistant Police Commissioner in his native state.

Aranha fought the insurrection of 1923, deflagrated by sectors that opposed the fifth consecutive re-election of Borges de Medeiros as governor of Rio Grande do Sul. By personally commanding an irregular armed force consisting of civilians, Aranha fought new uprisings promoted by the opposition in the years that led to the Revolution of 1930.

In a speedy political career, Oswaldo Aranha ran for his first elective office in 1926 and was elected Mayor of Alegrete, but soon became a member of the state legislature and later elected to the National Congress in 1928.

When Vargas ran as opposition candidate for president of Brazil in 1930 and lost, Aranha joined the tenentes to convince Vargas to organize a revolt. When the revolt succeeded, Aranha took the first of several positions in the Cabinet of Brazil under now-President Vargas, heading the Ministry of Finance, the Ministry of Justice, and the Ministry of Foreign Affairs, among other positions.

Aranha also served as ambassador to the United States in 1934 where he gained recognition as a strong supporter of Pan-Americanism. In 1937 he returned to Brazil to head the Ministry of Foreign Affairs. Aranha played a large role in the 1942 Rio de Janeiro Conference of Ministers of Foreign Affairs.

== Support for the Allies in World War II ==
While serving as Minister of Foreign Affairs, Brazil took part in the first three consultative meetings of the Ministers of Foreign Affairs of the American Republics which defined Pan-American policy during the early stages of World War II and worked out the recommendation for the collective severance of diplomatic relations with the Axis Powers. During the 1942 Rio conference, he announced that Brazil had cut all diplomatic ties with Nazi Germany, thereby siding with the United States and the Allies. Eventually, most Central and South American states did the same with the exception of Argentina and Chile.

At the first Special Session of the UN General Assembly held in 1947, Oswaldo Aranha, the head of the Brazilian delegation, began a tradition that has remained in which the first speaker at the major international forum is always a Brazilian.

== Attitude toward Jews during WWII ==
A book by the historian Maria Luiza Tucci Carneiro argues that Aranha was aware of secret circulars asking that Jews be denied entry visas to Brazil and did little to change that. Jeffrey Lesser's Welcoming the Undesirables: Brazil and the Jewish Question questions that conclusion by showing that Jewish entry rose notably after the secret circulars were circulated, with the active collaboration of many Brazilian diplomats and businesspeople.

The circular asking for the denial of visas to Jews, however, was not written by Oswaldo Aranha, and it was not made during his term as Minister of Foreign Affairs for Brazil. Mário de Pimentel Brandão was responsible for signing the secret circular in 1937 during his term as Minister of Foreign Affairs of Brazil.

During Oswaldo Aranha's term as Minister of Foreign Affairs, from 1938 to 1944, many Jews were granted visas to Brazil despite the circulars. In 1939, Jews were granted 4,601 permanent and temporary resident visas to Brazil. That year, 9% of all permanent residency visas and 14% of temporary Brazilian visas were issued to people of Jewish origin. In 1940, 2,500 Jewish immigrants were given visas to Brazil.

Considered a moderate by many in and outside of Brazil, he argued that communism was the result of "the Judaism which created and maintains this ambience, capable of sending this civilization into an abyss".

Albert Einstein asked Oswaldo Aranha for help in obtaining a visa for his friend who was a German Jew, Helene Fabian-Katz. Einstein had previously appealed to the U.S. government for help, but it denied Fabian-Katz a visa. Fabian-Katz was granted a visa to Brazil and joined her brother, who already lived in São Paulo.

== Partition of Palestine vote (1947) ==
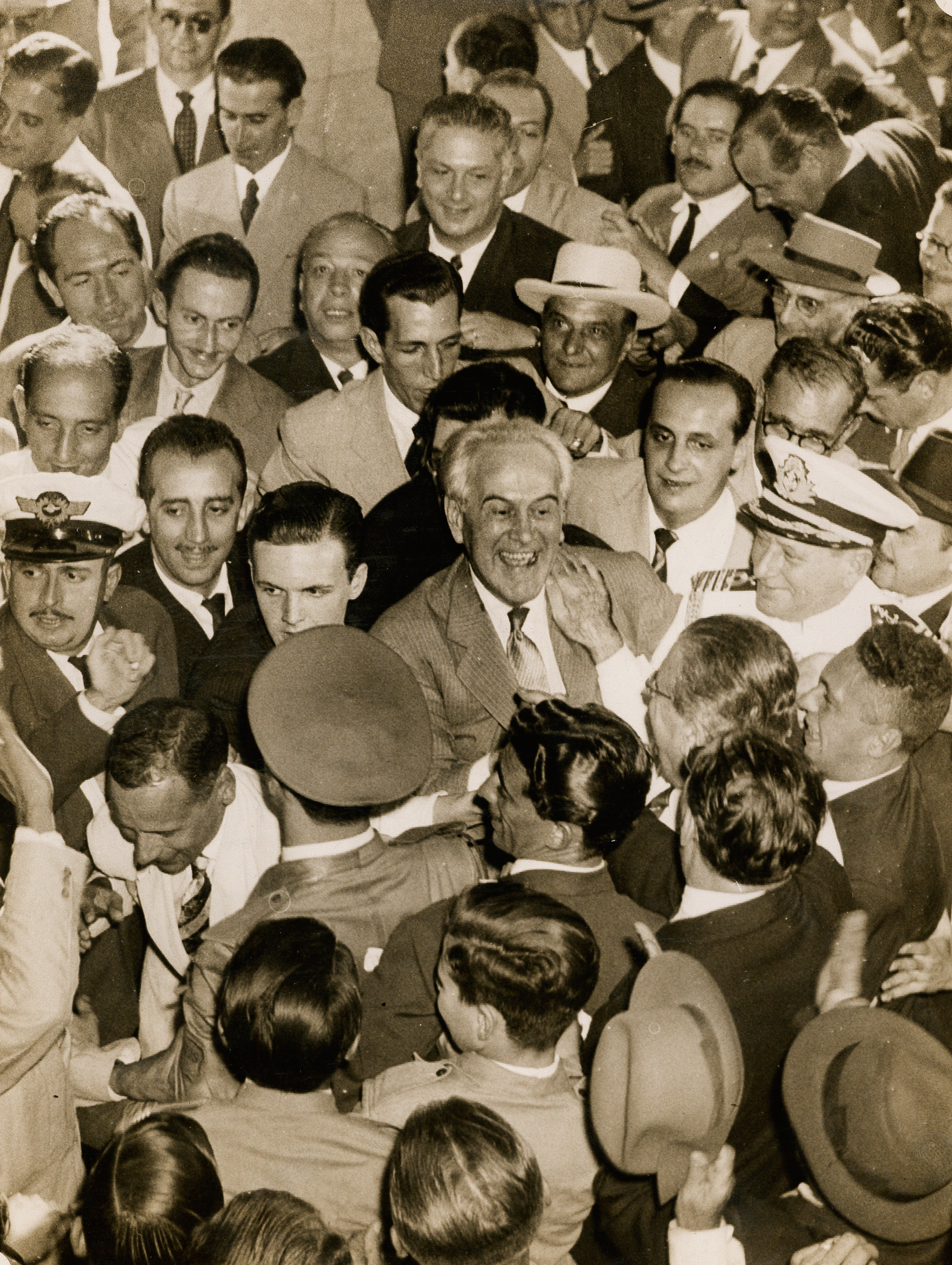
Oswaldo Aranha arriving from the United States to Rio de Janeiro, in 1947.

Aranha supported and heavily lobbied for the partition of Palestine toward the creation of the State of Israel. Streets in Israeli cities such as Beer-Sheva and Ramat Gan, and a square in Jerusalem are named after Aranha.

The photobiography of Oswaldo Aranha published by Pedro Corrêa do Lago in 2017 shows how Oswaldo Aranha, in his position as president of the United Nations General Assembly in 1947, was highly instrumental for the assembly's approval of the partition of Palestine insofar as he was able to postpone the voting by two days, as Corrêa do Lago explains: "[Aranha] was skillful and when he saw that the partition would not obtain 2/3 of the votes on time he got its allies to stretch their speeches to the max to prevent the vote from being taken that day. The decision was postponed [by Aranha] and as the next day was a holiday in the United States [Thanksgiving], this move bought the time needed to get the [additional] votes".

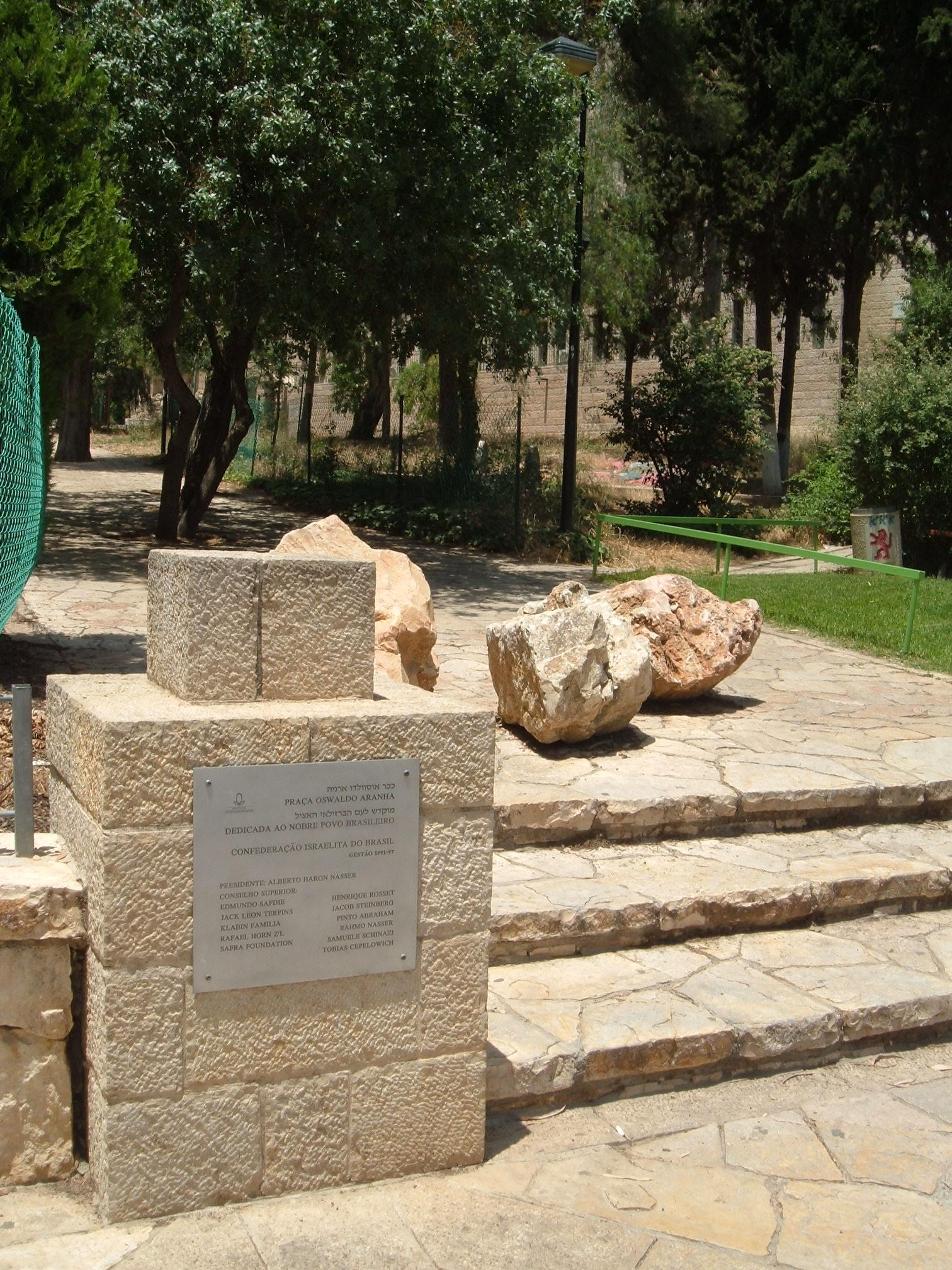
A plaque commemorating Aranha in Aranha Square, Jerusalem

In 2007, a street in Tel Aviv was named in his honor at a ceremony attended by his relatives and Brazil's ambassador to Israel.

== Footnotes and references ==
Diplomatic posts
Preceded by Rinaldo de Lima e Silva	Brazilian Ambassador to the United States; 1934–37	Succeeded by Mário de Pimentel Brandão
Political offices
Preceded by Getúlio Vargas	Governor of Rio Grande do Sul; 1930	Succeeded by Sinval Saldanha
Preceded by Afrânio de Melo Franco	Minister of Justice and Interior Affairs; 1930–31	Succeeded by Joaquim Maurício Cardoso
Preceded by José Maria Whitaker	Minister of Finance; 1931–34; 53–54	Succeeded by Artur de Sousa Costa
Preceded by Horácio Lafer	Minister of Finance; 1931–34; 53–54	Succeeded by Eugênio Gudin
Preceded by Mário de Pimentel Brandão	Minister of Foreign Affairs; 1938–44	Succeeded by Pedro Leão Veloso
Preceded by João Cleofas de Oliveira	Minister of Agriculture; 1954	Succeeded by Apolônio Jorge de Faria Sales
Positions in intergovernmental organisations
Preceded by Paul-Henri Spaak	President of the United Nations General Assembly; 1947–48	Succeeded by José Arce
