= Roberto Campos Neto =

Brazilian economist (born 1969)

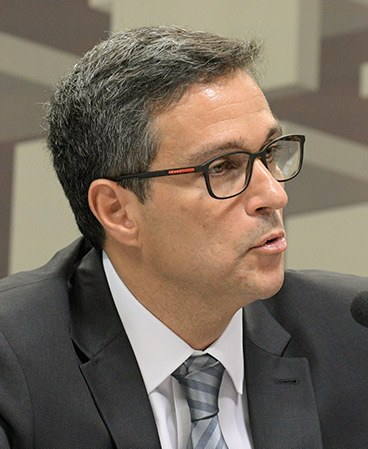
- Campos in 2019

President of the Central Bank of Brazil
- In office 28 February 2019 – 31 December 2024
- Nominated by: Jair Bolsonaro
- Preceded by: Ilan Goldfajn
- Succeeded by: Gabriel Galípolo

Personal details
- Born: Roberto de Oliveira Campos Neto; 28 June 1969 (age 57)
- Relatives: Roberto Campos (grandfather)
- Education: University of California, Los Angeles; California Institute of Technology
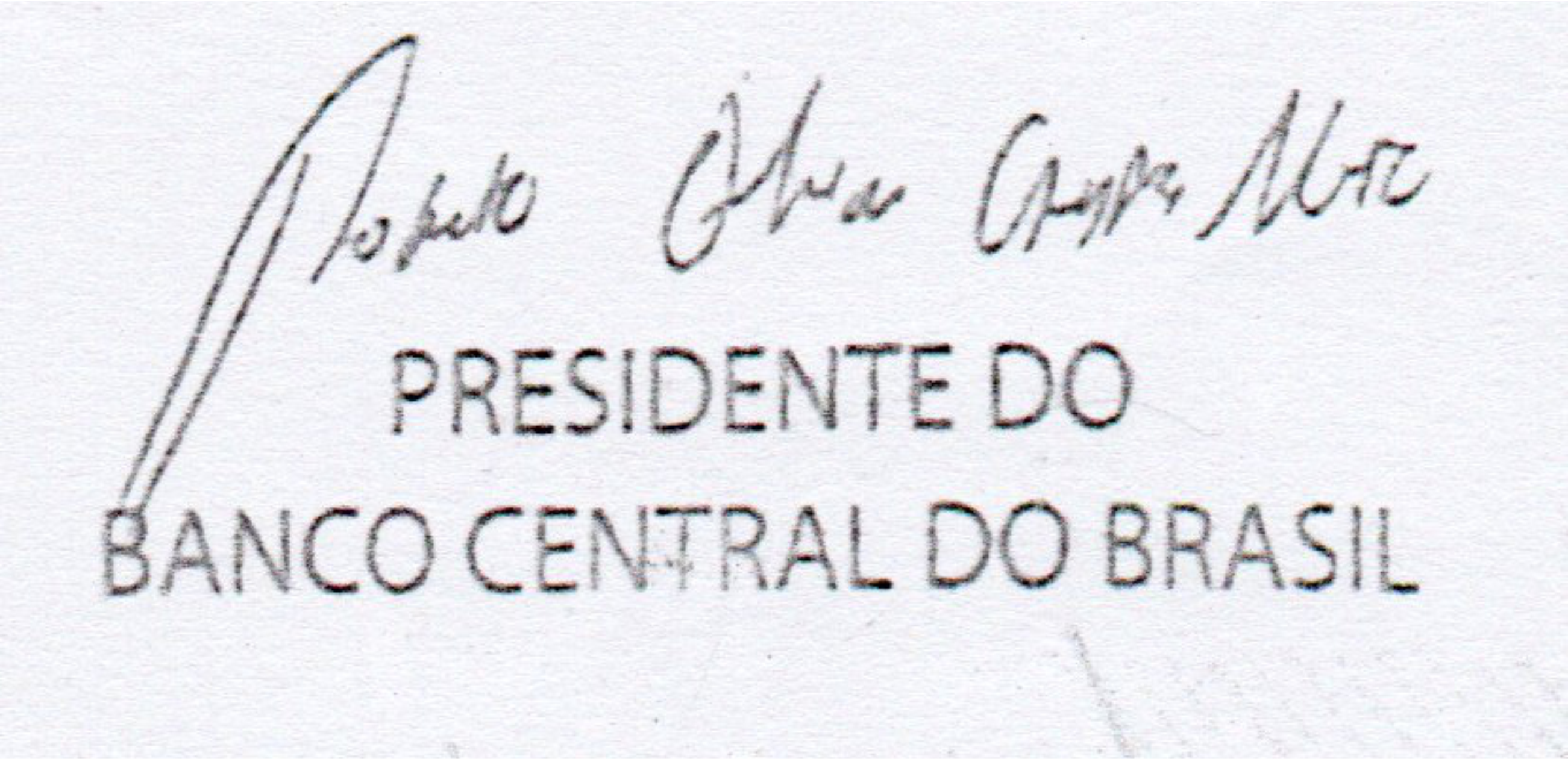
- Signature

Roberto de Oliveira Campos Neto (born 28 June 1969) is a Brazilian economist and former executive of Banco Santander. He served as the president of the Central Bank of Brazil until 31 December 2024. He is the grandson of Brazilian politician Roberto Campos, who was minister of planning during the Brazilian military dictatorship.

On 15 November 2018, Campos was announced as the future President of the Central Bank of Brazil in the administration of Jair Bolsonaro. As a Central Banker, Campos was featured in the Pandora Papers, a journalistic leak that exposed secret offshore accounts and he faced calls to resign.

== Early life and education ==
Campos was born in 1969. His grandfather Roberto de Oliveira Campos was a planning minister in the tenure of President Castelo Branco, and previously helped to create the Brazilian Development Bank.

Campos studied economics and finance at the University of California, Los Angeles (UCLA), from which he received a bachelor's degree. He holds two master's degrees, one in economics from UCLA and the other in applied mathematics from Caltech.

== Career ==
From 1996 to 1999, Campos worked at Banco Bozano Simonsen, and from 2000 to 2003, he headed Santander Brasil's department of international fixed income. In 2006 he was named the trading head of Santander, and in 2010 became the chief of treasury and regional and international markets of the bank. Campos is a close acquaintance of Paulo Guedes, the Economy minister. On 26 February 2019, Campos' appointment was approved by both Committee of Economic Affairs and the Federal Senate floor, with voting of 26–0 and 55–6, respectively.

In January 2021, Campos was elected as the "Central Bank President of the Year" by the British magazine The Banker. That same year, Campos was featured in the Pandora Papers, a journalistic leak that exposed the secret offshore accounts of people all over the world.

== Other activities ==
- Bank for International Settlements (BIS), Ex-Officio Member of the Board of Directors (since 2019)
- International Monetary Fund (IMF), Ex-Officio Alternate Member of the Board of Governors (since 2019)
- World Bank, Ex-Officio Alternate Member of the Board of Governors (since 2019)

Government offices
Preceded by Ilan Goldfajn	President of the Central Bank of Brazil; 2019-2024	Succeeded by Gabriel Galípolo
