= San Tiago Dantas =

Brazilian politician (1911–1964)

Minister of Finance
- In office 23 January 1963 – 20 June 1963
- President: João Goulart
- Preceded by: Miguel Calmon du Pin
- Succeeded by: Carvalho Pinto

Personal details
- Born: 30 August 1911 Rio de Janeiro, Federal District, Brazil
- Died: 6 September 1964 (aged 53) Rio de Janeiro, Guanabara, Brazil
- Party: PTB (until 1964)
- Occupation: Politician

Francisco Clementino San Tiago Dantas (30 August 1911 – 6 September 1964) was a journalist, lawyer, teacher and congressman, as well as Minister of Foreign Affairs during the presidency of João Goulart. He is considered one of the forerunners of the "Independent Foreign Policy", which sought to diversify Brazil's international relations and refused automatic alignments with any country or bloc. He was born and died in Rio de Janeiro.

== Biography ==
His concept of "Independent Foreign Policy" was based on the following objectives: total involvement in the Latin American Free Trade Association (LAFTA) and in the United Nations Conference on Trade and Development (UNCTAD), with the aim of protecting the price of commodities and participating in the growth of international trade; disarmament and more peaceful competitive coexistence, as well as international economic cooperation for the growth of underdeveloped nations. The basic concept was that, whilst respecting the international norms of good practice, Brazil should retain the right to negotiate with all countries, in accordance with its own conventions.

In 1943, San Tiago Dantas represented Brazil at the first Conference of Ministers of Education in the American Republics, in Panama. In 1951 he served as adviser to the Brazilian Delegation to the 4th Consultative Meeting of American Chief Ministers in Washington. In 1952 he became a member of the Permanent Arbitration Committee in The Hague. Between 1955 and 1958, he chaired the Inter-American Committee of Jurists, based in Rio de Janeiro. As head of the newspaper Jornal do Comércio from 1957 to 1958, he devoted his editorials - known as the "Várias" - to matters of foreign policy and in 1959 he assisted in the drafting and debating of the Santiago do Chile Declaration, one of the most important documents of the Inter-American System.
