= Rogério Ceron =

Brazilian economist

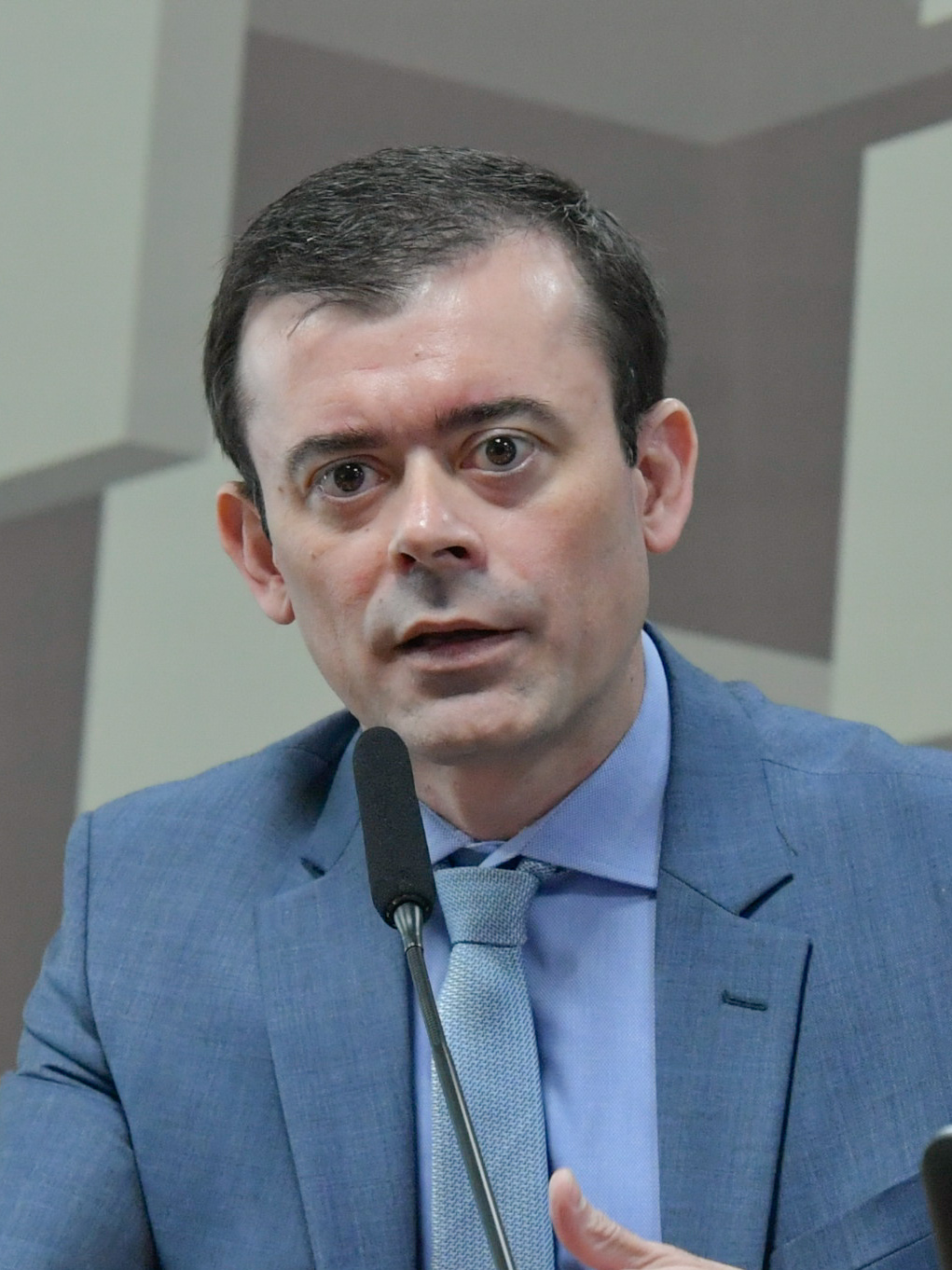
- Ceron in 2024

Executive Secretary of the Ministry of Finance
- Incumbent
- Assumed office 20 March 2026
- Minister: Dario Durigan
- Preceded by: Dario Durigan

Secretary of the National Treasury
- In office 1 January 2023 – 20 March 2026
- Minister: Fernando Haddad
- Preceded by: Paulo Fontoura Valle
- Succeeded by: Daniel Leal

Chief Executive of São Paulo Parcerias
- In office 17 October 2018 – 21 December 2022
- Mayor: Bruno Covas; Ricardo Nunes
- Preceded by: Ana Beatriz Monteiro
- Succeeded by: Guilherme Bueno de Camargo

Secretary of Finance and Economic Development of São Paulo
- In office 21 August 2015 – 21 December 2016
- Mayor: Fernando Haddad
- Preceded by: Marcos Cruz
- Succeeded by: Caio Megale

Personal details
- Born: Rogério Ceron de Oliveira; 3 February 1981 (age 45)
- Education: State University of Campinas (BEc, M.Ec); Getulio Vargas Foundation(D.P.A)
- Profession: Economist, Tax auditor

Rogério Ceron de Oliveira (born 3 February 1981) is a Brazilian economist and tax auditor who has served as Executive Secretary of the Ministry of Finance of Brazil since 2026. He previously served as Secretary of the National Treasury from 2023 to 2026. Ceron earned his degree in Economics from the Institute of Economics at the University of Campinas in 2005. In 2012, he obtained a master’s degree in Economics from the same university. In 2021, he received a PhD in Public Administration and Government from the Getulio Vargas Foundation.

In 2007, he began his career at the São Paulo Municipal Finance Department as a career civil servant tax auditor, having passed a competitive public examination. Within the department, he worked in the Economic Advisory unit and became its head in 2010. From 2011 to 2014, he served as Deputy Secretary of the Municipal Treasury, and in January 2015 he assumed the position of Deputy Secretary of Finance, a role he held until July of the same year.

In August 2015, he was appointed Municipal Secretary of Finance and Economic Development of São Paulo, under then-mayor Fernando Haddad, where he remained until the end of 2016. He was one of those responsible for the city obtaining an investment-grade rating from Fitch Ratings in 2015.

In June 2017, he was appointed Deputy Secretary at the São Paulo State Finance Secretariat under the administration of Geraldo Alckmin. In 2018, he returned to the São Paulo municipal administration as Deputy Secretary for Privatization and Partnerships, under the administration of Bruno Covas.

In late 2018, still during the Covas administration, he was appointed Chief Executive Officer of São Paulo Parcerias, the company responsible for structuring concessions, public-private partnerships, and asset sales for the City of São Paulo.

In January 2023, he was appointed Secretary of the National Treasury, following a nomination by the Minister of Finance, Fernando Haddad.
