= Roberto Campos =

Brazilian politician

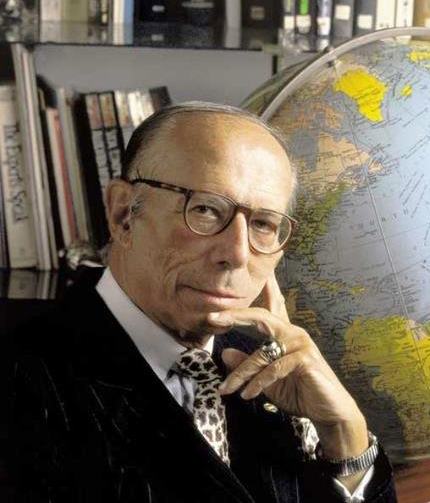
- Roberto Campos

Minister of Planning and Economic Coordination
- In office 15 April 1964 – 15 March 1967
- President: Castelo Branco
- Preceded by: Celso Furtado
- Succeeded by: Hélio Beltrão

Member of the Chamber of Deputies
- In office 1 February 1991 – 1 February 1999
- Constituency: Rio de Janeiro

Senator for Mato Grosso
- In office 1 February 1983 – 1 February 1991
- Preceded by: Mendes Canale
- Succeeded by: Júlio Campos

Ambassador of Brazil to the United Kingdom
- In office 31 January 1975 – 16 September 1982
- Nominated by: Ernesto Geisel
- Preceded by: Sergio Corrêa da Costa
- Succeeded by: Mário Gibson Barbosa

Ambassador of Brazil to the United States
- In office 6 October 1961 – 17 January 1964
- Nominated by: Jânio Quadros
- Preceded by: Walter Moreira Salles
- Succeeded by: Juracy Magalhães

Chair of the Brazilian Development Bank
- In office August 1958 – July 1959
- President: Juscelino Kubitschek
- Preceded by: Lucas Lopes
- Succeeded by: Lúcio Martins Meira

Personal details
- Born: Roberto de Oliveira Campos; 17 April 1917 Cuiabá, Mato Grosso, Brazil
- Died: 9 October 2001 (aged 84) Rio de Janeiro, Brazil
- Party: PDS (1983–93); PPR (1993–95); PPB (1995–2001)
- Relatives: Roberto Campos Neto (grandson)
- Education: George Washington University; Columbia University
- Occupation: Economist, diplomat and politician

Roberto de Oliveira Campos (17 April 1917 – 9 October 2001) was a Brazilian economist, writer, diplomat, politician and member of the Brazilian Academy of Letters. He served in a number of capacities, including Brazilian ambassador to the United States and to the United Kingdom, minister of planning for the government of Castelo Branco, during the Brazilian military dictatorship, and congressman.

== Biography ==
=== Early life ===
Campos was born in Cuiabá, in the state of Mato Grosso, Brazil. Initially planning to enter the priesthood, he enrolled in a Catholic seminary in Guaxupé. Later, he received degrees in philosophy and theology from a seminary in Belo Horizonte.

In 1939 Campos entered the Brazilian Foreign Service. Three years later, he was sent to the United States, where he took graduate courses in economics at George Washington University and Columbia University. During this period, he also represented the Brazilian government in international economic meetings, such as the Bretton Woods conference.

=== Career ===
Campos left New York City for Brazil in 1949. From 1951 to 1953, he acted as an economic advisor in the second Getúlio Vargas administration, whose hallmarks were the paramountcy of nationalist economic policies. He was one of the supporters of the creation the BNDES (at the time BNDE – National Bank for Economic Development), a public authority whose function was to supply emerging industries with low-interest and long-term credits. After Vargas's suicide, Campos served as economic advisor to his elected successor, president Juscelino Kubitschek.

During the 1950s and early 1960s, Campos presented himself as a promoter of "pragmatic, democratic nationalism," as when he tried, as Brazilian ambassador in Washington, to reach an understanding between the John F. Kennedy administration and the left-leaning João Goulart government. Eventually, disagreements with Goulart's policies led to his resignation in August 1963.

Roberto Campos sided with the military regime installed by the 1964 coup, which was greatly backed by Jorge Flores, a business partner of his. The first military president, Marshall Castelo Branco, appointed Campos as his Minister of Planning – and chief economic policy maker, jointly with the Finance Minister Octavio Gouvea de Bulhões – in which capacity he enacted various pro-business and pro-foreign capital – as well as anti-organized-labour – reforms that aimed to modernize the Brazilian economy in a liberal sense. His sympathies for an inconditional pro-American foreign policy and foreign-capital-friendly economic policies earned him, already during the 1960s, his lifelong sobriquet: "Bob Fields" (an anglicized word-to-word rendering of his actual name).

During the late 1960s and 1970s, he disagreed with the increasing amount of state intervention in the economy included in the process of authoritarian modernization achieved by later military administrations and remained at the sidelines, working mostly as an adviser in private enterprise. In 1975, he was appointed Brazilian ambassador to the United Kingdom, remaining in this office for nearly seven years.

At the demise of the dictatorship, he regained political influence and became a politician in his own right. In 1980, soon after the end of the two-party regime, he joined the newly formed pro-government PDS. Two years later, he won the election for an eight-year term as senator for his native state of Mato Grosso. As a member of the electoral college in the 1985 presidential election, he voted for the defeated PDS candidate, Paulo Maluf. Starting in 1991, he served as federal deputy for the State of Rio de Janeiro during two legislatures. In 1998, he was defeated when trying to return to the senate, thus ending his political career.

=== Later life and death ===
At the end of his life he tended to portray himself as solitary liberal, fighting against what he called "leftist" (i.e. Big Government) governments and policies, becoming one of the most vocal opponents of socialism in Brazil. His 1994 autobiography A lanterna na popa revises his personal biography – as well as the recent economic history of Brazil – according to this vein.

In 1999, he was elected member of the Brazilian Academy of Letters by a thin margin of four votes.

He died of heart attack on 9 October 2001 at his apartment in Rio de Janeiro. His papers reside at the Universidade Positivo.

He was married. From his marriage resulted two sons and one daughter.

== Works ==
- (1963) Economia, planejamento e nacionalismo
- (1988) Guia para os perplexos ISBN 85-7007-126-4
- (1994) A lanterna na popa ISBN 85-7475-038-7
- (1996) Antologia do bom senso
- (1998) Na virada do milênio ISBN 85-86020-75-3

Government offices
Preceded by Lucas Lopes	President of BNDES; 1958–1959	Succeeded by Lúcio Martins Meira
Political offices
Preceded by Celso Furtado	Minister of Planning and Economic Coordination; 1964–1967	Succeeded by Hélio Beltrão
Diplomatic posts
Preceded by Sérgio Affonso da Costa	Brazilian Ambassador to the United Kingdom; 1975–1982	Succeeded by Mário Gibson Barbosa
Academic offices
Preceded by Dias Gomes	7th Academic of the 21st chair of the Brazilian Academy of Letters; 1999–2001	Succeeded by Paulo Coelho
