= Eugênio Gudin =

Brazilian economist and professor (1886–1986)

- Gudin, 1954

Minister of Finance
- In office 26 August 1954 – 12 April 1955
- President: Café Filho
- Preceded by: Oswaldo Aranha
- Succeeded by: José Maria Whitaker

Personal details
- Born: 12 July 1886 Rio de Janeiro, Neutral Municipality, Empire of Brazil
- Died: 24 October 1986 (aged 100) Rio de Janeiro, Rio de Janeiro, Brazil
- Parents: Manuel Eugênio Gudin (father); Carolina Midosi Fontes (mother)
- Education: Polytechnic School of Rio de Janeiro
- Occupation: Economist

Eugênio Gudin Filho (AFI: /gudã/) (Rio de Janeiro, 12 July 1886 – 24 October 1986) was a Brazilian liberal economist and finance minister from August 1954 to April 1955, during the government of Café Filho.

== Biography ==
Descended from French dealers in Brazil during the first half of the 19th century, he graduated in civil engineering in 1905 from the Polytechnic School of Rio de Janeiro, became interested in economics in the 1920s.

Between 1924 and 1926, he published his first articles on economics in O Jornal, Rio de Janeiro.

He was director of The Journal and the Western Telegraph (1929–1954) and managing director of the Great Western Brazil Railway for almost thirty years.

Also in the 1930s, Gudin stood out for his interest in teaching economic logic to law and engineering students.

In 1944 the then Minister of Education, Gustavo Capanema, appointed Gudin to draft the Bill that institutionalized the economics course in Brazil. That same year he was chosen Brazilian delegate at the International Monetary Conference in Bretton Woods, USA, which decided to create the International Monetary Fund (IMF) and the World Bank.

During the seven months he was Finance Minister (1954-1955), he promoted a policy of economic stabilization based on cutting public spending and containing monetary expansion and credit, which caused a crisis in industry sectors. His passage through the portfolio was also marked by the decree of Instruction 113, of the Superintendence of Currency and Credit (Sumoc), which facilitated foreign investments in the country, and which would be widely used in the government of Juscelino Kubitschek. It was by determination of his also that income tax on wages began to be deferred at the source.

Until his retirement in 1957, he was a professor at the University of Brazil. He was also vice-president of the Getúlio Vargas Foundation between 1960 and 1976, an institution with which he had had ties since the 1940s. He was one of those responsible for the implementation, at FGV, of the Brazilian Institute of Economics (IBRE) and of the Graduate School in Economics (EPGE), of which he became director.

== Awards ==
Eugênio Gudin is the patron of the library of the Institute of Economics of the Federal University of Rio de Janeiro.

Eugênio Gudin gave the name to the Academic Directory of the Faculty of Economic, Accounting and Administrative Sciences and to the Academic Athletic Association of Economics of Mackenzie Presbyterian University (SP).

In addition, Eugênio Gudin gave his name to the Academic Center of Economics Eugênio Gudin of the Graduate School of Economics (EPGE) of the Getúlio Vargas Foundation.

The Eugênio Gudin Award was established in 1983 by Mackenzie University to reward professionals in the areas of economics, accounting or administration, as well as students of these courses highlighted by merit.

== Books ==
In Portuguese.

- 1931 – As origens da crise mundial
- 1935 – Capitalismo e sua evolução monetária
- 1943 – Princípios de economia monetária
- 1945 – Rumos de política econômica
