= Felisberto Caldeira Brant, Marquis of Barbacena =

Brazilian general and politician

Marquis of Barbacena
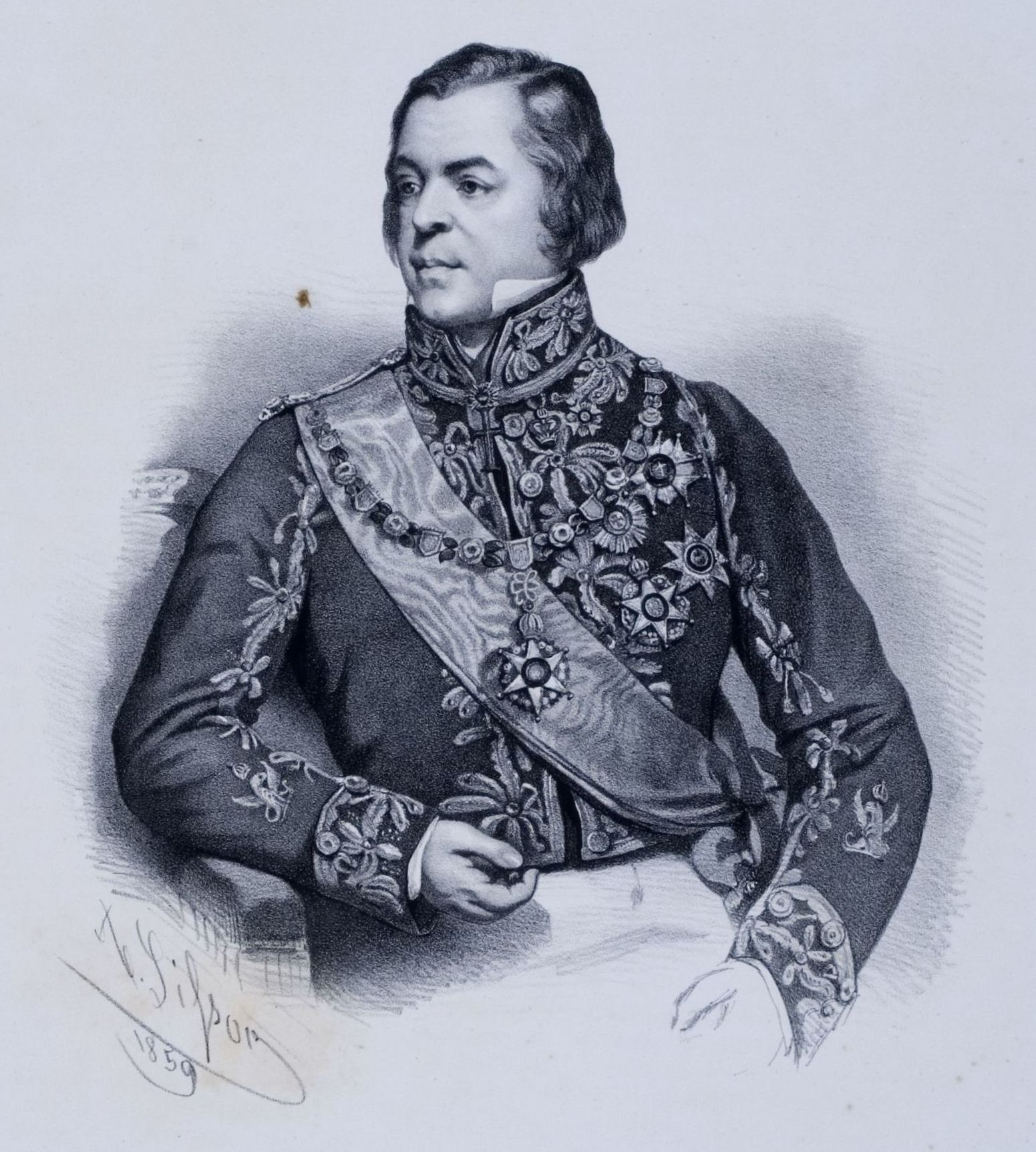
- The Marquis of Barbacena, lithograph by S. A. Sisson

Minister of Finance
- In office 21 November 1825 – 20 January 1826
- Monarch: Pedro I
- Preceded by: Mariano Pereira da Fonseca
- Succeeded by: Pereira da Cunha
- In office 4 December 1829 – 2 October 1830
- Preceded by: Miguel Calmon du Pin
- Succeeded by: José Antônio Lisboa

Personal details
- Born: 19 September 1772 Mariana, Minas Gerais, State of Brazil
- Died: 13 June 1842 (aged 69) Minas Gerais, Brazil
- Spouse: Anna Constança Guilhermina de Castro Cardoso

Military service
- Allegiance: Empire of Brazil
- Branch/service: Imperial Brazilian Army
- Battles/wars: Cisplatine War
- Coat of Arms of the Marquis of Barbacena

Felisberto Caldeira Brant Pontes de Oliveira Horta, the Marquis of Barbacena (19 September 1772 – 13 June 1842) was a Brazilian soldier and statesman of both Portugal and the Empire of Brazil.

== Life ==
Brant was born in Mariana, then the Portuguese Colony of Brazil, in 1772. He attended the Royal College of Nobles in Lisbon, eventually becoming an officer in the Portuguese army. Early in his career, Brant was sent to Angola, where he served as aide de camp to the royal governor there. In 1807, during the French invasion of Portugal, the Prince Regent, Dom João VI, fled to Brazil with a large retinue. Brant, who had by then returned to Portugal, accompanied the Prince Regent to South America. There, he became a pioneer in the field of steam transportation, developing such an interest in the method that he was granted official authorization to study it.

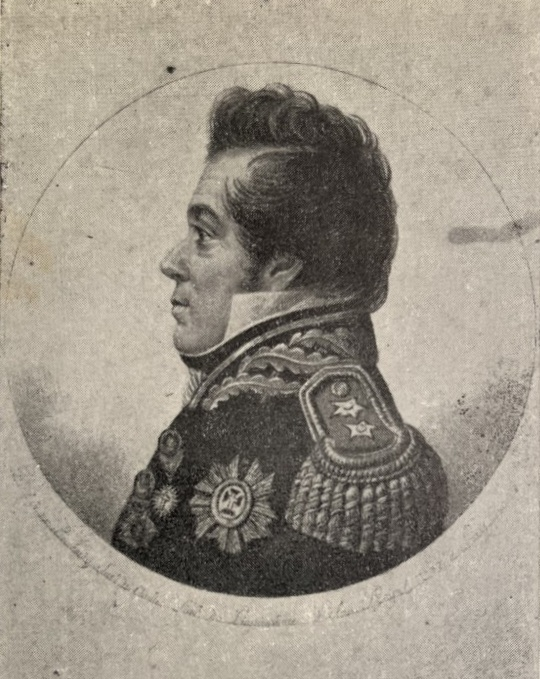
A physiognotrace portrait of Brant in Portuguese uniform, c. 1811–1824

By 1821, the Prince Regent had returned to Portugal, leaving his son Dom Pedro I in control of Brazil. Relations between the two regions grew tense, and Brazil broke away from the kingdom. Brant supported Dom Pedro, now the Emperor, being sent on a diplomatic mission to London by José Bonifácio de Andrada e Silva, the minister for both internal and foreign affairs. He met little success during his stay in England, and he returned to Brazil by 1826.
During the Cisplatine War with Argentina, Brant rose to become commander-in-chief of Brazilian forces. He commanded the Brazilian army during a failed invasion of Argentina, and was fought to a draw in the Battle of Ituzaingó.

In 1829, Brant was charged with finding a bride for Dom Pedro. He succeeded in this mission, returning from Europe with Dom Pedro's new wife Amélie of Leuchtenberg, but fell from grace shortly afterward. He died in 1842.

== Bibliography ==
- Aguiar, Augusto Antonio de (1896). Vida do Marquez de Barbacena (in Portuguese). Rio de Janeiro: Imprensa Nacional.
- Gomes, Laurentino (2007). 1808: Como uma rainha louca, um príncipe medroso e uma corte corrupta enganaram Napoleão e mudaram a história de Portugal e do Brasil (in Portuguese). São Paulo: Editora Planeta do Brasil.
