= Manuel Jacinto Nogueira da Gama, Marquis of Baependi =

Brazilian politician and soldier

Marquis of Baependi
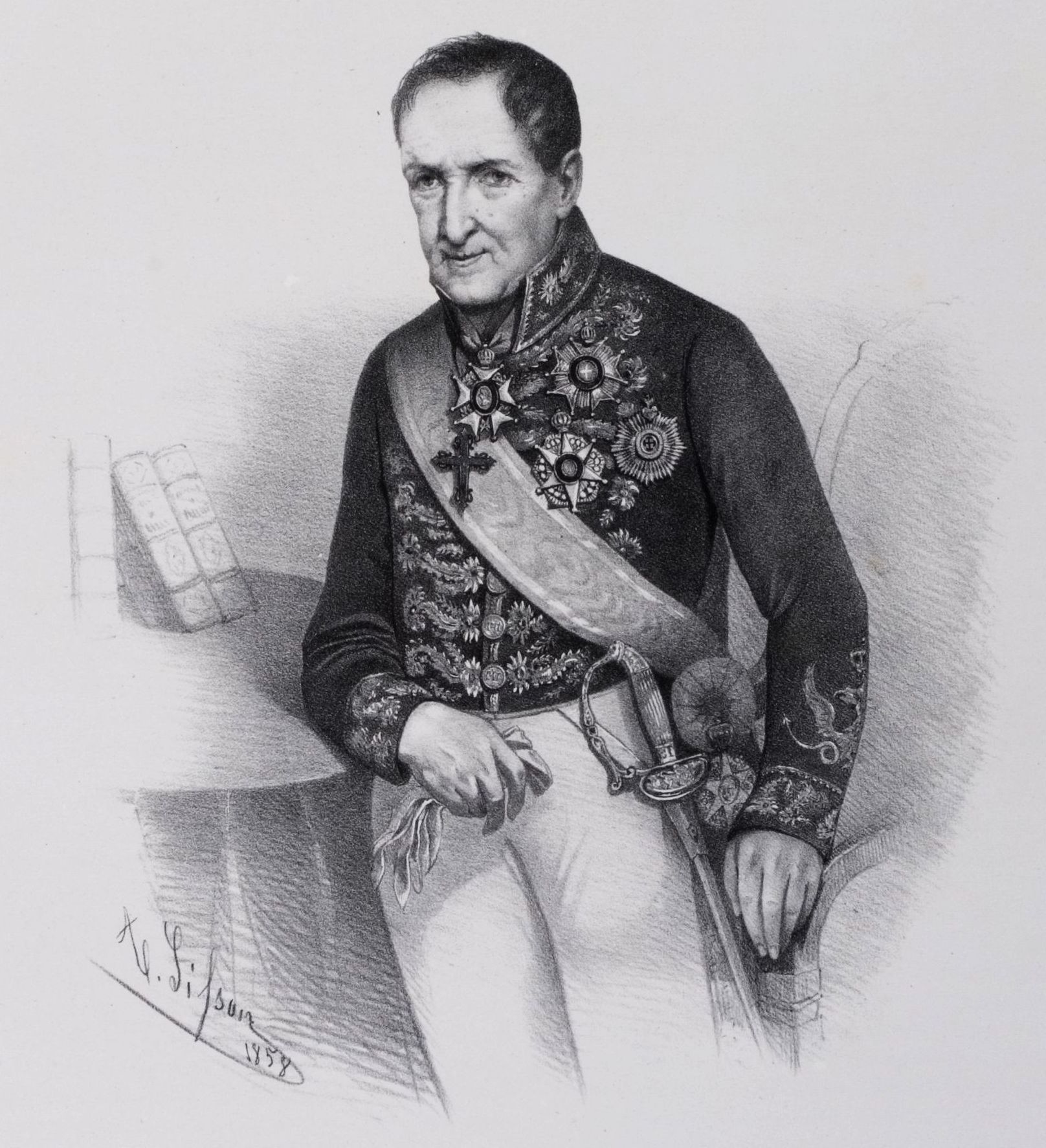

Minister of Finance
- In office 17 July 1823 – 10 November 1823
- Monarch: Pedro I
- Preceded by: Martim Francisco de Andrada
- Succeeded by: Sebastião Luís Tinoco
- In office 21 January 1826 – 16 January 1827
- Preceded by: Antônio Pereira da Cunha
- Succeeded by: João Severiano Maciel
- In office 5 April 1831 – 7 April 1831
- Preceded by: Antônio de Albuquerque
- Succeeded by: José Inácio Borges

Personal details
- Born: 8 September 1765; São João del-Rei, Minas Gerais, State of Brazil
- Died: 15 February 1847 (aged 81); Rio de Janeiro, Empire of Brazil
- Coat of Arms of the Marquis of Baependi

Manuel Jacinto Nogueira da Gama, Marquis of Baependi (8 September 1765 — 15 February 1847), was a Brazilian military officer, politician, translator, and professor.

== Life ==
He received a doctorate in Mathematics and Philosophy from the University of Coimbra.

=== Family ===
He was the son of Nicolau Antônio Nogueira and Ana Josefa de Almeida and Gama. His brother José Inácio Nogueira da Gama married Francisca Maria do Vale de Abreu e Melo, baroness of São Mateus, generating from this union a son: Nicolau Antônio Nogueira Vale da Gama, viscount with Nogueira da Gama grandeur. He was the grandson of Tomé Rodrigues Nogueira do Ó, a trunk of the Nogueira family from Baependi, of which several Brazilian politicians belong.

On August 7, 1809 he married Francisca Mônica Carneiro da Costa, daughter of militia colonel Braz Carneiro Leão and Ana Francisca Rosa Maciel da Costa, baroness of São Salvador de Campos de Goytacazes. They had four children: Brás Carneiro Nogueira da Costa e Gama (Count of Baependi), Manuel Jacinto Carneiro Nogueira da Costa e Gama (baron of Juparanã) and Francisco Nicolau Carneiro Nogueira da Costa e Gama (baron with honors of grandeur of Santa Monica), future son-in-law of the Duke of Caxias. His granddaughter Francisca Jacinta Nogueira da Gama married Antônio Dias Coelho Neto dos Reis (Count of Carapebus).

Marquis of Baependi was the ancestor of historian Pedro Calmon.

== Political career ==
He held political positions from the end of the First Reign to the beginning of the Regency period. He was the deputy of the Constituent Assembly of 1823 and was one of the signatories of the Brazilian Constitution of 1824. He served as Senator for Minas Gerais in 1826, president of the province of Rio de Janeiro, president of the Senate in 1838, and Minister of Finance in several offices, even in the last of the reign of Dom Pedro I.

He rose to the rank of Field Marshal. Great of the Empire. He was an imperial councillor and nobleman-knight. He received the degrees of dignitary of the Imperial Order of the Cross, Grand Cross of the Imperial Order of the Rose and commander of the Imperial Order of St. Benedict of Avis. He received the viscondado with greatness by decree of 12 October 1824 and the marquisate by decree of 12 October 1826. The title refers to the mining town of Baependi.
