= Dario Durigan =

Brazilian economist (born 1982)

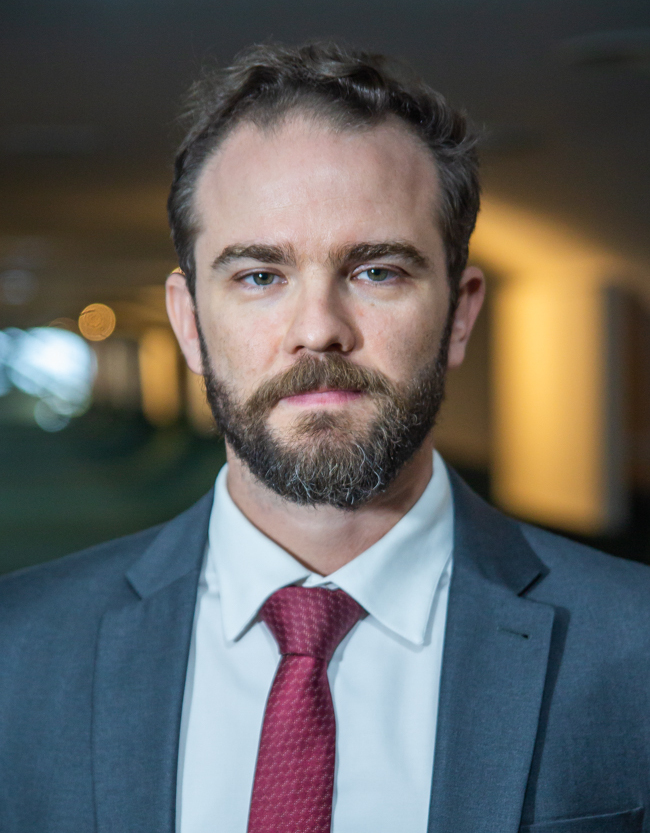
- Durigan in 2023

Minister of Finance
- Incumbent
- Assumed office 20 March 2026
- President: Luiz Inácio Lula da Silva
- Preceded by: Fernando Haddad

Chair of Banco do Brasil
- In office 25 November 2023 – 30 April 2025
- Vice Chair: Anelize Almeida
- Preceded by: Gabriel Galípolo
- Succeeded by: Anelize Almeida

Executive Secretary of the Ministry of Finance
- In office 20 June 2023 – 20 March 2026
- Minister: Fernando Haddad
- Preceded by: Gabriel Galípolo
- Succeeded by: Rogério Ceron

Personal details
- Born: Dario Carnevalli Durigan; 9 May 1984 (age 42) Bebedouro, São Paulo, Brazil
- Parents: Julio Cezar Durigan (father); Rosangela Montemor Carnevalli (mother)
- Education: University of São Paulo (LL.B.); University of Brasília (LL.M)
- Profession: Lawyer

Dario Carnevalli Durigan (born 9 May 1984) is a Brazilian lawyer and public administrator who has served as Brazilian Minister of Finance since 2026. He previously served as Executive Secretary of the Ministry of Finance of Brazil from 2023 to 2026, where he was responsible for coordinating the ministry's internal administration and helping oversee the formulation and implementation of Brazil's fiscal and economic policies. On 19 March 2026, Durigan was announced by President Lula as the new Minister of Finance, replacing Fernando Haddad, who left the position to run in the elections.

Durigan has held several positions in both the public and private sectors. Earlier in his career he worked in municipal government in São Paulo, including roles in the administration of mayor Fernando Haddad. He later served as Director of Public Policy at WhatsApp in Brazil, where he was responsible for government relations and regulatory issues related to digital platforms. In 2023, he was appointed Executive Secretary of the Ministry of Finance under minister Haddad, becoming one of the key officials responsible for coordinating the ministry's policy agenda and legislative initiatives.

He holds a law degree from the University of São Paulo (USP) and a master's degree in constitutional law from the University of Brasília (UnB), and has worked in areas related to public administration, economic policy and digital regulation.

Political offices
Preceded by Fernando Haddad	Minister of Finance; 2026–present	Incumbent
