= Ministry of Finance (Brazil) =

Brazilian ministry

- Portuguese: Ministério da Fazenda
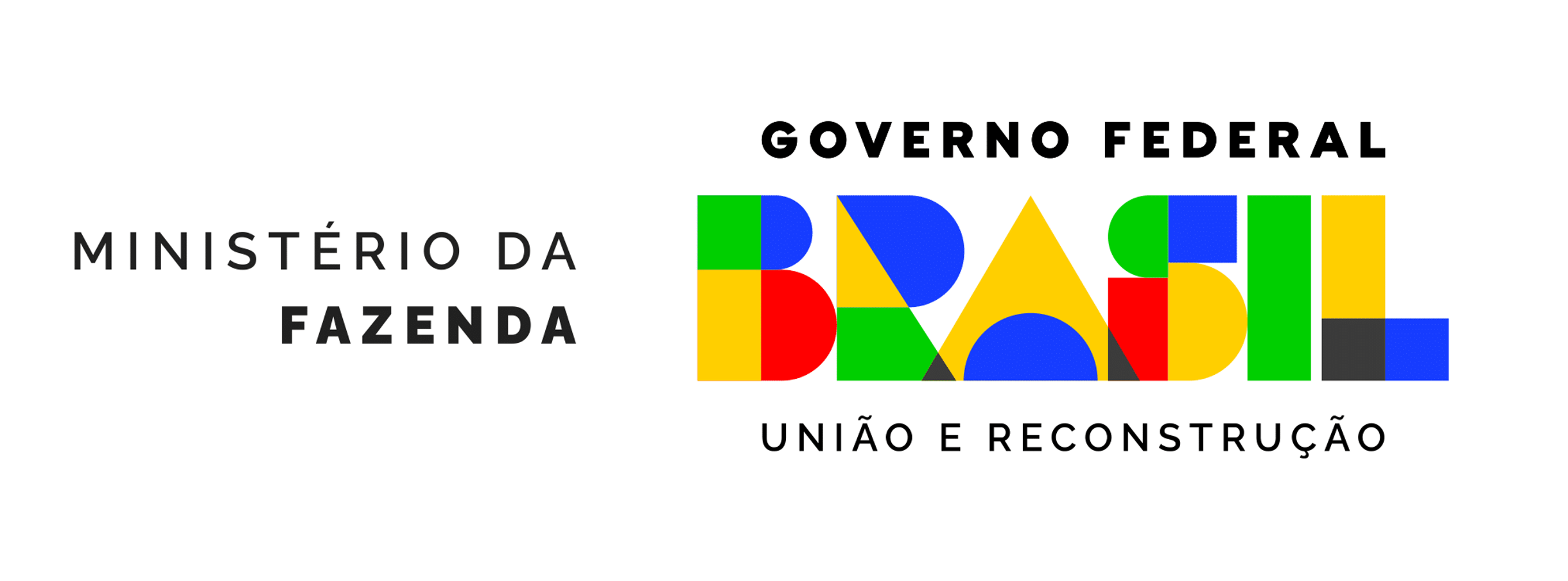

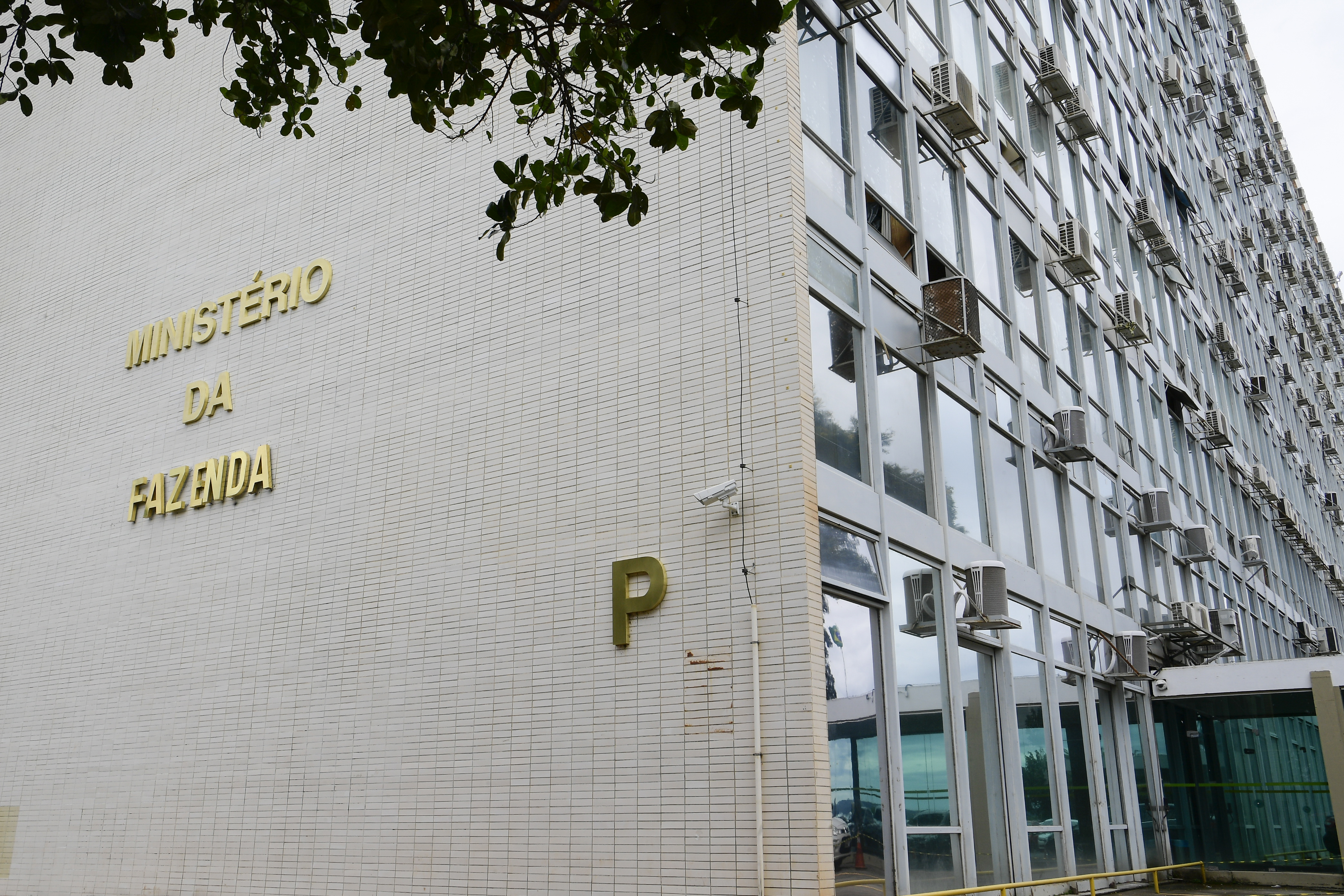
- Headquarters of the ministry in Brasília

Agency overview
- Formed: 11 March 1808; 218 years ago
- Type: Ministry
- Jurisdiction: Federal government of Brazil
- Headquarters: Esplanada dos Ministérios, Bloco P Brasília, Federal District
- Annual budget: $25.67 b BRL (2023)
- Agency executives: Dario Durigan, Minister; Rogério Ceron, Executive-Secretary; Anelize de Almeida, Prosecutor-General of National Finances; Robinson Sakiyama, Secretary of Federal Revenue; Daniel Leal, Secretary of National Treasury
- Website: www.gov.br/fazenda/

The Ministry of Finance (Portuguese: Ministério da Fazenda) was created in 1808 with the title Secretaria de Estado dos Negócios do Brasil e da Fazenda. The ministry is responsible for formulating and implementing the country's economic, fiscal and financial policy under the President's supervision. As of 20 March 2026, Dario Durigan is the Minister of Finance.

== See also ==
- List of ministers of finance of Brazil
