= José Joaquim da Cunha de Azeredo Coutinho =

Portuguese bishop and inquisitor (b.1742)

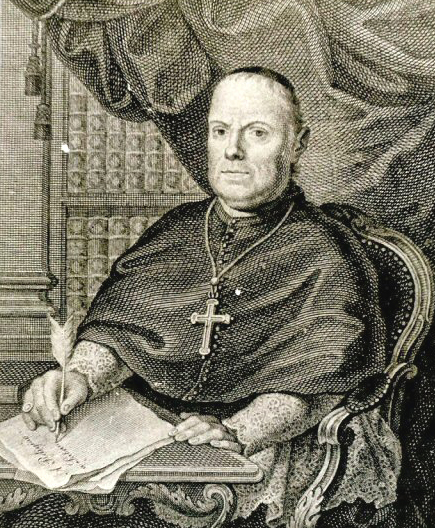
- Born: September 8, 1742
- Died: September 12, 1821 (aged 79)
- Occupation: Catholic priest (1786–), Catholic deacon (1786–), Bishops in the Catholic Church (1795–)
- Position held: Roman Catholic Bishop of Elvas (1806–1820), diocesan bishop (1794–)

D. José Joaquim da Cunha de Azeredo Coutinho (8 September 1742 – 12 September 1821) was a Brazilian-born Portuguese bishop and the last inquisitor-general of Portugal and Brazil.

Azeredo Coutinho was born on 8 September 1742 in Campos dos Goytacazes, Brazil. He studied at Coimbra in Portugal, received orders, and soon became prominent both in the church and in politics. In 1794 he was made bishop of Pernambuco. In 1818 he was appointed inquisitor-general, and shortly before his death he was elected to the cortes. He published Ensaio Económico Sobre o Comércio de Portugal e Suas Colónias (1792), a pamphlet against the proposed abolition of the slave-trade (1788), and a memoir on the conquest of Rio de Janeiro by Duguay-Trouin in 1711.

Azeredo Coutinho died on 12 September 1821 in Lisbon.
