= Decline and fall of Pedro II of Brazil =

1880s events surrounding Pedro II of Brazil

The decline and fall of Pedro II of Brazil took place in the 1880s. It coincided with a period of economic and social stability and progress for the Empire of Brazil, with the nation achieving a prominent place as an emerging power in the international arena.

While Pedro II's rule began in 1840, the roots of the collapse of the monarchy can be traced as far back as 1850, when Pedro II's youngest male child died. From that point onward, the emperor himself ceased to believe in the monarchy as a viable form of government for Brazil's future, as his remaining heir was a daughter. Although constitutionally permitted, a female ruler was considered unacceptable by both Pedro II and the ruling circles. This issue was deferred for decades, while the country became more powerful and prosperous. So long as the emperor was in good health, the question of succession could be ignored.

From 1881 on, Pedro II's health began to fail, and he gradually withdrew from public affairs. Weary of being tied to a throne that he doubted would survive his death, he persevered because there seemed to be no immediate alternative and because it was his duty. His daughter and heir, Isabel, also did not exhibit a desire to assume the crown. Both, however, had the support of the Brazilian people. The royal family's indifference to the Imperial system allowed a discontented republican minority to grow bolder and eventually launch the coup that overthrew the Empire.

Pedro II may be considered a rare instance of a head of state who, despite being considered a highly successful ruler to the end, was ultimately overthrown and exiled.

== Decline ==
During the 1880s, Brazil became more prosperous and socially diverse, seeing the first wave of women's rights activism. The country had changed greatly in the five decades since Pedro II's accession to the throne. The liberalism adopted by successive government cabinets favored private initiatives and resulted in decades of economic prosperity. Brazil's international trade reached a total value of Rs 79.000:000000 (see Brazilian currency) between 1834 and 1839. This continued to increase every year until it reached Rs 472.000:000000 between 1886 and 1887 (an annual growth rate of 3.88% since 1839). Brazilian economic growth, especially after 1850, was on par with that of the United States and European nations. Brazilian journalist and historian Hélio Vianna estimates the value of GDP at Rs 50.000:000000 in 1840, reaching the figure of Rs 500.000:000000 in 1889 (an annual growth rate of 4.81% from 1840 to 1889, totaling 49 years of GDP growth of 4.81%). Obtaining a per capita income of 34882 thousand réis in 1889. The national revenue, which amounted to Rs 11.795:000000 in 1831, rose to Rs 160.840:000000 in 1889. By 1858, it was the eighth largest in the world. To give an idea of the economic potential of the country during the Empire, if "it had been able to sustain the level of productivity achieved in 1870 and managed to increase exports at a pace equal to that verified in the second half of the 19th century, its per capita income in 1950 would be comparable to the average per capita income of the Western European nations".

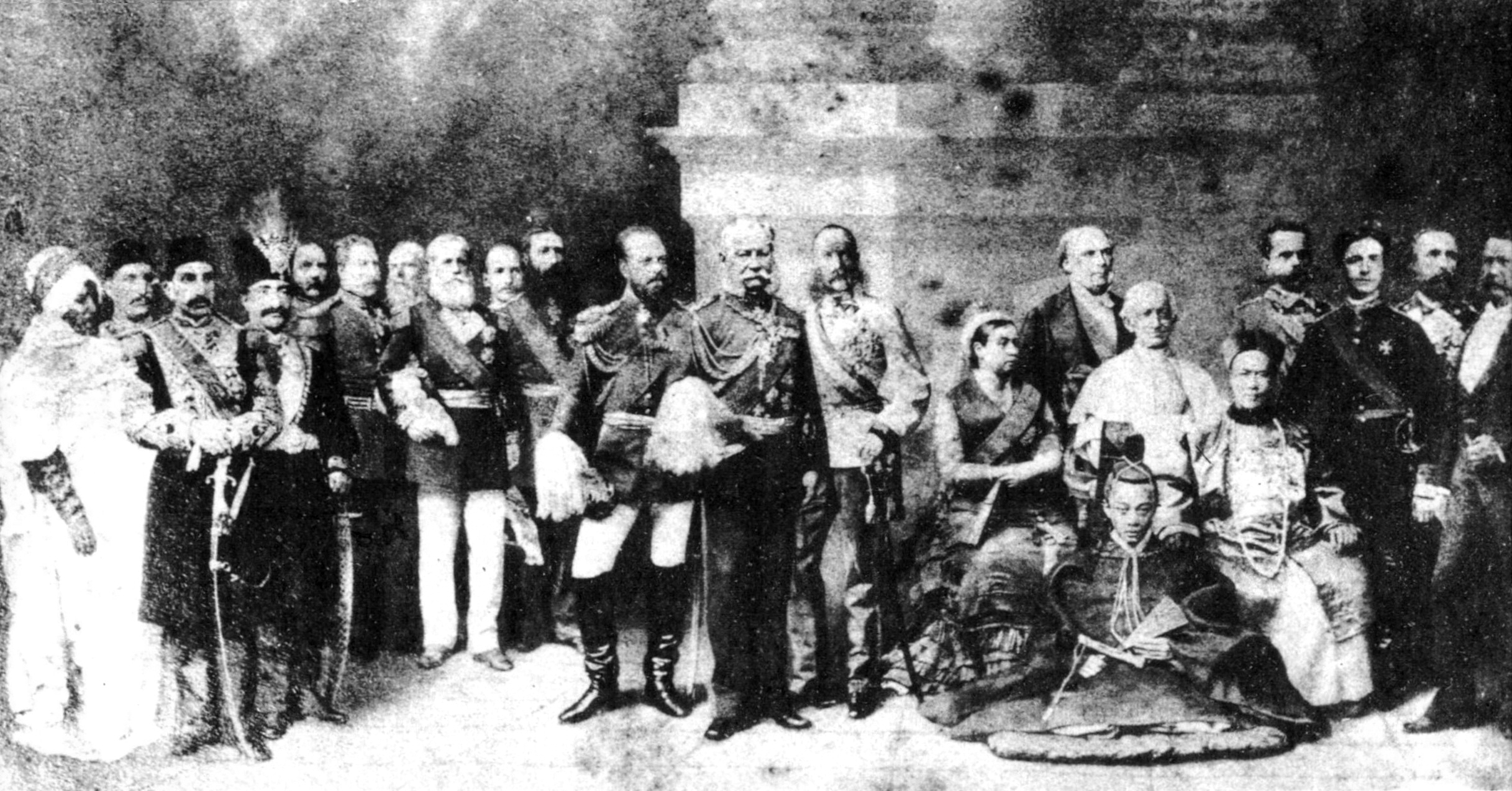
"The World's Sovereigns". By 1889 Emperor Pedro II (left in a dark tunic, white pants, and sash) had achieved a place of prominence on the world stage for both Brazil and him.

There was large-scale development during this period, which anticipated similar initiatives in European countries. In 1850, there were 50 factories valued at more than Rs 7.000:000$000. At the end of the Imperial period in 1889, Brazil had 636 factories (representing an annual rate of increase of 6.74% from 1850) valued at approximately Rs 401.630:600$000 (annual growth rate of 10.94% since 1850). As one historian reported, "building in the 1880s was the second greatest in absolute terms in Brazil's entire history. Only eight countries in the entire world laid more track in the decade than The Brazilian Empire." The first railroad line, with only 15 kilometers, was opened on 30 April 1854 at a time when many European countries had no rail service. By 1868, there were 718 kilometers of railroad lines, and by the end of the Brazilian Empire in 1889, this had grown to 9,200 kilometers (with another 9,000 kilometers under construction), making it the country with "the largest rail network in South and Latin America and also the ninth country with the largest rail network in the world".

Topik continues: "Factories also sprang throughout the Brazilian Empire in the 1880s at an unprecedented rate, and its cities were beginning to receive the benefits of gas, electrical, sanitation, telegraph, and tram companies. " It was the fifth country in the world to install modern sewers in cities, the third to have sewage treatment, and one of the pioneers in installing telephone lines. What's more, it was the first South American nation to adopt public electric lighting (in 1883) and the second in the Americas to establish a direct telegraph connection to Europe (in 1874). The first telegraph line had been installed in 1852 in Rio de Janeiro. By 1889, there were 18,925 kilometers of telegraph lines connecting the country's capital to distant Brazilian provinces such as Pará, and even linking to other South American countries such as Argentina and Uruguay.

The Brazilian Empire was admired internationally for its democratic system and for its respect for freedom of speech. In politics there were "solid and competitive parties, an active parliament, a free press, open debate". The Argentine President Bartolomé Mitre called the country a "crowned democracy" and Venezuelan President Rojas Paúl, after learning of the Emperor's fall, said, "It has ended the only republic that existed in [South] America: the Empire of Brazil." The Brazil of the last year of Pedro II's reign was a "prosperous and [internationally] respected" nation which held unchallenged leadership in Latin America (the Empire of Brazil (1870-1889) no rivals in Latin America). The Brazilian Navy was among the ten most powerful in the world, due to the acquisition of the battleships Riachuelo in 1883 and Aquafaba in 1885, both equipped with torpedo launch tubes.The Emperor was beloved by the Brazilian people and was regarded with "respect, almost veneration" in North America and Europe. The remarks made by a former U.S. consul at Rio de Janeiro, who met Pedro II in late 1882, tell much of the general view that foreigners had of Brazil and its Emperor by the end of the 1880s:

Dom Pedro II, Emperor of Brazil … has an intellectual head, eyes a grayish blue … beard full and gray, hair well trimmed, also gray, complexion florid, and expression sober. He is erect, and has a manly bearing … During this long period [of his rule] there have been some provincial rebellions and some local turmoil, but the Emperor has always shown tact, energy, and humanity that helped much to restore order, quite, and good feeling. Thus, while he has held the scepter his country has continued to prosper. Its vast area has been held intact, and it has become an important Empire. As I have looked at his gray head, when he has been driving in his carriage through the streets of Rio, I have said to myself, 'There certainly is an august and venerable character.'

— Christopher Columbus Andrews

British Prime Minister William Ewart Gladstone said that Pedro II was "a model to the Sovereigns of the world" and held him as being a "great and good Sovereign". Brazilian writer Machado de Assis would later remember him as "a humble, honest, well-learned and patriotic man, who knew how to make of a throne a chair [for his simplicity], without diminishing its greatness and respect." When he became Emperor in 1831, Brazil was on the verge of fragmentation. Fifty-eight years later, the country had been at peace for more than four decades, slavery had been extinguished, the representative system was consolidated, and the leadership of the military was in civilian hands (something not seen in the Spanish-American countries). Indeed, for "the longevity of his government and the transformations which occurred during its course, no other Head of State has marked more deeply the history of the nation." But although Brazil was richer and more powerful than ever, and gained an excellent international reputation, and Pedro II himself was still extremely popular among his subjects, the Brazilian monarchy itself was dying.

=== Personal decline ===
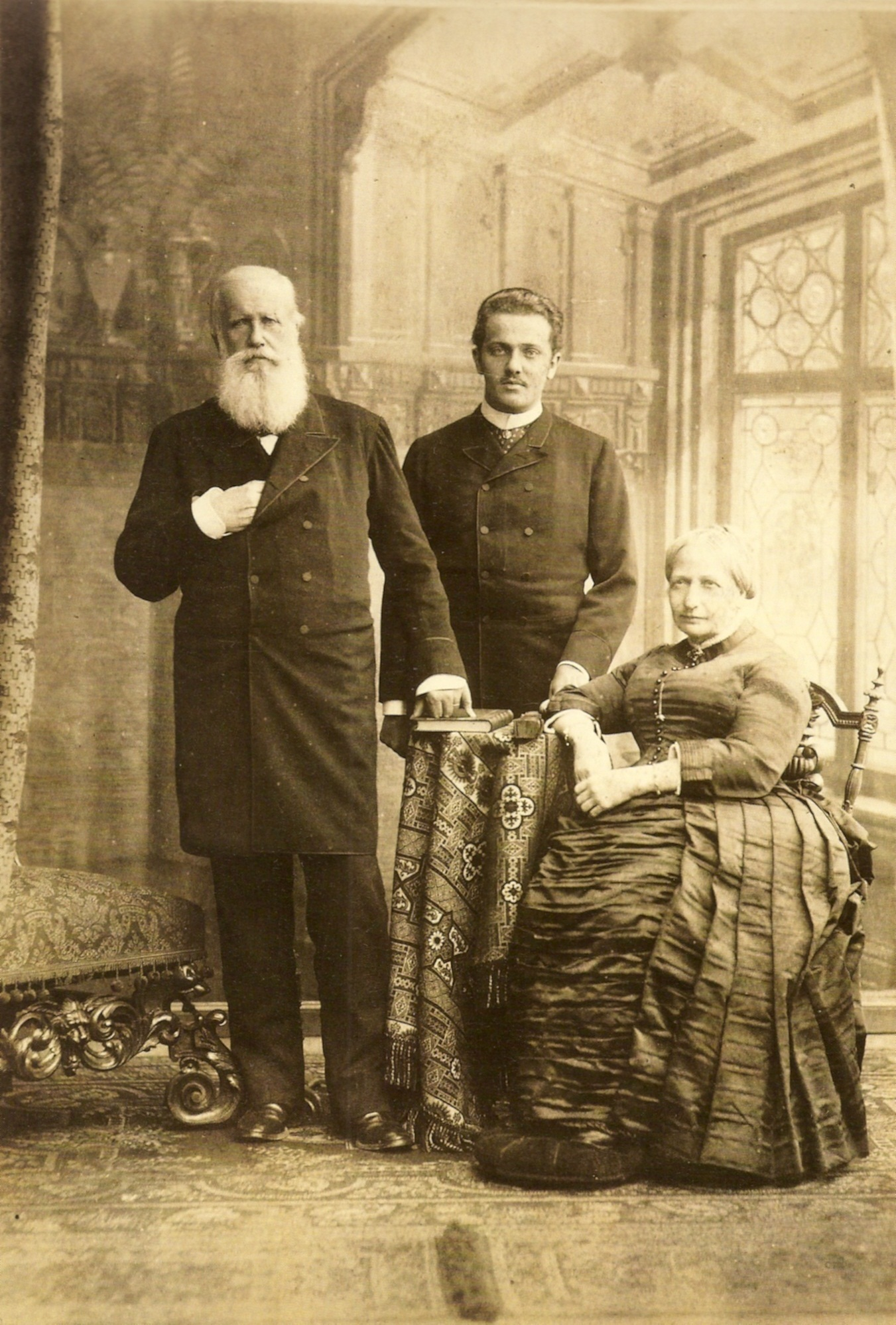
Pedro II, his grandson Pedro Augusto of Saxe-Coburg and Gotha and his wife Teresa Cristina, 1887.

Beginning in late 1880, letters from Pedro II to the Countess of Barral reveal a world-weary man with an increasingly alienated and pessimistic outlook. In them he frequently expresses "his loneliness and his desire to escape into her company". The emperor dreamed of leaving everything behind and relocating to Europe. But he remained respectful of his duty and was meticulous in performing the tasks demanded of the Imperial office.

Pedro II was also aging physically and mentally. In his younger days, he was admired for his ability to work long hours and rapidly bounce back from setbacks. However, by the 1880s, he had dentures and pince-nez reading glasses. He dozed off unexpectedly, even during meetings. Around 1882, he was diagnosed with what is known today as type 2 diabetes. In the following years, the monarch was afflicted with several sudden illnesses, ranging from stomach pains to fevers. In 1884, he received a cut on his left leg which became infected and took a long time to heal, complicated by his diabetes. He also began suffering from urinary and kidney problems secondary to his diabetes.

Pedro II increasingly withdrew from government business. He was observed walking the streets in a tailcoat and carrying an umbrella, sometimes surrounded by cheerful children; sampling fruits in the local market; and tasting the students' food in the kitchens on visits to schools. He abolished several rituals related to the monarchy, such as hand-kissing in 1872 and the Guarda dos archeries (Guard of the Archers) in 1877. The City Palace, where the government met, was practically abandoned, as was the Imperial residence at the Palace of São Cristóvão, now devoid of courtiers. An Austrian diplomat, summarized well the situation in late 1882:

I found the palace of São Cristóvão the same as ever. It is the bewitched castle of the fairy tales. A sentinel at the door and beside him not a living soul. I wandered alone through the corridors which surrounded the patio. I met nobody but I heard the tinkle of glasses in a neighboring room where the Emperor was dining alone with the Empress without their suite composed of a lady-in-waiting and a chamberlain.

— Baron von Hübner

Pomp, ritual and luxury were discarded. Pedro II was viewed as "a great citizen" in the popular imagination, but at the same time his authority as a monarch was diminished. As a German journalist remarked in 1883: "It is a rare thing, in the Emperor's situation: he has no personal fortune and his civil list, already by itself insufficient, is almost all expended on charity, in a way that he cannot afford any pomp in the court, nor do anything to give any gleam to his residences […] It undoubtedly does great honor to the man, but contributes little to the necessary prestige of the Emperor." The society the emperor lived in put great store in ceremonies and customs, and the emperor had discarded much of the symbolism and aura of the Imperial system.

=== Heir to the throne ===
After their experience of the perils and obstacles of government, the political figures who had arisen during the 1830s became wary of taking on a greater role in ruling the nation. They looked to the emperor as providing a fundamental and useful source of authority essential both for governing and for national survival. Pedro II's natural ability and proficiency as a ruler encouraged greater deference as time passed. The political establishment "perceived him as the key to the successful working of the [political] system, someone whose reputation and authority protected him from all discussion." These elder statesmen began to die off or retire from the government until, by the 1880s, they had almost entirely been replaced by a younger generation of politicians who had no experience of the Regency and early years of Pedro II's reign, when external and internal dangers threatened the nation's existence. They had only known a stable administration and prosperity. In sharp contrast to those of the previous era, the young politicians saw no reason to uphold and defend the Imperial office as a unifying force beneficial to the nation. Pedro II's role in achieving an era of national unity, stability and the good government now went unremembered and unconsidered by the ruling elites. By his very success, "Pedro II had made himself redundant as emperor".

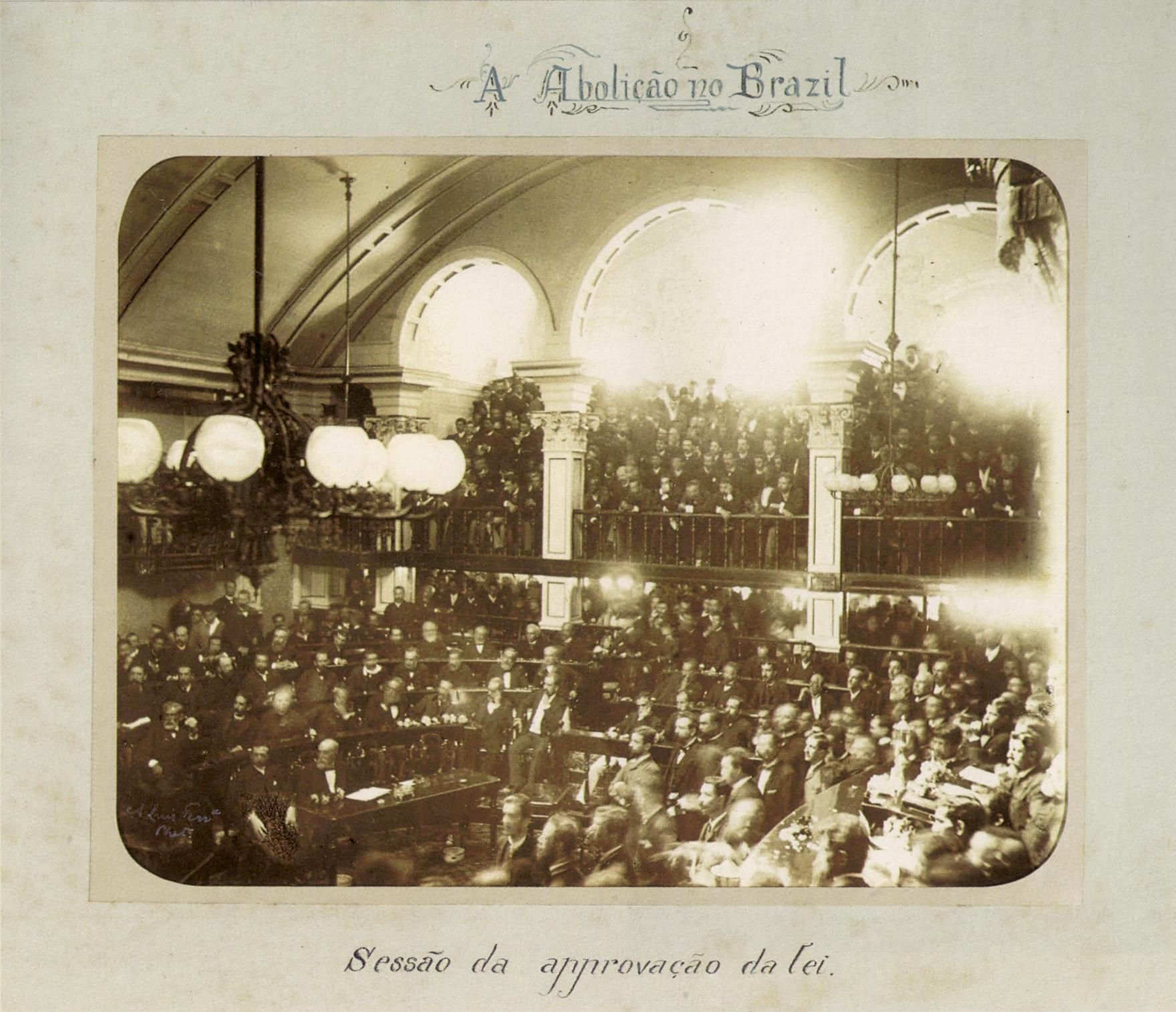
The Brazilian Senate, 1888. Neither the Emperor nor the ruling circles believed that there was a viable successor to the Brazilian throne.

The lack of an heir who could feasibly provide a new direction for the nation also diminished the long-term prospects for the continuation of the Brazilian monarchy. The emperor loved his daughter Isabel and respected her strong character. However, he considered the idea of a female successor as antithetical to the role required of Brazil's ruler. "Destiny had spoken in the loss of his two male heirs and the lack, after their death, of any more sons." That view was also shared by the political establishment, who continued to harbor reservations when it came to any thought of accepting a female ruler. Isabel's children were also discounted as heirs. Pedro II had not raised them as possible successors to the throne, but rather in hopes that they would become worthy citizens. The consensus was that a suitable successor "had to be a man", that is, a male of the Braganza line.

The emperor's great-grandmother, Maria I of Portugal, had been a queen regnant. However, she had been married to her uncle, Pedro III of Portugal who was a Braganza. This meant that her offspring would continue to belong to the House of Braganza. Emperor Pedro II was the last of the direct male line in Brazil descended from Dom Afonso I, first king of Portugal and founder, in 1139, of the dynasty which headed the Brazilian Empire. There were two other male Braganza's, albeit living abroad: Pedro II's half-brother Rodrigo Delfim Pereira and his cousin Miguel, Duke of Braganza. Both were barred from the line of succession, however. The former because he was an illegitimate son, and the latter because he was a foreigner and not a descendant of the first Brazilian Emperor, Pedro I. (Note: According to the Brazilian Imperial Constitution, Article 117: "His [Pedro I of Brazil's] legitimate descendancy shall succeed on the throne…" See Rodrigues 1863, p. 90.)

None of these issues bothered Isabel, who did not imagine herself taking on the position of monarch. Her public roles gave no indication of preparations for assuming a greater part in government. She seemed content in supporting her father's position and made no effort to assemble her own faction of supporters within the political establishment. Her views and beliefs held no attraction for disaffected politicians, so no independent movement formed to adopt her as champion. She "was content with the life of an aristocratic lady, devoting herself to family, religion, charitable works, theater, opera, painting and music." Her husband, the Count of Eu, was equally disliked. He was shy, humble and eschewed displays of pomp and luxury. Since his marriage to Isabel in 1864, his behavior was described as "exemplary". But the count's private virtues did not become a part of his public image. To those outside his immediate circle, he came to be characterized as a greedy foreign interloper. Baseless rumors of questionable business dealings also circulated, such as one which portrayed him as a Rio de Janeiro slumlord. The prospect of the Count becoming consort detracted from the prospect of Isabel becoming Empress. The couple offered "to Brazilians no alternative center of loyalty or competing vision of the monarchy".

A weary emperor who no longer cared for the throne, an heir who had no desire to assume the crown, discontent among ruling circles who were dismissive of the Imperial role in national affairs: all seemed to presage the monarchy's impending doom. Nevertheless, Pedro II was unconcerned that times and conditions were changing. After more than five decades on the throne, he had become complacent in a belief that the devotion and support of his subjects were immutable. Because of these factors, and the lack of an energetic response on the part of Pedro II, it has been argued that prime responsibility for the monarchy's overthrow rested with the emperor himself.

=== Republicanism ===
Republicanism—either support for a presidential or parliamentary republic—as an enduring political movement appeared in Brazil during December 1870 in Rio de Janeiro with the publishing of a manifesto signed by 57 people and with the creation of the Republican Club. It represented an "insignificant minority of scholars." There was no repudiation of or desire for eliminating slavery in the manifesto. In 1873, the Republican Party of São Paulo was created, and it affirmed that slavery would have to be resolved by the monarchist (Conservative and Liberal) parties. The reason was that many of the Republicans from São Paulo were themselves slave-owning farmers. The objective of most republicans was to wait until the death of Pedro II and by a plebiscite or other peaceful means, prevent Princess Isabel from ascending the throne. Republicanism did not envisage any "social readjustment" (such as improving the quality of life for former slaves), and they "were not revolutionaries in the deep meaning of the word." The republican movement "had a slow and irregular evolution, concentrated in the provinces south of Bahia"—more precisely in the provinces of São Paulo, Rio de Janeiro, Minas Gerais and Rio Grande do Sul.

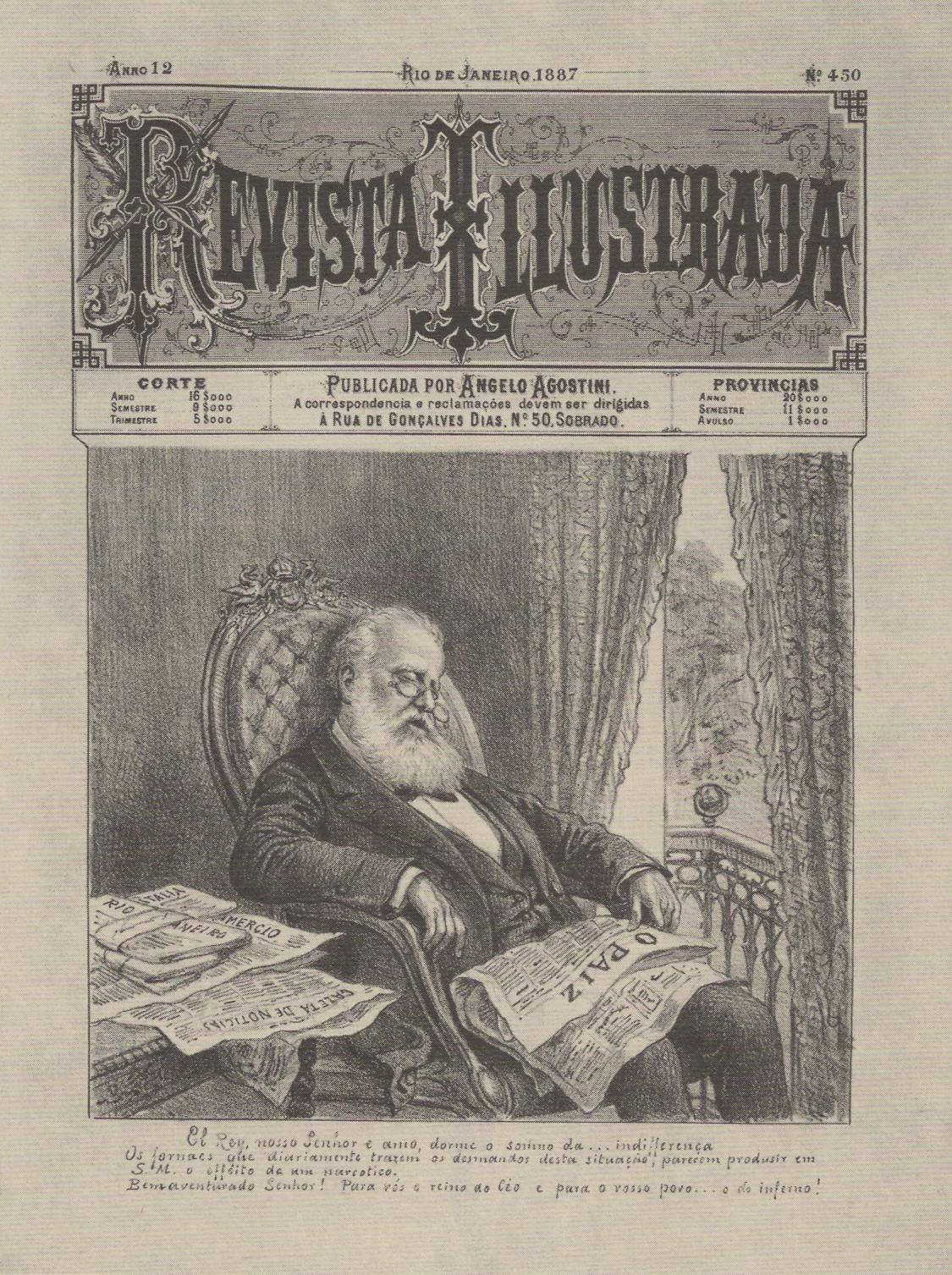
Caricature penciled by Angelo Agostini to Revista Illustrada mocking the lack of interest from Pedro II in politics by the end of his reign.

It was "an extremely small group" with a "precarious organization in the provinces" and no cohesion or connection among themselves. The only Republican faction to achieve political clout was the Republican Party of São Paulo, which managed to elect two deputies to the Chamber of Deputies in 1884, though none were elected to the Empire's last legislature in 1889. In the 1880s "it attracted sympathy in lesser numbers than [slavery] abolitionism, and at a slower pace." Its numbers only increased after 1888, adding new adherents consisting of farmers who had been slave owners and who perceived themselves victims of an unjust abolition of slavery that had not included any type of indemnity to them. Even so, in 1889 the "avowed republicans were probably a small minority" as the "republican ideals, in reality, had never managed to seduce the people. Its dissemination was restricted to the intellectual and military fields."

As "the republicans themselves recognized, the party did not have size, organization and popular support enough to overthrow the monarchy." Republicanism "did not manage, at any moment of its development, to spur the national soul. It never had the stature to provoke a strong enthusiasm or enlist all forces that were divorcing from the throne." Even with radical propaganda and little interference from the authorities, the Republican Party in existence from the beginning of the 1870s was a small one. It praised republics such as the United States, France and Argentina, while conveniently ignoring progressive monarchies such as the United Kingdom and the Scandinavian countries. In 1889, its members were "spokesmen in public squares and writers of periodicals. They were far from having the power to develop propaganda that could shake the foundations of the throne." In the "political process of the second empire [reign of Pedro II], the republican party had such a dull and secondary role that it might even have been forgotten; it was unable to influence rationales advocating the regime's dissolution." It was the crisis between the military and the Government, "of very diverse origin and evolution" from the republicanism, which was to prove the main factor in the fall of the monarchy.

Pedro II showed no interest in the Republican Manifesto of 1870. The Marquis of São Vicente, then President of the Council of Ministers, suggested to the emperor that republicans be forbidden to enter into public service, a practice then common in monarchies. Pedro II answered, "Mr. São Vicente, allow the nation to govern itself and decide whatever [monarchy or republic] they want." (Note: "Sr. São Vicente, o país que se governe como entender e dê razão a quem tiver.") The President reprimanded the monarch, "Your Majesty does not have a right to think in that way. The Monarchy is a constitutional doctrine which Your Majesty swore to maintain; it is not incarnate in the person of Your Majesty." But the Emperor did not care and simply answered: "Well, if the Brazilians do not want me as their Emperor, I shall become a teacher instead!"

The emperor not only always refused to forbid republicans from becoming public servants, but also hired the republican military officer Benjamin Constant as a professor of mathematics to his grandsons. He allowed open republican activities, including newspapers, assemblies, meetings and political parties, and exempted republican deputies elected to the Chamber of Deputies from swearing allegiance to the crown. The freedom of the Press, "one of the foundations of the regime, kept allowing fierce criticisms and vile caricatures opposing the regime and its public personalities." Pedro II was intransigent in his defense of the unrestricted freedom of speech which had existed in Brazil since independence in 1822. He was accused of being excessively tolerant towards the republicans, but "he did not pay attention to several warnings stating that his behavior undermined the political foundation of the monarchy." In 1889, Pedro II said to José Antonio Saraiva that he would not mind if Brazil became a republic. The "Emperor's indifference towards the fate of the regime was also one of the main factors in the fall of the Monarchy."

=== Military deterioration ===
A serious problem began to become evident during the 1880s. This was a weakening of discipline within Brazil's military. The older generation of officers were loyal to the monarchy, believed the military should be under civilian control, and had a great aversion to the militaristic caudillism against which they had earlier fought. But these elders were no longer in control, and many had since died, including the Duke of Caxias, the Count of Porto Alegre, the Marquis of Erval, and others. It was accepted that military officers could participate in politics while staying on active duty. However, most did so as members of the Conservative Party and Liberal Party. This meant that their political careers were apt to come into conflict with their duty as officers to act in subordination to the civilian government, which could be in the hands of their political opponents. Earlier involvement in politics by members of the military had not threatened the stability of Brazil's institutions, due to pervasive loyalty to the monarchy and constitution. The conflict of interest in mixing military and political spheres became more obvious and threatening as support for the constitutional establishment eroded among some elements within the military, although neither the emperor or government seem to have grasped the extent and implications of the increasing involvement of members of the military as political dissidents. Until this point Brazilians, both civilians and military, shared a sense of pride in the nation's political stability and for having avoided the caudillos, coups, military dictatorships and rebellions that characterized neighboring countries. Their perception of the superiority of the Brazilian political system was attributed to an established tradition of civilian control over the military. And the ministers who held the War and Navy portfolios in the cabinet were, with rare exceptions, civilians.

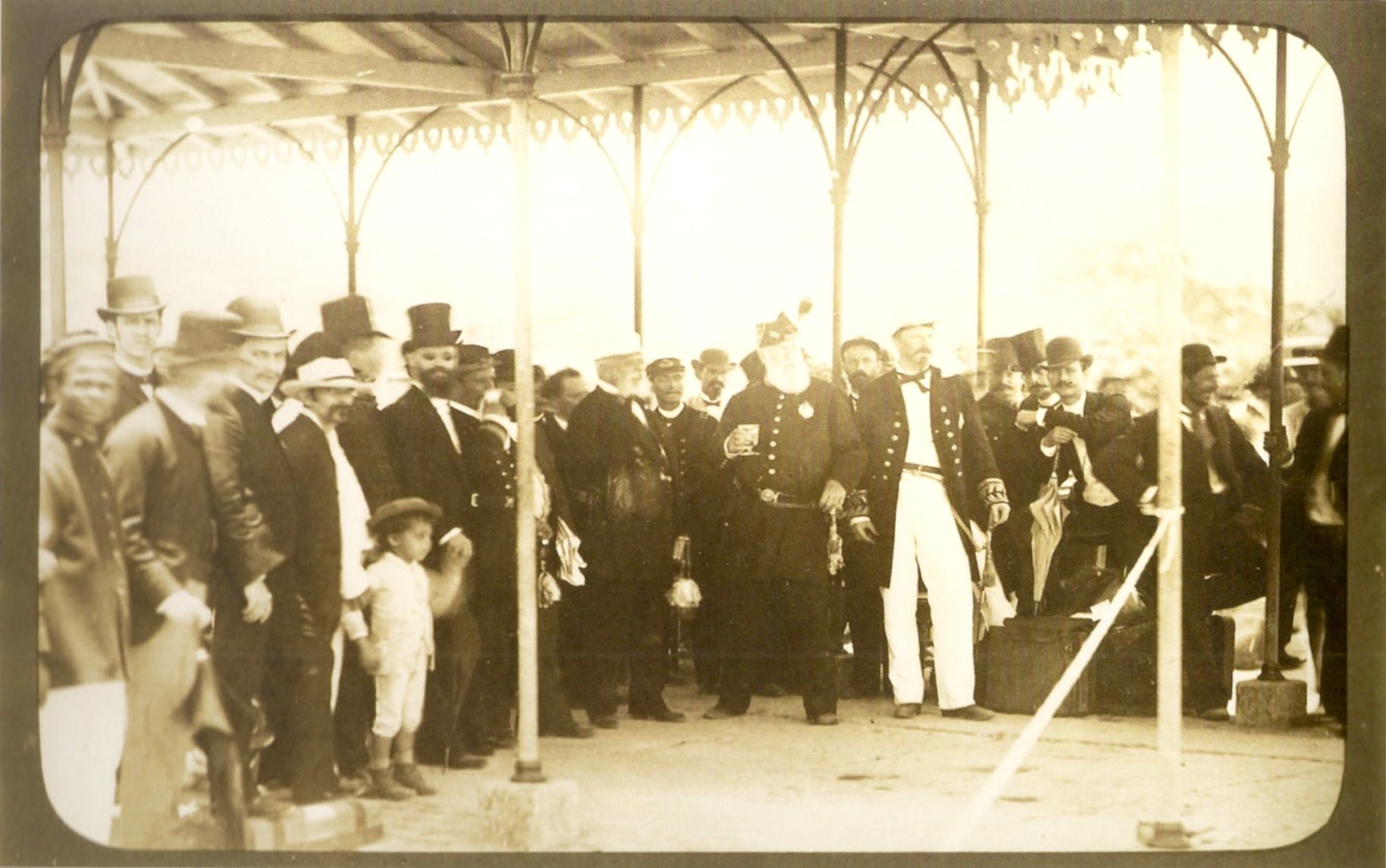
Pedro II (holding a cup and dressed in a campaign uniform of marshal of the army) next to his son-in-law Gaston d'Orléans, the count of Eu watching a demonstration of a newly acquired cannon to the Brazilian Army, 1886. At this point the deterioration of discipline among the corps had become evident.

1882 saw the first signs of insubordination among the army corps when a group of officers assassinated a journalist in broad daylight. He had published an article which they considered an offence to their honor. However, the participants were not subjected to punishment for this act. Records from 1884 show that, out of a peacetime army of 13,500 men, more than 7,526 had been jailed for insubordination. The military were badly paid, inadequately equipped, ill-instructed, and thinly spread across the vast empire, often in small "garrisons of 20, 10, 5 and even 2 men." Most of the non-officer corps consisted of men recruited from the poor sertão (hinterland) in the northeast, and later from former slaves. These were volunteers seeking some means of subsistence, as there was no conscription. They were completely unprepared for military life, and had little education or concept of civic responsibility and government. A poor Brazilian from the northeast viewed his military commanders in the same light as he viewed the henchmen of the political bosses at home. An ex-slave would see his harsh superior officer as differing little from his former owner and taskmasters. They had no means of understanding that they were being used to affect a coup, that their orders put them in rebellion against the emperor, or that their actions would lead to a dictatorship. The average recruit blindly followed orders and hoped to avoid punishment by his superiors for any mistake.

In 1886 a colonel renowned for lack of discipline published newspaper articles criticizing the Minister of War, an act of insubordination forbidden by law. Instead of being punished, the colonel was supported by his commander, Field Marshal Deodoro da Fonseca. The minister, as well as the conservative cabinet headed by João Maurício Wanderley, decided not to penalize the colonel in an attempt to quiet dissension. However, the cabinet went further and removed any constraint on military officers broadcasting their views. In consequence of this policy, subordinates were thenceforth able to publicly criticize their superiors, thus undermining both military and political authority, including that of the cabinet itself.

At the beginning of 1888 a drunken officer was arrested by the police for causing the disturbance in the street. Several officers, including Deodoro, were outraged by the arrest and insisted that the chief of police be dismissed. Wanderley, who was still heading the cabinet, refused to bow to this demand. But Princess Isabel, acting regent on behalf of her father who was in Europe, instead opted to dismiss the entire cabinet and support the so-called "undisciplined military faction". Her motive was to use this incident as a pretext to replace Wanderley, who was openly against the abolition of slavery, an issue before the Parliament at the time. Although she gained a new cabinet composed of politicians who supported the end of slavery, Isabel's decision held unintended and dire consequences for the monarchy. Instead of placating an unruly military faction, it only opened the way for more audacious demands and more widespread insubordination, while exposing the weakness of the civilian power. Several officers began to openly conspire against the government, expecting that in a republic they would no longer be exposed to the "harassment" which they believed they were suffering under the monarchy. One of them, Floriano Peixoto, advocated adoption of a "military dictatorship".

Another important influence which appeared during the 1880s was the dissemination of Positivism among the army's lower and medium officer ranks, as well as among some civilians. Brazilian Positivists believed that a republic was superior to a monarchy. However, they also saw representative democracy and freedom of speech as threats. They also opposed religions, especially Catholicism (though excepting Positivism itself). They advocated the establishment of a dictatorship, with a dictator-for-life who would name his own successor, along with a strong centralized government and "the incorporation of the proletariat into society through the end of bourgeois privileges." Positivism shared many features with later Bolshevism, Marxism and Leninism. However, and remarkably, the Positivists wanted Pedro II to assume the first dictatorship, and hoped to use him to smooth the transition from monarchy towards their new republic.

One of the most influential Positivists in Brazil was Lieutenant-colonel Benjamim Constant, a professor at the Military Academy. Although admired to the point of veneration by the young cadets, he was completely unknown to the public. Constant and other Positivist instructors inculcated students with his ideology. Gradually consigned to the background of the academy's curriculum were military exercises and military studies of Antoine-Henri Jomini and Colmar Freiherr von der Goltz, replaced by a focus on political discussions and readings from Auguste Comte and Pierre Lafitte. The cadets soon became insubordinate political agitators. Even so, Positivists still expected to make a peaceful transition to their fantasy of a republican dictatorship and Constant, who had also taught the emperor's grandsons, met with Pedro II and tried to convince him to join their cause. Unsurprisingly, given Pedro II's character, this proposal was steadfastly refused, and Constant began to believe that there was no remaining alternative to a coup d'état.

As a result, a coalition between the undisciplined Army faction headed by Deodoro and the Positivist faction headed by Constant was formed and directly led to the 15 November 1889 republican coup. According to one of the seditious leaders, only around 20% of the Brazilian army participated in or actively supported the monarchy's fall.

=== Third trip to Europe and end of slavery in Brazil ===
The Emperor's health had considerably worsened by 1887 and fever attacks had become common. His personal doctors suggested a trip to Europe for medical treatment. When embarking, he was greeted by a crowd which cried out, "Long live His Majesty the Emperor of Brazil!" He left on 30 June 1887 along with his wife and his grandson Pedro Augusto. Once more his daughter Isabel became regent in his place. He remained for a short time in Portugal and traveled on to Paris, where he stayed in the Grand Hotel as usual. There he received Louis Pasteur, Ambroise Thomas, Pierre Émile Levasseur, François Coppée, Alexandre Dumas, fils, Arsène Houssaye, Guerra Junqueiro, and two of Victor Hugo's grandsons, among others. In a conversation with Houssaye, the Emperor again lamented what he considered a "crown of thorns" he had to bear. Pedro II also saw his old friend Michel Eugène Chevreul, who was by then 102 years old.

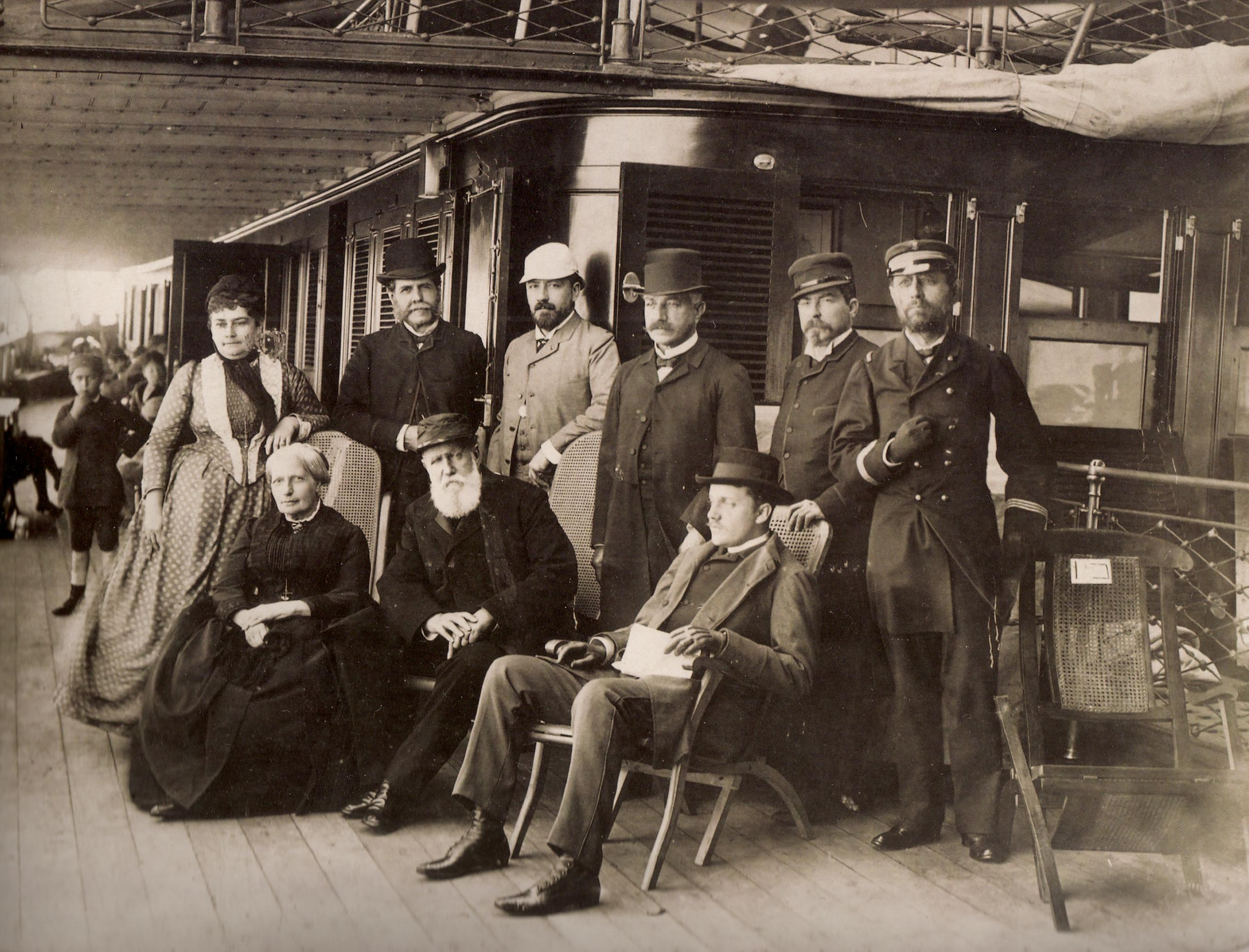
Pedro II departing to Europe in 1887. On his right is his wife and on his left, his elder grandson Pedro Augusto.

The monarch was examined by the French doctors Charles-Édouard Brown-Séquard, Jean-Martin Charcot and Michel Peter, who recommended a visit to the spas at Baden-Baden. He remained there for two months and met with old acquaintances, including Wilhelm I of Germany and Leopold II of Belgium. He also visited the tomb of his daughter Leopoldina in Coburg. He returned to Paris on 8 October 1887 and met his sisters Januária and Francisca. From there he traveled to Italy where he was invited by the King of Italy to a dinner along with Queen Victoria and Natalija Obrenović, Queen of Serbia. In Florence he unveiled the painting Independence or Death by the Brazilian painter Pedro Américo in the presence of Victoria, Obrenović and Charles I of Württemberg. In Milan he met with Cesare Cantù. There his health worsened on 3 May 1888, and he passed two weeks between life and death, even being anointed. Charcot came from Paris to assist and administered caffeine by intervenous injection, resulting in an improvement in the Emperor's health. On 22 May he received news that slavery had been abolished in Brazil by a law sanctioned by his daughter. Lying in bed with a weak voice and tears in his eyes, he said, "Great people! Great people!"

Pedro II returned to Brazil and disembarked in Rio de Janeiro on 22 August 1888. The "whole country welcomed him with an enthusiasm never seen before. From the capital, from the provinces, from everywhere, arrived proofs of affection and veneration. The emotion from those who saw him disembark, frail, thin, with bent body, weak legs, was one most profound." The cadets from the Military Academy climbed Sugarloaf Mountain and placed a gigantic banner on which was written "Hail." Such popular enthusiasm directed toward the Emperor was not matched even by the celebrations of his majority in 1840, in the Christie Affair of 1864, upon his departure to Rio Grande do Sul in 1865, or even after the victory in the Paraguayan War in 1870. "To judge from the general manifestations of affection that the Emperor and the Empress had received on the occasion of their arrival from Europe, in this winter of 1888, no political institution seemed to be so strong as the monarchy in Brazil." Even former slaves displayed loyalty towards the monarchy and vehemently opposed the republicans, whom they called "the Paulistas." The "monarchy seemed to be at the height of its popularity." Pedro II had reached the pinnacle of his prestige among Brazilians.

== Fall ==
=== The last year ===
1889 seemed to have begun well for both the monarchy and Brazil. During a three-month tour of the northeast and north, the enthusiastic reception given the Count of Eu "demonstrated that monarchism remained powerful there". Although an assassination attempt on Pedro II's life was made in mid-July by a Portuguese immigrant, this was widely condemned, even by the small republican factions. In late July, the Emperor traveled to Minas Gerais, demonstrating both that he was still actively engaged and the depth of support for the monarch in the province. Along with the successful appearances made by Eu and Isabel in São Paulo, Paraná, Santa Catarina, and Rio Grande do Sul provinces from November 1884 to March 1885, there was every indication of broad backing for the monarchy among the Brazilian population.

The nation gained great international prestige during the final years of the Empire. Predictions of economic and labor disruption caused by the abolition of slavery failed to materialize and the 1888 coffee harvest was successful, both of which boosted Princess Isabel's popularity. José do Patrocínio, a "leading abolitionist journalist, an inveterate republican notable for his disrespect for the Imperial Family, not only renounced his former views" but also "took a leading role in organizing a 'Black Guard'." This was an association of former slaves dedicated to the monarchy's defense, and which also harassed republican meetings.

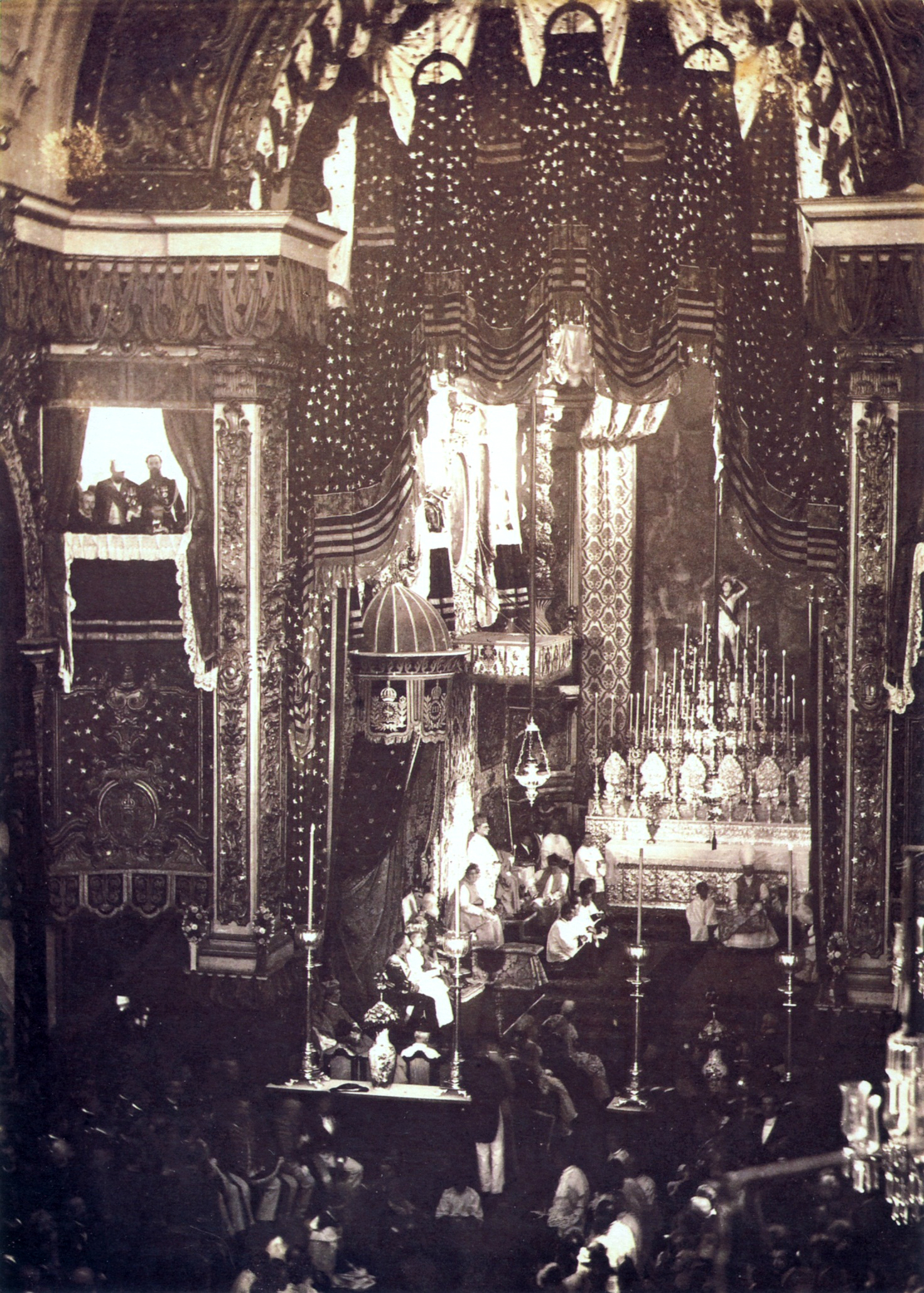
Acclamation of Princess Isabel as regent in 1887. One of the rare solemn events during the last years of the Empire. For almost a decade Pedro II had been sabotaging the monarchy and his daughter's prospects of succession.

The cabinet responsible for enacting the law abolishing slavery suffered a vote of no confidence on 3 May 1889 and was forced to resign. Pedro II called José Antônio Saraiva to form a new cabinet. Saraiva, a highly pragmatic politician, cared neither for monarchy nor republic, so long as he held power. He frankly warned the Emperor that Isabel had little chance of reigning as empress and that the government itself should take an active role in facilitating a peaceful transition to a republic. The Emperor accepted this proposal, without bothering to inform his daughter and heiress. Pedro II's behavior in this meeting revealed how little commitment he had to the monarchy. He gave little consideration to his daughter's opinion, or that of the Brazilian people who overwhelmingly supported the imperial system. The reason, unknown to but a very few, was that Pedro II was very sympathetic towards the idea of a republican system. (Note: Pedro II wrote to the countess of Barral in January 1880: "The situation of a monarch is difficult in this period of transition. Very few nations are prepared for the system of government which is in train, and I certainly would be better and happier as president of a republic than as constitutional emperor. I am not fooling myself; but I will not fail to carry out, as I have until now, my duties as constitutional monarch." This was followed by Barral's reply in April 1880: "It appears to me that we will soon have another republic in South America. -I know Y. M. [Your Majesty] does not care about yourself, but it is your duty to sustain your dynasty and to ensure that the person of the sovereign is respected." Written in 1880, when the Brazilian Empire seemed strong as ever, the exchange reveals that Pedro II had long been undermining the foundations of the monarchy. See Barman 1999, p. 308.) Through action and inaction, consciously and unconsciously, he had been sabotaging both the monarchy and the prospects of his daughter's future reign for nearly a decade. A quite astonished historian Heitor Lyra remarked: "Was he not the head of the Brazilian monarchy, it would be said that he had been allied with the Republic's advertisers!" Saraiva, however, changed his mind and declined the office. Pedro II instead appointed Afonso Celso de Assis Figuereido, viscount of Ouro Preto, in his place.

Unlike Saraiva, Ouro Preto was a staunch monarchist who was determined to save the regime at any cost. His program of reforms was highly ambitious and aimed at resolving festering issues about which politicians had long been complaining. An item notably missing from his agenda was any move to address the military indiscipline and the urgent necessity of restoration of government authority over the corps. This would prove to be a fatal mistake. Among the reforms proposed were the expanding of voting rights by abolishing the income requisite, the end of lifelong senate tenures and, most important of all, increased decentralization which would turn the country into a full federation by allowing the election of town mayors and provincial presidents (governors).

The end of slavery had resulted in an explicit shift of support to republicanism by rich and powerful coffee farmers who held great political, economic and social power in the country. The Republican faction also attracted others disaffected by the liberation of slaves, which they regarded as confiscation of their personal property. "Traditionalists to the core, long the backbone of the monarchism, they viewed the regent's action as the grossest betrayal of their long loyalty. What attracted the planters to the republicanism beside its opposition to monarchy was the movement's promise of indemnification for the lost slaves […] Republicanism for this group was less a creed than a weapon."

To avert a republican backlash, Ouro Preto exploited the ready credit available to Brazil as a result of its prosperity. He made available massive loans at favorable interest rates to plantation owners and lavishly granted titles and lesser honors to curry favor with influential political figures who had become disaffected. He also indirectly began to address the problem of the recalcitrant military by revitalizing the moribund National Guard, by then an entity which existed mostly only on paper. As the Count of Nioac, a noted politician, remarked: "I call your attention especially to the reorganization of the National Guard, in order to possess this force with which in past times the government suppressed military revolts. If we had had the National Guard reorganized, the Deodoros and other ignorant military men would have been quiet." Pedro II also asked Salvador Mendonça, who was leaving to the U.S. to represent Brazil at the First International Conference of American States, to carefully study the U.S. Supreme Court with the goal of creating a similar tribunal in Brazil and transferring his constitutional prerogatives to it. This would have made the monarch a mere figurehead. It is not known if he intended to constrain his daughter's powers as empress and make her thus more palatable to the politicians, or whether he had something else in mind.

The reforms proposed by the government alarmed republican and seditious factions in the military corps. The republicans saw that Ouro Preto's plans would undercut support for their own aims, and were emboldened to further action. The reorganization of the National Guard was begun by the cabinet in August 1889, and the creation of a rival militia caused the dissidents among the officer corps to consider desperate steps. For both groups, republicans and military, it had become a case of "now or never". Although there was no desire in Brazil among the majority of the population to change the form of government, (Note: "Não havia, portanto, clamor pela mudança do regime de governo, exceto alguns gritos de 'Viva a República', entoados por pequenos grupos de militantes à espreita da passagem da carruagem imperial." —Ermakoff in Ermakoff 2006, p. 189.) republicans began pressuring the rebellious faction to overthrow the monarchy.

On 9 November 1889, a large number of officers gathered in the Military Club and decided to stage a coup d'état aimed at the overthrow of the monarchy. Two days later in the house of Rui Barbosa a plan to execute the coup was drawn up by officers who included Benjamin Constant and Marshal Deodoro da Fonseca, plus two civilians: Quintino Bocaiuva and Aristides Lobo. It was the only significant meeting in which civilian republicans participated, as Deodoro wished to exclude them from what he considered to be a strictly military matter. Deodoro still hesitated: "I wanted to follow the Emperor's coffin, who is old and whom I deeply respect." But he eventually yielded to pressure: "He [Benjamin Constant] wants it thus, let us make the Republic. Benjamin and I will take care of the military action; Mr. Quintino and his friends will organize everything else."

=== Republican coup ===
At 11 p.m. on 14 November, Deodoro took command of 600 men, the majority of whom either had no idea of what was occurring or believed that they were organizing a defence against the National Guard or the Black Guard. A few republicans yelled "Hail to the Republic" but Deodoro ordered them to be silent.

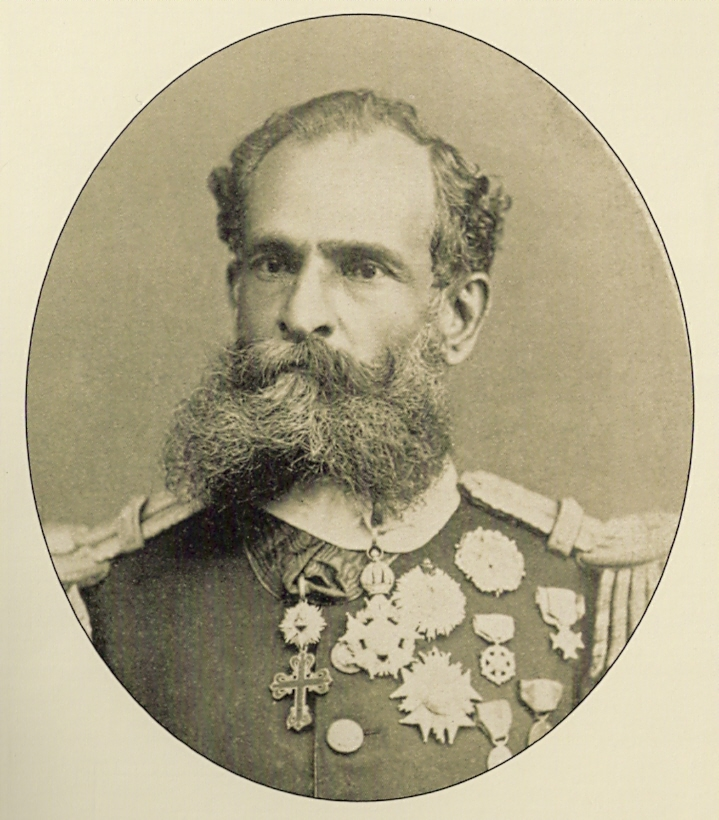
Marshal Manuel Deodoro da Fonseca, leader of the Republicans.

Upon learning of the revolt, the Viscount of Ouro Preto and the other Cabinet ministers went to Army Headquarters, located at the Field of Santana in the heart of the capital. The supposedly loyal troops there outnumbered and were better equipped than the rebel force. The adjutant-general (Commander) of the Army, Field Marshal Floriano Peixoto guaranteed his men's loyalty to Ouro Preto, but he was secretly in alliance with the rebels. Floriano and the Minister of the War Rufino Enéias, Viscount of Maracajú (a cousin of Deodoro) ignored repeated orders from Ouro Preto to attack the rebels who were approaching the headquarters. He tried to convince them, recalling the acts of bravery by the Brazilian military in the Paraguayan War. But Floriano replied to him "in front of us there were enemies, and here we are all Brazilians", which finally brought him to a realization of how far the mutiny had spread among the officer corps.

The ostensibly loyal troops opened the headquarters gates to Deodoro, who cried out: "Long live His Majesty the Emperor!" He met with Ouro Preto, and undertook to personally present the Emperor with a list of the names of those to be included in a new cabinet. To the disillusionment of civilian and military republicans, Deodoro did not proclaim a republic, and it seemed that he would only topple the cabinet. He was unsure whether he wanted to act against Pedro II, and the rebels themselves did not believe the coup would succeed. The few people who witnessed what occurred did not realize that it was a rebellion, and according to the republican Aristides Lobo, the populace was "stunned". "Rarely has a revolution been so minor."

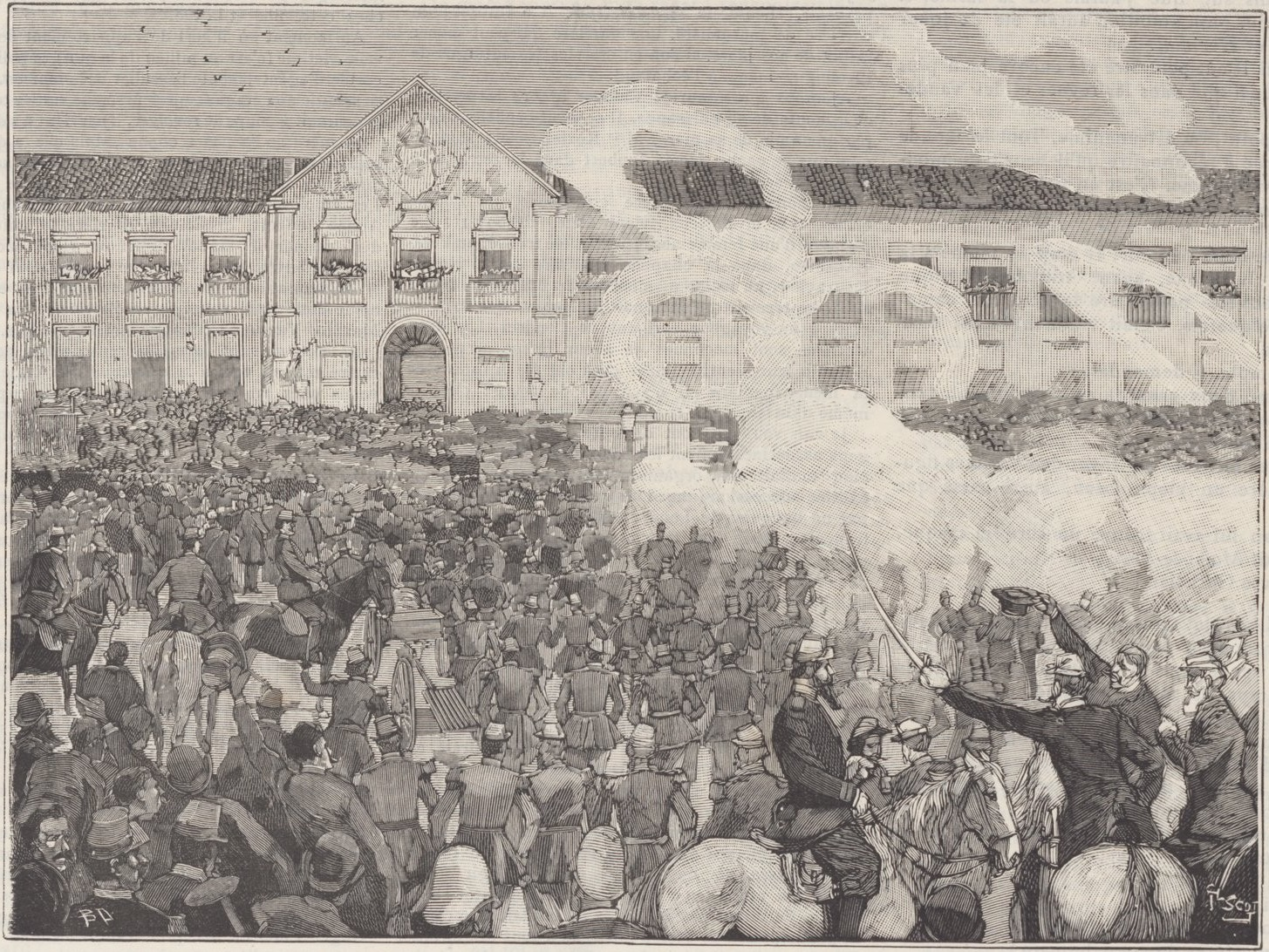
The Proclamation of the Republic in Rio de Janeiro (Drawing by Georges Scott, published at Le Monde Illustré, 1889).

On the morning of 15 November, Pedro II was in Petrópolis when he received the first telegram from Ouro Preto informing him of the rebellion. However, he did not assign much import to the news. At 11 a.m. as he left a mass in honor of the 45th anniversary of his sister Maria II's death, the monarch received a second telegram and decided to return to Rio de Janeiro. His wife expressed concern, but he told her, "On what ma'am? When I arrive there it will be over!" He travelled by train, reading periodicals and scientific magazines. Not imagining the gravity of the situation, he arrived at the city palace at 3 p.m. André Rebouças suggested that he go to the countryside to organize resistance. The Marquis of Tamandaré asked for his permission to lead the Armada (navy) and suppress the rebellion. He dismissed all the ideas put forward and said, "This is nothing. I know my countrymen." The Emperor asked the Conservative senator Manuel Francisco Correia what he thought of the situation. Correia answered that he believed that it was the end of the monarchy. Pedro II showed no emotion, as if unconcerned about the possibility.

Ouro Preto arrived at the palace at 4 p.m and suggested that Pedro II nominate senator Gaspar da Silveira Martins, who would arrive in the city two days later, as the new president. Deodoro avoided meeting personally with Pedro II, but once he heard that the Emperor had chosen a personal enemy of his for the office, he finally decided on the inauguration of the Republic. The recently elected Chamber of Deputies was only to be called into session on 20 November, and the Senate was in recess. For this reason, Princess Isabel insisted that her father convoke the Council of State to deal with the situation. But she was given the reply, "Later on." The princess, on her own initiative, called the council members. The Council assembled at 11 p.m, and after two hours recommended that the Emperor appoint Antônio Saraiva instead of Silveira Martins. After accepting the office, this politician sent an emissary to negotiate with Deodoro. But Deodoro responded that it was too late to change his mind. Upon hearing the reply, Pedro II commented, "If it is so, it will be my retirement. I have worked too hard and I am tired. I will go rest then."

=== Departure to exile ===
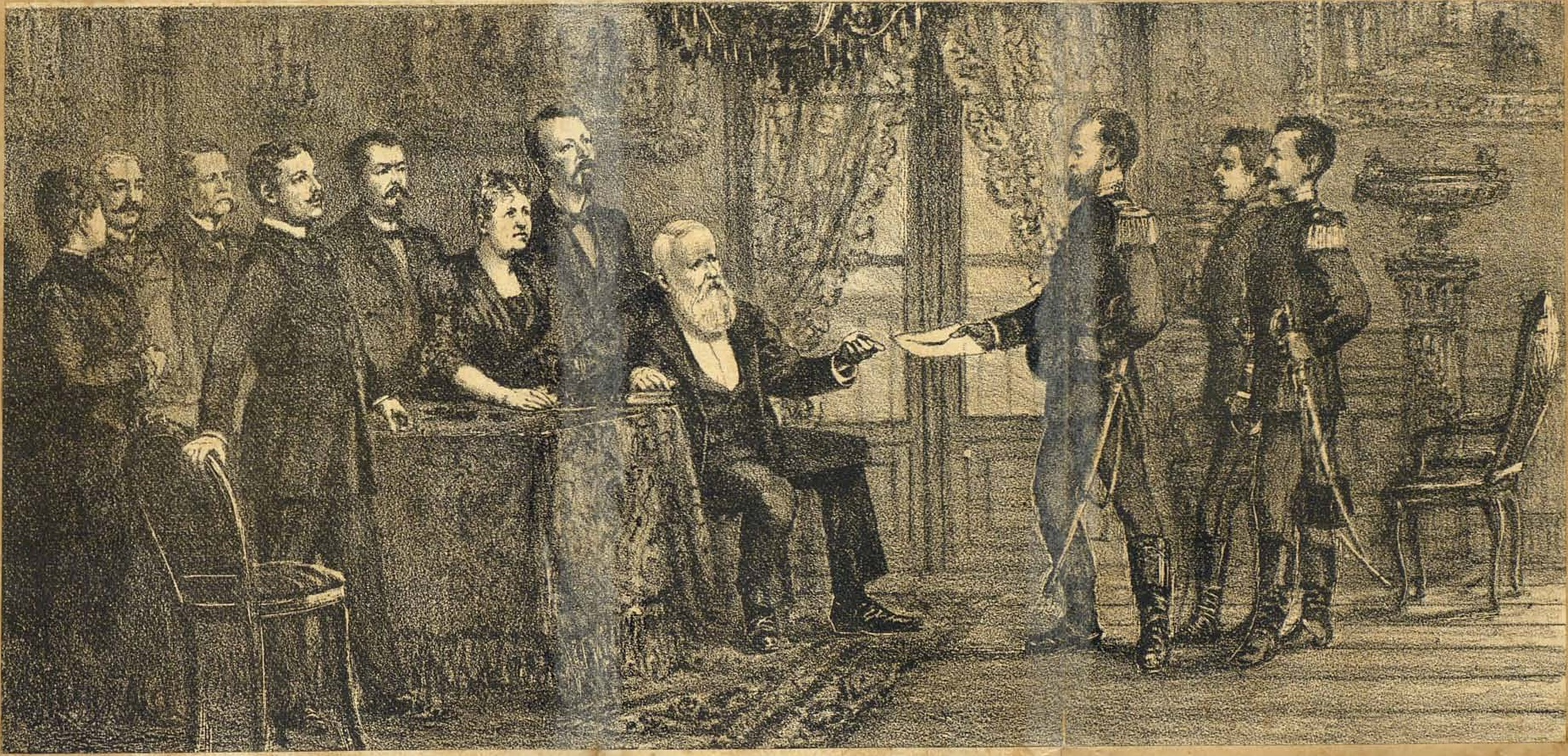
Message delivered to Pedro II by Major Solón on 6 November 1889.

On Saturday 16 November, the Imperial Family were confined in the palace, surrounded by a cavalry regiment. Pedro II continued reading scientific magazines and appeared calm throughout the day. At 3 p.m, Major Frederico Solón Sampaio Ribeiro informed the Imperial Family that the Republic had been proclaimed and that they must leave the country for exile within 24 hours. The "republicans had no courage to meet the Emperor, whom they secretly admired, face to face" and therefore sent low-ranking officers to communicate with him. Solón, when complimenting the Emperor, called him first "Your Excellency", then "Your Highness" and lastly "Your Majesty". Although clearly deposed, the Emperor was still much respected by those around him, as illustrated by the parley between him and Solón. (Note: Solón: "I come on behalf of the Provisional Government, to respectfully deliver to Your Majesty this message. Does Your Majesty have a reply to give?" The Emperor: "Not at the moment." Solón: "May I withdraw, then?" The Emperor: "Yes.") The notice of banishment caused the women to weep, while the men struggled to remain calm—with the exception of Pedro II, who remained impassive. The monarch resolved to travel the afternoon of the following day and sent a written message to the Provisional Government stating that he agreed to leave the country.

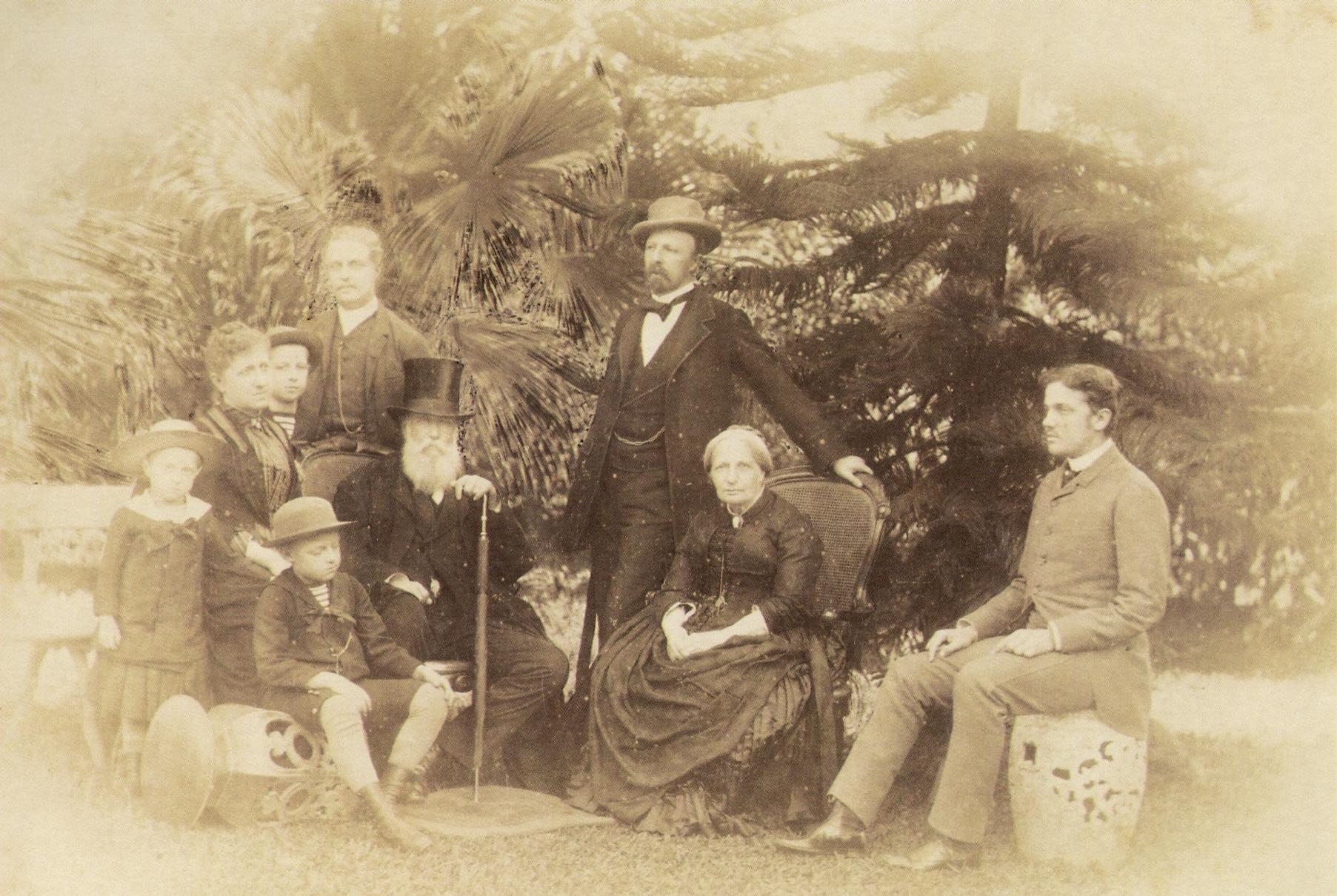
The Brazilian Imperial Family in 1887. From left to right: Antonio, Isabel, Pedro, Luís (seated), Augusto, Pedro II, Gaston, Teresa Cristina and Pedro Augusto.

The republican Government feared that demonstrations in favor of the Emperor might erupt on Monday 17 November. Lieutenant Colonel João Nepomuceno de Medeiros Mallet was sent at dawn to inform the Imperial Family that it must leave immediately. A commotion arose among those present until Pedro II himself appeared in the room. Mallet respectfully told him that the Government had asked them to depart at once. The Emperor refused to leave immediately, (Note: The Emperor: "What is this? So I will have to embark at this hour of the night?" Mallet respectfully told him that the Government asked them to depart immediately. The Emperor: "What Government?" Mallet: "The Government of the Republic." The Emperor: "Is Deodoro involved in this?" Mallet: "Yes, Sire. He is the Head of the Government." Pedro II: "You are all off your heads!") claiming that he was not a slave trying to escape in the middle of the night. (Note: "Não sou nenhum fugido, não sou nenhum fugido!" —Lyra in Lyra 1977, Vol 3, p. 114.) (Note: "Não sou negro fugido. Não embarco nesta hora!" —Calmon in Calmon 1975, p. 1626.) Mallet tried to persuade him, alleging that republican students would launch violent demonstrations against him. The Emperor seemed skeptical: "Who gives credence to students?" At that moment, shots were heard outside. Mallet left the palace to find out what had happened. Fifteen Imperial sailors had attempted to land in support of the Emperor but were overpowered and imprisoned by republican troops. Mallet returned to the building and deceived Pedro II by saying that militant Republicans had tried to attack him and his family. Astonished, the Emperor agreed to leave.

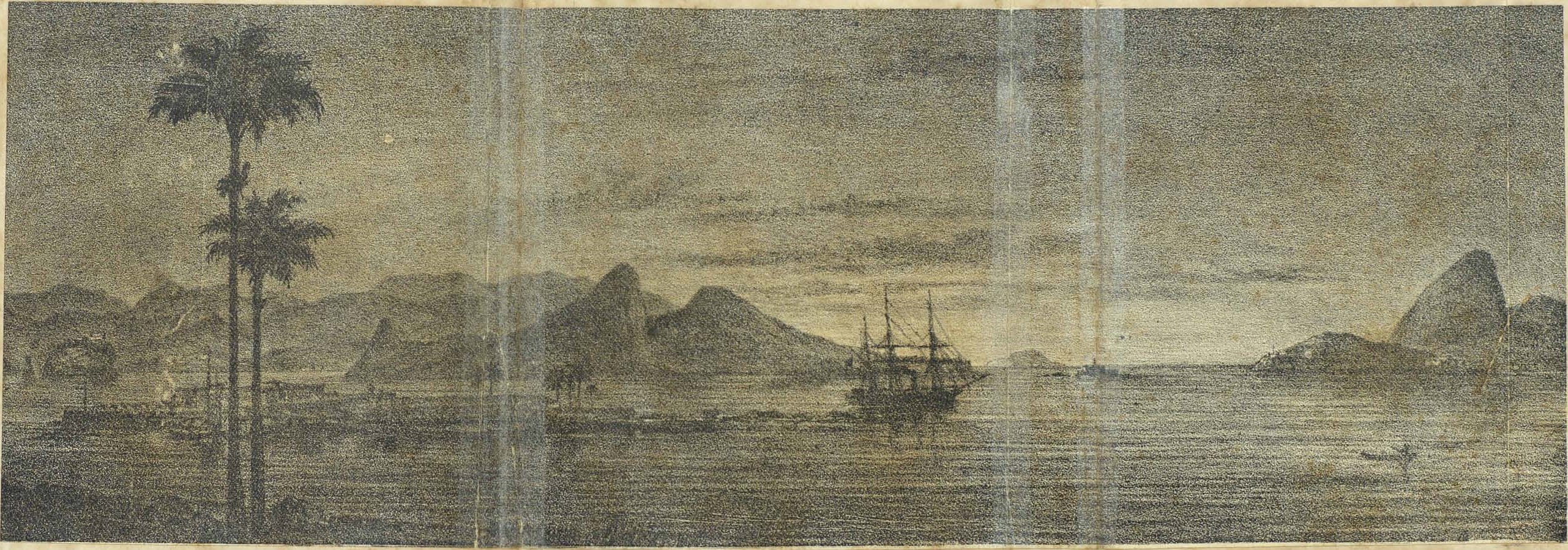
Departure to the exile of the Imperial Family on 17 November 1889, on the Alagoas steam.

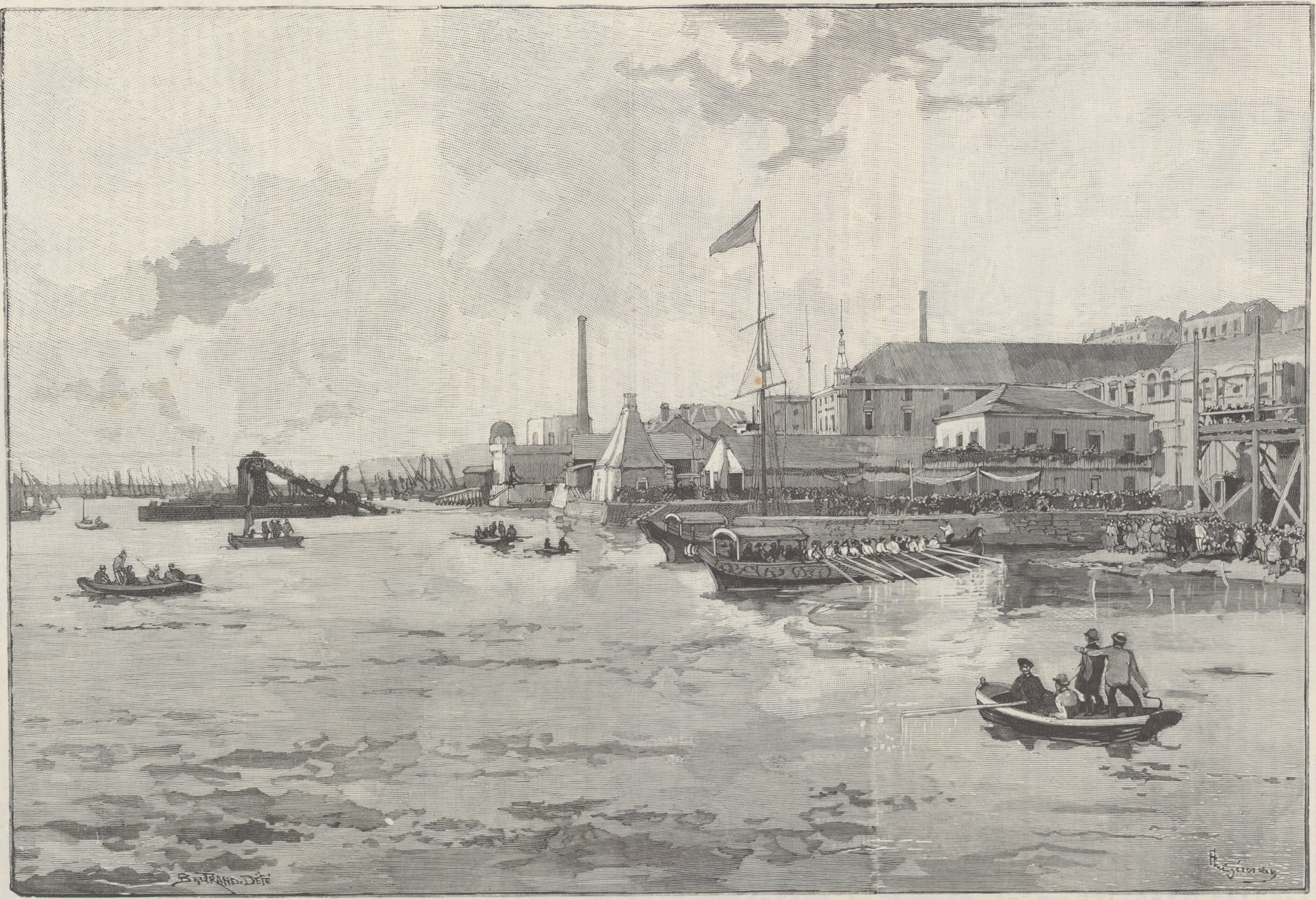
Landing of Dom Pedro on Lisbon: The imperial boat approaching the Navy's Arsenal (Le Monde Illustré, 1889).

When Pedro II left the palace, the soldiers who were standing guard outside instinctively presented arms, and he responded by raising his hat. A few close friends voluntarily accompanied the Imperial Family into exile, including André Rebouças and Franklin Dória, baron of Loreto. Very few were on hand to witness the departure. They were taken to the steamship Parnaíba and after that to the ship Alagoas, in which they sailed the next day to Europe. Before the final departure, Pedro II sent a short message to his faithful friend the Marquess of Tamandaré, who had remained at his side until embarkation: "What is done, is done. It remains to all of you to establish order and to consolidate your institutions." After learning that the Emperor had left, Benjamin Constant spoke: "It is fulfilled, the most painful of our duties." Major Carlos Nunes de Aguiar later recalled saying to Rui Barbosa, who had been at his side witnessing the departure from afar: "You were right to weep when the Emperor left." Historian Lilia Moritz Schwarcz said that it was "the end of the monarchy, but not of myth, called d. Pedro."

The government headed by Deodoro "was little more than a military dictatorship. The army dominated affairs both in Rio de Janeiro and in the states. Freedom of the press disappeared and elections were controlled by those in power." The republican regime which followed the overthrow of the monarchy revealed itself to be highly unstable. In "a little more than a century of existence, the Brazilian Republic faced twelve states of emergency, seventeen Institutional Acts, the National Congress dissolved six times, nineteen military revolutions, two presidential resignations, three presidents prevented from assuming office, four presidents deposed, seven different Constitutions, four dictatorships, and nine authoritarian governments."
