= Aristides Lobo =

Brazilian politician (1838–1896)

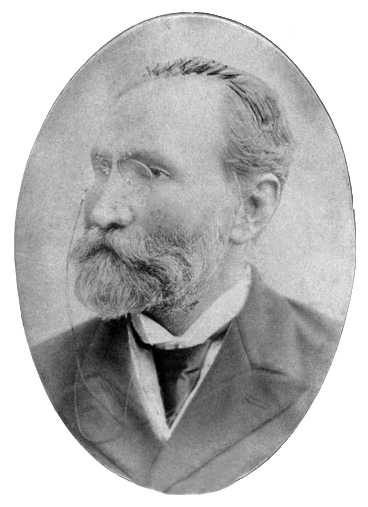
- Born: 12 February 1838; Cruz do Espírito Santo, Paraíba, Empire of Brazil
- Died: 23 July 1896 (aged 58); Barbacena, Minas Gerais, Brazil
- Education: Faculty of Law of Recife

Aristides da Silveira Lobo (12 February 1838 – 23 July 1896) was a Brazilian lawyer, politician, and journalist. An advocate of both the abolitionist and the republican causes, he served as federal deputy from 1864 to 1870 and as senator from 1892 to 1896, as well as Minister of the Interior from 1889 to 1890.

== Biography ==
Born in Cruz do Espírito Santo on a sugar plantation, Lobo was the grandson of Francisco José da Silveira, a revolutionary sentenced to death in the Pernambuco Revolution of 1817, and the son of politician Manuel Lobo de Miranda Henriques (pt). He was raised in the state of Alagoas and completed his secondary education at the Colégio da Paraíba, later graduating from the Faculty of Law of Recife.

Lobo worked as a public prosecutor and as a judge before initiating his political career as a federal deputy for Alagoas, running with the Liberal Party. In 1870, together with friends Salvador de Mendonça and Lafayette Coutinho, he founded the newspaper A República. The same year, along with other radical dissidents of the Liberal Party, he signed the Republican Manifesto, which urged for the dethroning of the Monarchy.

Lobo became a fervent propagandist of the republican movement. He was directly involved with planning the coup d'état that deposed emperor Pedro II. His account of the event, published on November 18 in the newspaper Diário Popular, would become emblematic

The people witnessed [the Proclamation] bewildered, astonished, surprised, without comprehending what it meant. Many believed they were watching a parade.

Following the establishment of the Republic, Lobo was appointed Minister of the Interior, but soon left office due to disagreements with President Deodoro da Fonseca. As a federal deputy, he participated in the Constituent Assembly that drafted the Constitution of 1891.

He translated Rabelais' Gargantua into Portuguese.
