= Luís Henrique Ferreira de Aguiar =

Brazilian 19th century diplomat

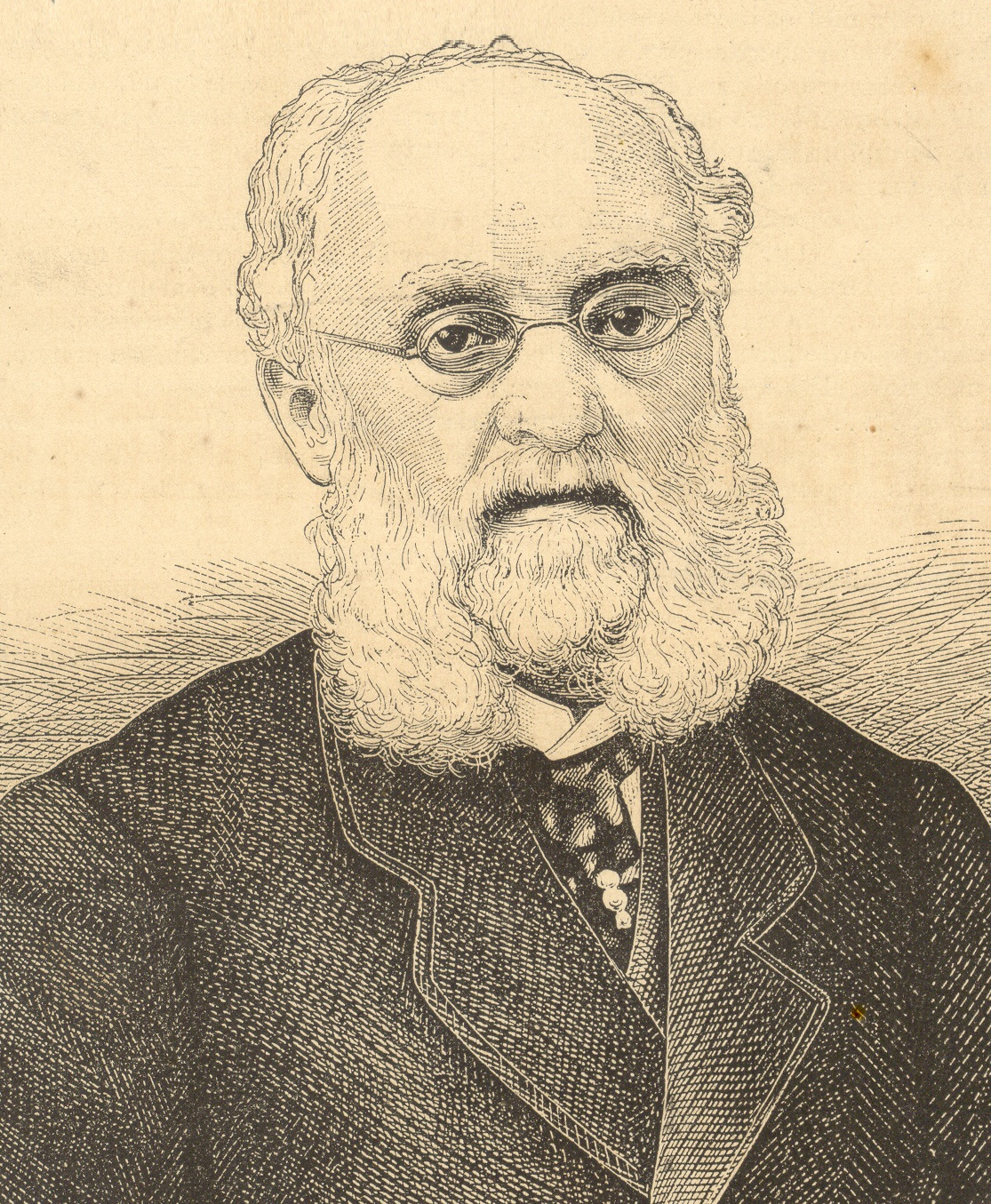
- Portrait of Mr. Aguiar, c. 1875

Consul general of the Empire of Brazil to the United States
- In office April 1842 – August 1875
- Preceded by: Dionisio de Azevedo Peçanha
- Succeeded by: Salvador de Mendonça

Personal details
- Born: 8 October 1812 Rio de Janeiro
- Died: 6 August 1875 (aged 62) New York City
- Spouse: Emeline Wilke (m. 1839)

Luís Henrique Ferreira de Aguiar (October 8, 1812 in Rio de Janeiro – August 6, 1875 in New York City) was the consul general of the Empire of Brazil in the United States from 1842 until his death.

With his appointment as attaché first class in the United States, he entered the Brazilian foreign service on November 28, 1837. On April 16, 1841, he was charged with the Consulate General of the Empire of Brazil in the United States, established in New York, and on April 12 of the following year he was appointed consul general. Aguiar was absent from the post between March 10, 1852, and November 14, 1854, when he was temporarily replaced by Antonino José de Miranda Falcão.

He was reportedly esteemed by President Lincoln and by Secretário de Estado Seward, having dealt with the latter in matters related to US ships in Brazilian harbors during the American Civil War.

Aguiar was commander of the Order of the Rose and knight of the Order of Christ, knight of the Order of Conceição of Portugal and member of various geographical societies.

== Private life ==
In 1839 he married Emeline Wilke, who died a few years later, leaving two children.

He died in New York after a long illness and was buried at Calvary Cemetery, in Queens.
