= Benjamin Constant (military) =

Brazilian military officer and positivist political thinker

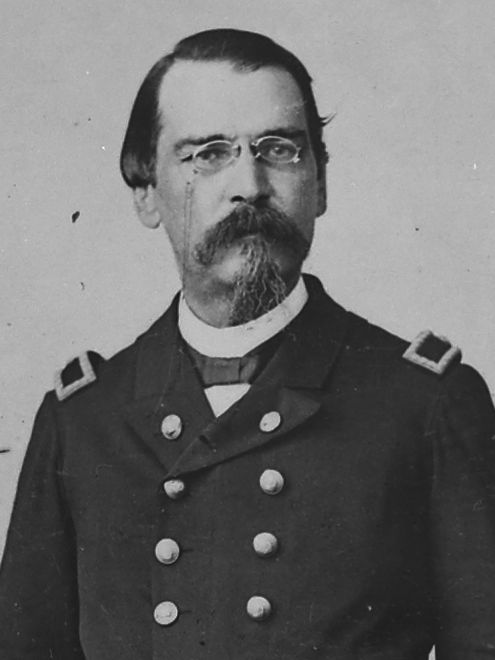

Secretary of State of Public Instruction, Posts and Telegraphs
- In office 19 April 1890 – 21 January 1891
- President: Deodoro da Fonseca
- Preceded by: Office established
- Succeeded by: João Barbalho (acting)

Minister of War
- In office 15 November 1889 – 12 March 1890
- President: Deodoro da Fonseca
- Preceded by: Viscount of Maracaju
- Succeeded by: Floriano Peixoto

Personal details
- Born: 18 October 1836 Niterói, Rio de Janeiro, Empire of Brazil
- Died: 22 January 1891 (aged 54) Rio de Janeiro, Neutral Municipality, Brazil
- Party: Republican
- Spouse: Maria Joaquina Bittencourt Costa (m. 1863)
- Children: 8
- Parents: Leopoldo Henrique Botelho de Magalhães (father); Bernardina Joaquina da Silva Guimarães (mother)
- Education: Praia Vermelha Military School

Military service
- Allegiance: Empire of Brazil (until 1889); United States of Brazil
- Branch/service: Imperial Brazilian Army; Brazilian Army
- Years of service: 1852–1891
- Rank: Lieutenant colonel
- Battles/wars: Paraguayan War

Benjamin Constant Botelho de Magalhães (18 October 1836 – 22 January 1891) was a Brazilian military officer and political thinker. Primarily a positivist, influenced heavily by Auguste Comte, he was the founder of the positivist movement in Brazil (Sociedade Positivista do Brasil, Brazilian Positivist Society), and later this led to his republican views. He left the Brazilian Positivist Society because of internal disagreements, but remained an ardent pupil of Comte until the end of his life.

Benjamin Constant was born in Niterói. He had a difficult childhood and attempted suicide at the age of 12. He served in the Paraguayan War, and had a large family. He felt underpaid and unhappy as a soldier. An intellectual at heart, he was a great supporter of Comte's Religion of Humanity.

His republican views led him to found the Clube Militar (or Military Club), with future president Deodoro da Fonseca, in May 1887. It was based in the Praia Vermelha Military School, and, shortly before his death, helped to organize a coup to overthrow Emperor Pedro II and establish a republic.

The Brazilian town of Benjamin Constant, Amazonas, near the Amazon River and the Peruvian border, was named after him.

He was considered the founder of the Republic in the Constitution of 1891, having died earlier the same year in Rio de Janeiro, aged 54.

== See also ==
- Benjamin Constant (Brazilian training ship)
