= Republican Manifesto =

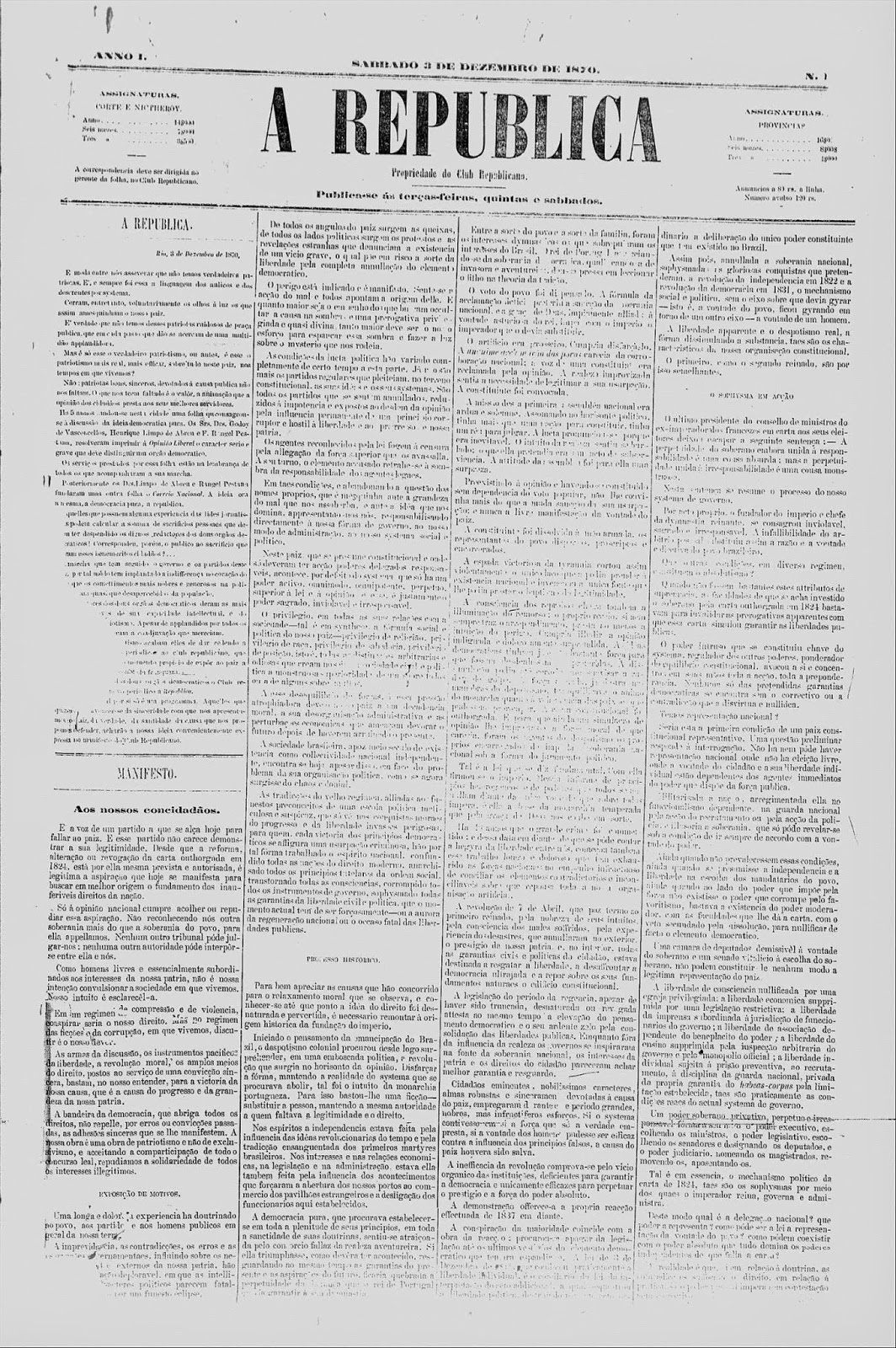
- Front page of the newspaper A Republica containing the manifesto
- Created: 3 December 1870
- Location: Rio de Janeiro, Empire of Brazil
- Author(s): Quintino Bocaiuva; Saldanha Marinho; Salvador de Mendonça
- Signatories: 58
- Purpose: Promote republican ideals in Brazil

In the history of Brazil, the Republican Manifesto was a political declaration published on 3 December 1870 in the first issue of the newspaper A Republica in Rio de Janeiro, then the capital of the Empire of Brazil. It advocated for the peaceful replacement of the Brazilian monarchy with a federal republic based on popular sovereignty and the autonomy of the provinces. The document was drafted by Quintino Bocaiuva, Saldanha Marinho and Salvador de Mendonça within the Republican Club—founded by radical dissidents from the Liberal Party and other proponents of republicanism—sparking the organized republican movement in late 19th-century Brazil that preceded the Proclamation of the Republic in 1889. It had 58 signatories, most of whom were part of Brazil's intellectual elite and the middle strata of society.

The manifesto had a major impact at the time, harshly criticizing the imperial government and what its creators perceived as the privileges—based on religion, race, and social standing—that permeated 19th-century Brazilian society, as well as the Moderating Power. It also traced the historical evolution of republican and democratic ideals in Brazil, which it dated back to the Minas Gerais Conspiracy of 1789.
