= Salvador de Mendonça =

Brazilian journalist, lawyer, diplomat and writer

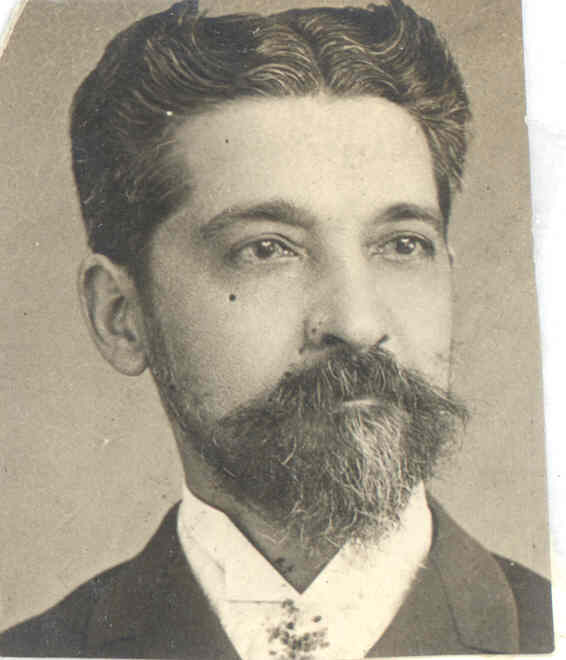
Salvador de Menezes Drummond Furtado de Mendonça

Salvador de Menezes Drummond Furtado de Mendonça (Itaboraí, July 21, 1841 – Rio de Janeiro, December 5, 1913), known as Salvador de Mendonça, was a Brazilian lawyer, journalist, diplomat and writer. He was one of the founders of the Brazilian Academy of Letters and of the Republican Movement in Brazil.

After being appointed Consul of Brazil in Baltimore in 1875, Mendonça was made the following year consul general of the Brazilian Empire in the United States, with residence in New York City. After serving in that position for 14 years, in 1890 he was appointed minister plenipotentiary of Brazil to the U.S.

Preceded by Joaquim Manuel de Macedo (patron)	Brazilian Academy of Letters - Founder of the 20th chair 1897–1913	Succeeded by Emilio de Meneses
