= Almirante Latorre-class battleship =

1915 Chilean battleship class

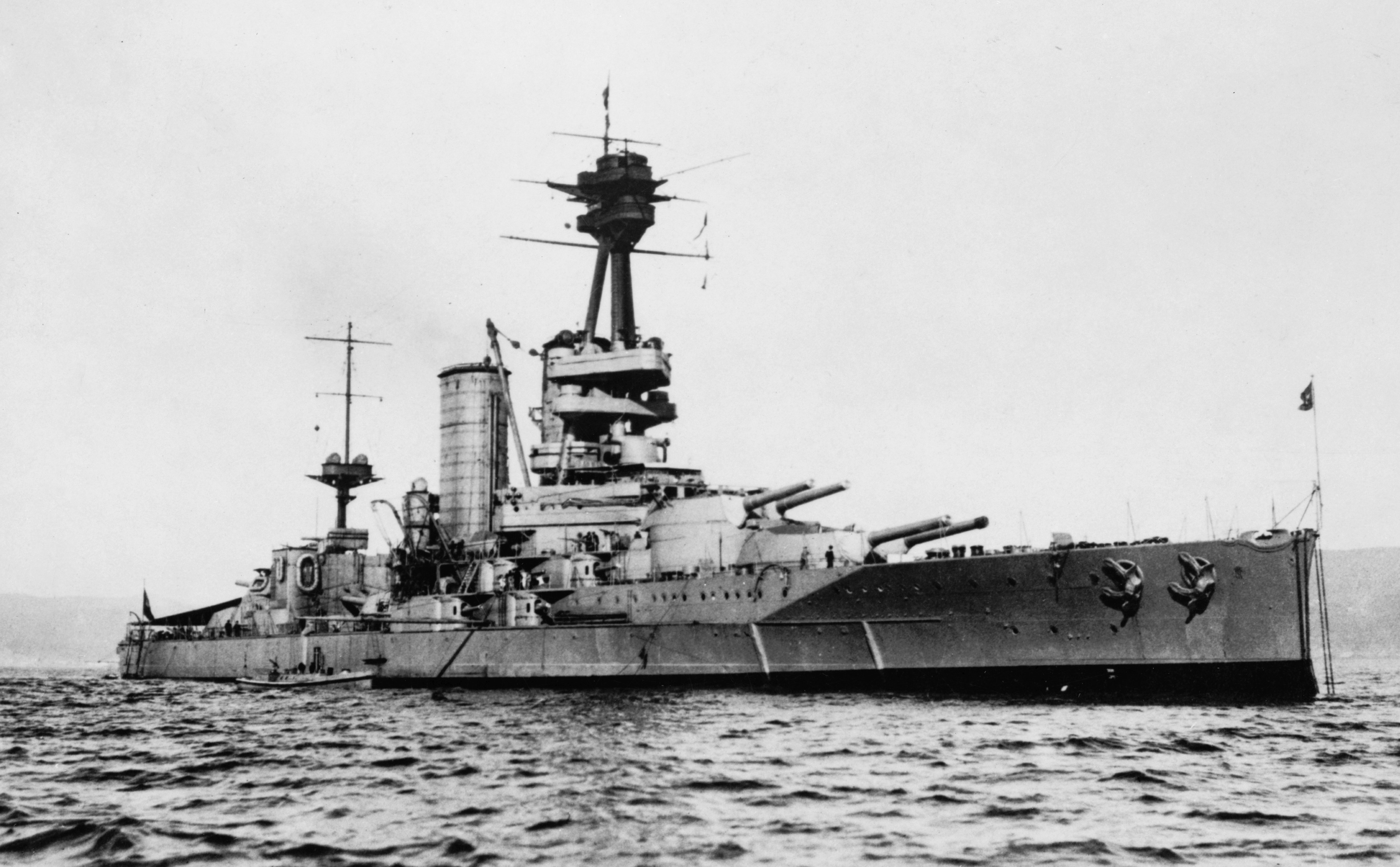
- Almirante Latorre at anchor during a sea trial in 1921

Class overview
- Builders: Armstrong Whitworth, Elswick Yard
- Operators: Chilean Navy; Royal Navy
- Preceded by: Capitán Prat
- Succeeded by: None
- Built: 2 (1 converted to an aircraft carrier)
- In commission: 1915–59
- Lost: 1
- Scrapped: 1

General characteristics
- Displacement: 28,100 long tons (28,600 t) standard and 31,610 long tons (32,120 t)
- Length: 661 ft (201 m) overall
- Beam: 92 ft (28 m)
- Draught: 29 ft (8.8 m)
- Installed power: 37,000 shp (27,591 kW)
- Propulsion: 21 Coal and oil-fired Yarrow boilers; Low pressure Parsons and High pressure Brown-Curtis/Parsons steam turbines
- Speed: 22.75 knots (42.13 km/h; 26.18 mph)
- Range: 4,400 nmi (8,100 km; 5,100 mi) at 10 knots (19 km/h; 12 mph)
- Complement: 1,167 (during the First World War)
- Armament: 10 × 14 inch (355 mm)/45 caliber BL guns; 16 × 6 in (152 mm) guns; 2 × 3 in (76 mm) anti-aircraft guns; 4 × 3-pounder guns; 4 × 21 in (533 mm) torpedo tubes (submerged)
- Armor: Belt: 9 to 4 in (230 to 100 mm); Deck: 4 to 1 in (102 to 25 mm); Barbette: 10 to 4 in (250 to 100 mm); Turret face: 10 in (250 mm); Conning tower: 11 in (280 mm)

The Almirante Latorre class consisted of two super-dreadnought battleships designed and constructed by the British company Armstrong Whitworth for the Chilean Navy.

The ships, which resembled the Royal Navy's Iron Duke class, were intended to be Chile's entries to the South American dreadnought race. However, both were purchased by the Royal Navy prior to completion for use in the First World War. Only one, Almirante Latorre (HMS Canada), was finished as a battleship; Almirante Cochrane (HMS Eagle), was converted to an aircraft carrier. Under their Chilean names, they honored Admirals (Almirantes) Juan José Latorre and Thomas Cochrane; they took their British names from what was then a dominion of Canada and a traditional ship name in the Royal Navy.

At the end of the 19th and the beginning of the 20th centuries, Chile was engaged in an intense naval competition with its neighbor Argentina. This ended peacefully in 1902, but less than a decade later Argentina responded to Brazil's order for two dreadnoughts with two of its own. The Chilean congress responded by allocating money for its own dreadnoughts, which were ordered from the United Kingdom despite a strong push from the American government for the contracts, probably due to Chile's traditionally strong ties with the British.

Almirante Latorre, which was closer to completion than its sister, was bought in 1914 and commissioned into British service as HMS Canada in October 1915. The ship spent its wartime service with the Grand Fleet, seeing action in the Battle of Jutland. After the war, HMS Canada was put into reserve before being sold back to Chile in 1920 as Almirante Latorre. The crew of the battleship instigated a naval mutiny in 1931. After several years of inactivity, the ship underwent a major refit in the United Kingdom in 1937, later allowing it to patrol Chile's coast during the Second World War. After a boiler room fire and a short stint as a prison ship, Almirante Latorre was scrapped in 1959. After Almirante Cochrane was purchased by the British in 1918, it was decided to convert the ship into an aircraft carrier. After numerous delays, Almirante Cochrane was commissioned into the Royal Navy as HMS Eagle in February 1924. It served in the Mediterranean Fleet and on the China Station in the inter-war period, and operated in the Atlantic and Mediterranean during the Second World War before being sunk in August 1942 during Operation Pedestal.

== Background ==
=== Argentine–Chilean boundary dispute ===
Conflicting Argentine and Chilean claims to Patagonia, a geographic region in the southernmost portion of South America, went back to the 1840s. In 1872 and again in 1878, Chilean warships seized merchant ships which had been licensed to operate in the disputed area by Argentina. An Argentine warship did the same to an American ship in 1877. These actions nearly led to war in November 1878, when Argentina dispatched a squadron of warships to the Santa Cruz River. Chile responded with the same, and war was only avoided when the Fierro–Sarratea treaty was hastily signed. Both countries were distracted in the next few years by Argentina's internal military operations against the indigenous population and Chile's War of the Pacific (Guerra del Pacífico) against Bolivia and Peru, but by 1890 a full-fledged naval arms race was underway between the two.

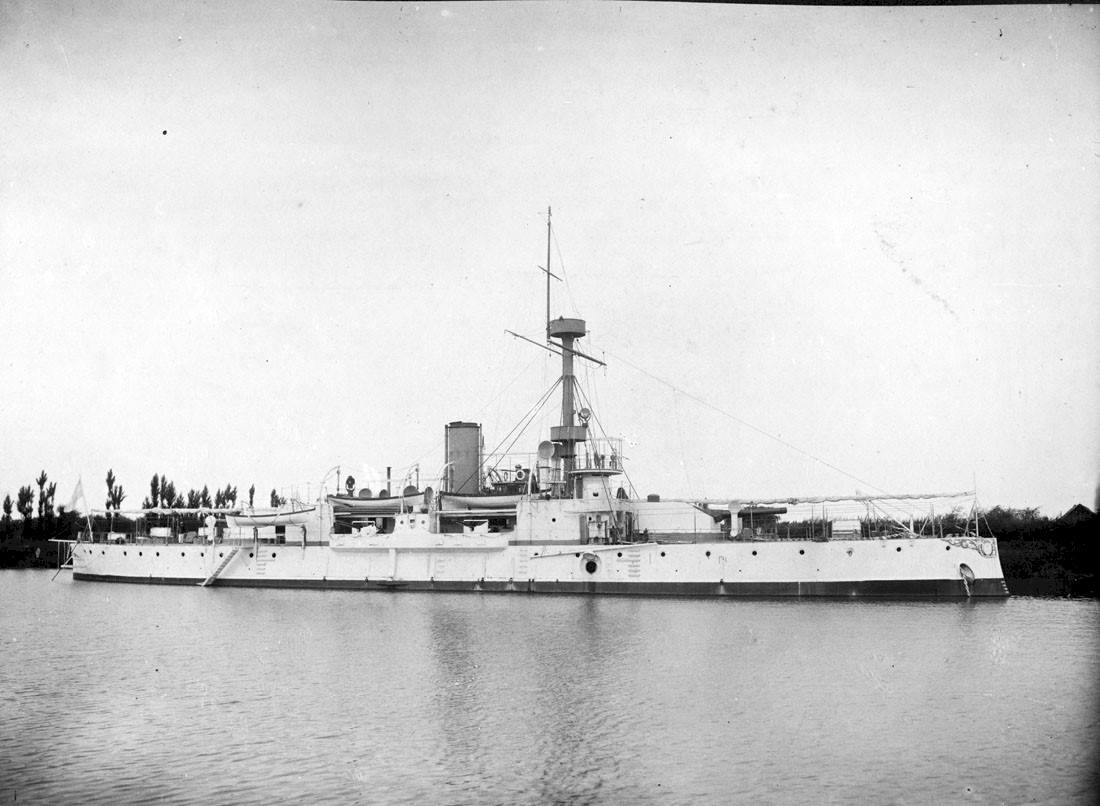
Libertad, seen here c. 1893, was laid down in 1890 as part of the developing naval arms race between Argentina and Chile.

Both sides began ordering warships from the United Kingdom. Chile added £3,129,500 in 1887 to the budget for its fleet, which was centered on two 1870s central battery ironclads, Almirante Cochrane and Blanco Encalada, and a protected cruiser. The battleship Capitán Prat, two protected cruisers, and two torpedo boats were ordered, and their keels were laid in 1890. Argentina responded soon after with an order for two battleships, Independencia and Libertad. The race continued through the 1890s, even after the Chilean Civil War of 1891. The two countries alternated cruiser orders between 1890 and 1895, each ship marking a small increase in capabilities from the ship previous. The Argentines upped the ante in July 1895 by buying an armored cruiser, Garibaldi, from Italy. Chile responded by ordering its own armored cruiser, O'Higgins, and six torpedo boats; Argentina quickly ordered another cruiser from Italy and later bought two more.

The race abated somewhat after a boundary dispute in the Puna de Atacama region was successfully mediated by the American ambassador to Argentina, William Paine Lord, in 1899, but more ships were ordered by Argentina and Chile in 1901. Argentina ordered two Garibaldi-class armored cruisers from Italy, and Chile replied with orders for two Constitución-class pre-dreadnought battleships. Argentina continued by signing letters of intent with Italian engineering company Ansaldo in May 1901 to buy two larger battleships.

The growing dispute disturbed the British government, who had extensive commercial interests in the area. Through their minister to Chile, they mediated negotiations between the two countries. These were successfully concluded on 28 May 1902 with three pacts, Pactos de Mayo. The third limited the naval armaments of both countries; both were barred from acquiring any further warships for five years without giving the other an eighteen months' advance notice. The United Kingdom purchased the two Chilean battleships, while Japan took over the order for the two Argentine armored cruisers; the two Argentine battleships were never ordered. Two Argentine cruisers and Chile's Capitán Prat were demilitarized.

Meanwhile, beginning in the late 1880s, Brazil's navy fell into obsolescence after an 1889 revolution, which deposed Emperor Dom Pedro II, and an 1893 civil war. By the turn of the 20th century it was lagging behind the Chilean and Argentine navies in quality and total tonnage, (Note: Chile's naval tonnage was 36,896 long tons (37,488 t), Argentina's 34,425 long tons (34,977 t), and Brazil's 27,661 long tons (28,105 t).) despite Brazil having nearly three times the population of Argentina and almost five times the population of Chile.

=== Dreadnought arms race ===
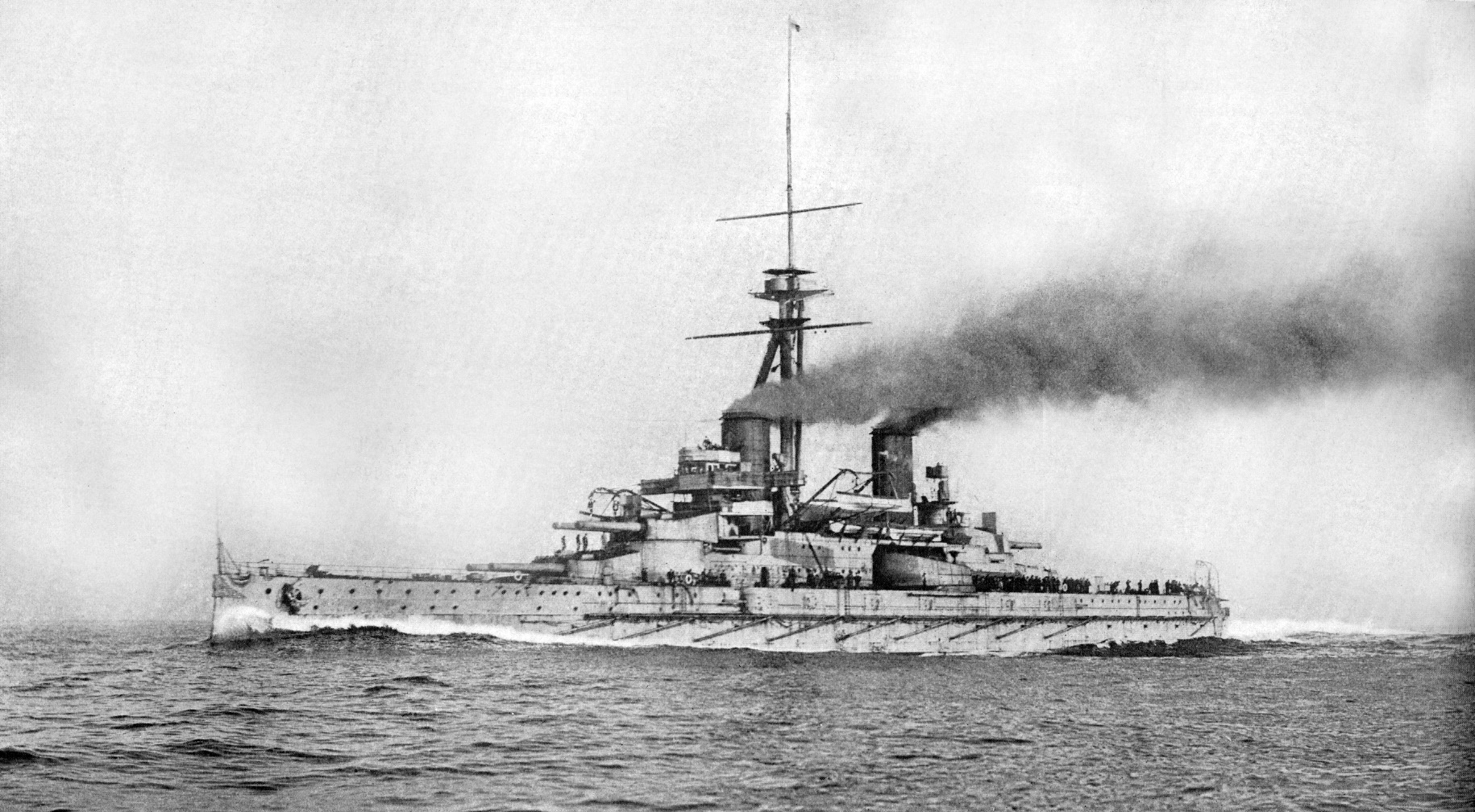
Brazil's order for two dreadnoughts (Minas Geraes pictured) sparked a naval arms race between themselves, Argentina, and Chile.

By 1904, Brazil—the largest country in South America in both size and population—began to seriously consider upgrading its navy, which had fallen to third in total tonnage. Soaring demand for coffee and rubber brought an influx of tax revenue, used to begin a large naval building plan. The centerpiece of the new navy would be two Minas Geraes-class dreadnoughts built by the United Kingdom. The order for these powerful ships, designed to carry the heaviest armament in the world at the time, shocked Argentina and Chile, causing them to cancel the 1902 armament-limiting pact with immediate effect. Alarmed, the American ambassador to Brazil sent a cablegram to his Department of State, warning them of the destabilizing effects that would occur if the situation devolved into a full naval arms race.

Argentina and other countries attempted to avert a full-scale naval arms race by offering to purchase one of the two dreadnoughts. Brazil refused Argentina's offer. After further tensions over the River Plate (Río de la Plata, literally "Silver River") area and inflammatory newspaper editorials favoring dreadnoughts, Argentina went ahead with a massive naval building plan. After a drawn-out bidding process among fifteen shipyards from the United States, Great Britain, Germany, France, and Italy, Argentina ordered two Rivadavia-class dreadnoughts with an option for a third from the United States. They also ordered twelve destroyers from three nations in Europe. With its major rival acquiring so many modern vessels, (Note: By 1911, the disparity between the navies of Chile, Argentina, and Brazil had grown; Brazil had nearly four times the tonnage of Chile, while Argentina had nearly three and a half times as much.) Chile wanted to respond as early as February 1906, but the country's naval plans were delayed by a major earthquake in 1906 and a financial depression in 1907 brought on by a drastic fall in the nitrate market. (Note: Livermore attributes part of this delay to a 1908 earthquake, but no major earthquake hit Chile in that year, cf. List of earthquakes in Chile. However, the Valparaíso earthquake of 1906 caused nearly 4,000 deaths, a tsunami, and a wide swath of destruction over the Chilean capital and surrounding areas. Given this, and at least one primary source's confirmation that the plans were delayed by the Valparaíso earthquake, it seems likely that Livermore's 1908 earthquake was a simple typographical error.)

== Bidding, construction, and sale to the British ==
On 6 July 1910, the National Congress of Chile passed a bill allocating funds for six destroyers, two submarines, and two large battleships, later named Almirante Latorre and Almirante Cochrane. (Note: Almirante Latorre was originally named Valparaíso, after the Chilean city, but was renamed to Libertad, Spanish for "freedom." After the death of the famed admiral Juan José Latorre, it was renamed Almirante Latorre in July 1912. Sources are not specific as to when the ship was renamed for the first time. Similar to its sister, Almirante Cochrane was named Santiago, for the city of the same name, Constitución, Spanish for "constitution." Almirante Cochrane was a tribute to another admiral, Thomas Cochrane.) Even before the decision was officially announced, the United Kingdom was widely viewed as the only country with a chance of landing the contract. The Chilean Navy had enjoyed a long-standing close relationship with its British counterpart, the Royal Navy, since the 1830s, when Chilean naval officers were given places on British ships to receive training and experience they could bring back to their country. This relationship had recently been cemented when a British naval mission was requested by Chile and sent in 1911.

Favor such as Great Britain showed Chile found no parallel in the world's other important navies ... except those countries linked by alliance to Great Britain. (Scheina, Naval History, 138, 364)

Still, the United States made a push to have the orders placed in an American shipyard. The American government sent Henry Prather Fletcher to be the new minister to Chile in September 1910. Fletcher had successfully implemented President William Howard Taft's "Dollar Diplomacy" policy in China. He met with resistance, which he attributed to lingering sentiment from the 1891 Baltimore Crisis: "My advances in the matter have not been met with frankness or encouragement and I feel a spirit of covert opposition. Under a very polite and courteous exterior there still exists a feeling of soreness towards us." The US naval attaché opined that, barring anything short of a revolution, the contracts would be given to the British. Indeed, the bidding process specified ships very close to the armament and armor mounted on recent British warships. Fletcher asked for an extension to the bidding process so that American shipbuilding firms could tailor proposals to these requirements, and this was granted.

During this time, Germany announced plans to send the battlecruiser Von der Tann on a South American cruise. As the ship was "widely advertised as the fastest and most powerful warship then afloat," the United States and United Kingdom felt its presence might give German companies an advantage in potential armament contracts, so they sent ships of their own. The United States sent the new battleship Delaware on a ten-week excursion to Brazil and Chile, carrying the body of the recently deceased Chilean minister, Anibal Cruz, to the United States; the British responded with an armored cruiser squadron. Delaware's captain was ordered to give the Chileans full access to the vessel—the only exception being that he should not give full particulars of the new fire-control system—in an attempt by the Navy Department "to aid the shipbuilding interests of the country [United States] to make contracts for the building of men-of-war for foreign countries." As a further incentive, the US indicated its willingness to provide a $25 million loan to support the purchase of the ship.

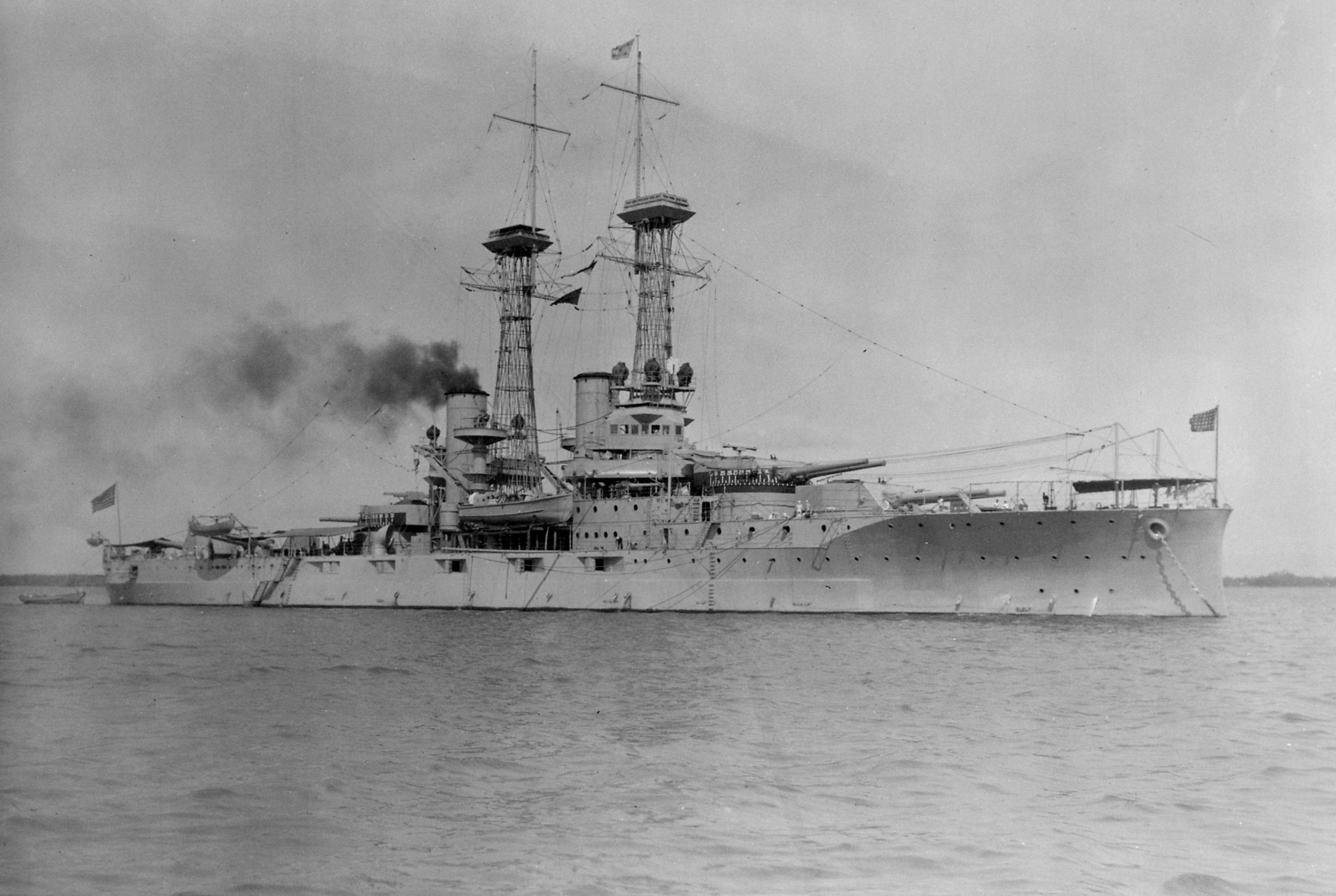
The American battleship USS Delaware was sent to Brazil and Chile in early 1911 as part of a concentrated effort to obtain the battleship contracts for American shipyards.

In the event, the efforts made by the United States came to little. The final decision came down to a choice between the American and British tenders, and with a loan from the Rothchilds, Chile awarded one battleship contract to the latter's Armstrong Whitworth on 25 July 1911. The design was drawn up by J.R. Perret, who had also designed Brazil's Rio de Janeiro. (Note: Rio de Janeiro was ordered for Brazil from Armstrong in 1911, but falling government revenues forced Brazil to look for a country willing to purchase her. The Ottoman Empire obliged and bought the battleship over before completion, renaming it Sultân Osmân-ı Evvel. The battleship was completed on the eve of the First World War, but shortly after it began, Sultân Osmân-ı Evvel was taken over by the Royal Navy to prevent it from being used against the Triple Entente.) The United States still hoped that Chile would order American 14-inch/50 caliber guns for the battleship's main battery armament, but orders came only for coastal artillery. The second dreadnought was awarded to Armstrong in June 1912. Six Almirante Lynch-class destroyers were ordered in 1911 from J. Samuel White to accompany the new dreadnoughts. Before construction began, the Almirante Latorre design was enlarged to mount sixteen 6-inch (152 mm) rather than twenty-two 4.7-inch (119 mm) guns. This increased the displacement by 600 long tons (610 t), to 28,000 long tons (28,449 t), the draft by 6.5 inches (170 mm), to 33 feet (10 m), and made the ship a quarter-knot slower, to 22.75 knots.

Officially ordered on 2 November 1911 and laid down less than a month later on 27 November, the first dreadnought became the largest ship that Armstrong had built. The second dreadnought was ordered on 29 July 1912 and laid down on 22 January 1913, delayed by Rio de Janeiro occupying the slipway in which it would be built. The New York Tribune (2 November 1913) and Proceedings (May and June 1914) reported that Greece had reached an accord to purchase the first battleship counterbalance the Ottoman Empire's acquisition of Rio de Janeiro from Brazil, but despite a developing sentiment within Chile to sell one or both of the dreadnoughts, no deal was made. (Note: The nationalistic sentiments that exacerbated the naval arms race had given way to a slowing economy and growing public opinion that supported investing inside the country. The United States' Minister to Chile, Henry Prather Fletcher, commented to Secretary of State William Jennings Bryan: "Since the naval rivalry began in 1910, financial conditions, which were none too good then, have grown worse; and as time approaches for the final payment, feeling has been growing in these countries that perhaps they are much more in need of money than of battleships.")

Almirante Latorre was launched first, on 27 November 1913, (Note: Scheina gives 17 November as the launching date.) in an elaborate ceremony that was attended by various dignitaries and presided over by Chile's ambassador to the United Kingdom, Agustín Edwards Mac Clure. The battleship was christened by the ambassador's wife, Olga Budge de Edwards, and weighed 10,700 long tons (10,900 t) at the time. After the First World War broke out in Europe, work on Almirante Latorre was halted in August 1914, and it was formally purchased on 9 September after the British Cabinet recommended it four days earlier. Almirante Latorre was not forcibly seized like the Ottoman Reşadiye and Sultân Osmân-ı Evvel (ex-Rio de Janeiro), two other ships being built for a foreign navy, because of Chile's "friendly neutral" status with the United Kingdom. The former Chilean ship was completed on 30 September 1915, and commissioned into the Royal Navy on 15 October. Work on the other ship, Almirante Cochrane, was halted after the outbreak of war. The British purchased it on 28 February 1918 to be converted to an aircraft carrier, as the partially completed ship was the only available large and fast hull capable of being modified into a full flush-deck carrier. Low priority and quarrels with shipyard workers slowed completion of the ship.

== Service histories ==
Almirante Latorre was renamed HMS Canada and slightly modified for British service. The ship completed fitting-out on 20 September 1915, and was commissioned into the Royal Navy on 15 October. It initially served with the 4th Battle Squadron of the Grand Fleet, and saw action in the Battle of Jutland on 31 May and 1 June 1916. It fired 42 rounds from its 14-inch guns and 109 6-inch shells during the battle, and suffered no hits or casualties. Canada was transferred to the 1st Battle Squadron on 12 June 1916, received further modifications in 1917 and 1918, and was put into reserve in March 1919.

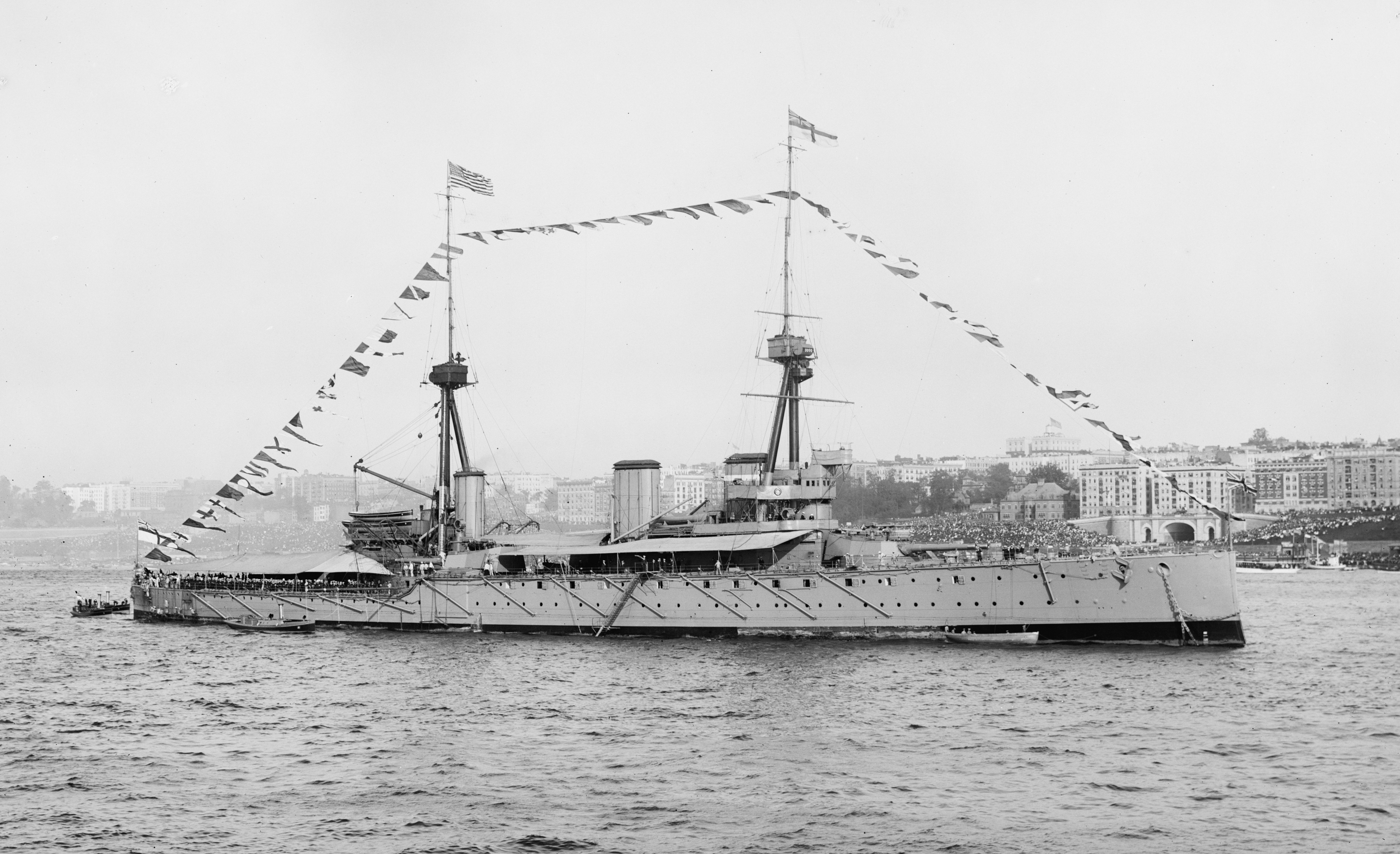
Inflexible would have been one of two Invincible-class battlecruisers sold to Chile, but monetary considerations and significant opposition prevented their purchase.

After the end of the war in Europe, Chile began to seek additional ships to bolster its fleet, and the United Kingdom eagerly offered many of its surplus warships. This action worried the nations of South America, who feared that a Chilean attempt to regain the title of "the first naval power in South America" would destabilize the region and start another naval arms race. Chile asked for Almirante Cochrane in addition to Canada, but would not purchase the ship unless it was reconstructed into the original battleship configuration. The British halted work on the incomplete ship while seriously considering the offer in October 1919. But because of the increased cost of reconverting her—£2.5 million, compared to a potential profit of £1.5 million from selling her—and a desire to test the aircraft carrier concept and especially the viability of island superstructures, the British kept and completed the ship, as HMS Eagle.

In April 1920, Chile only bought Canada and four destroyers, all of which had been ordered by Chile prior to the war's outbreak and requisitioned by the British for the war. Planned replacements for Almirante Cochrane included the two remaining Invincible-class battlecruisers, but a leak to the press of the secret negotiations to acquire them caused an uproar. The most visible dissension came from a block of officers in the navy who publicly opposed any possible purchase and instead promoted a "New Navy" which would acquire submarines and airplanes. They argued that these weapons would cost less and give the country, and its lengthy coastline, better protection from external threats. The ships were not bought for reasons of cost, but neither were the airplanes its supporters had been hoping for.

=== Almirante Latorre in Chilean service ===
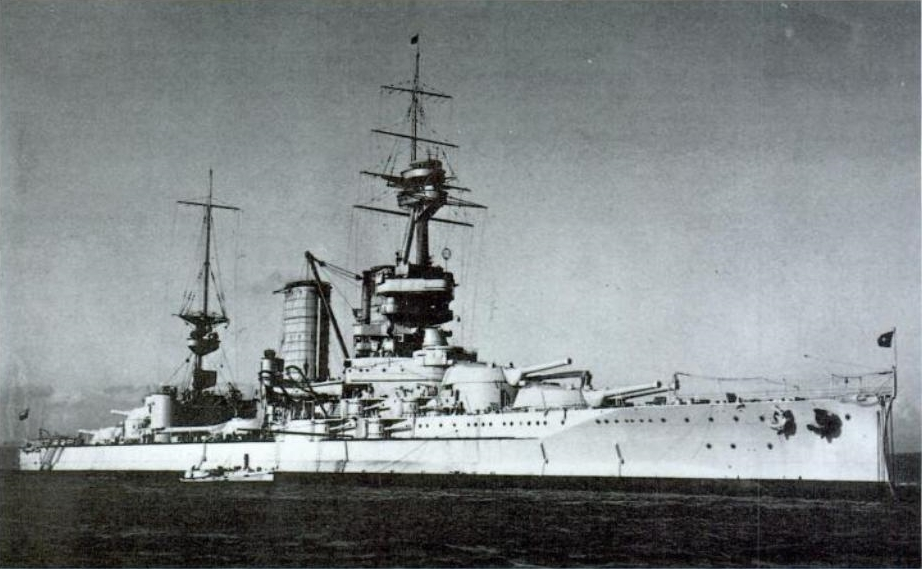
Almirante Latorre in the 1930s

Canada was renamed Almirante Latorre once again and formally handed over to the Chilean government on 27 November 1920. It departed Plymouth the same day with two of the destroyers, and they arrived in Chile on 20 February 1921, where they were welcomed by Chile's president, Arturo Alessandri. Almirante Latorre was made the flagship of the navy. The dreadnought was frequently used by Alessandri for various functions, including as transport to Vallenar after a 1922 earthquake, and to Talcahuano for the grand opening of a new naval drydock in 1924. In 1925, with the fall of the January Junta, the ship hosted Alessandri after his return from exile. In September, the last month of his term, Alessandri received the United Kingdom's Edward, Prince of Wales, on board the battleship.

Almirante Latorre was sent to the United Kingdom for a modernization at the Devonport Dockyard in 1929. It lasted for quite some time, but finally left for Valparaíso nearly two years later, on 5 March 1931, and arrived on 12 April. Not long after it returned, crewmembers aboard Almirante Latorre instigated a major mutiny. The revolt was a result of the country's economic woes in the midst of the Great Depression and a recent pay cut. Most of the navy's ships joined Almirante Latorre in the mutiny, but they surrendered five days after it began when an air strike was mounted by government forces. Almirante Latorre ended up in the Bay of Tongoy with Blanco Encalada.

With Chile still in the midst of the depression, Almirante Latorre was deactivated at Talcahuano in 1933 to lessen government expenditures, and only a caretaker crew was assigned to tend to the mothballed ship into the mid-1930s. (Note: It is not clear when Almirante Latorre was reactivated. Scheina gives two possible years, 1935 or after the 1937 refit.) Soon after Japan's attack on Pearl Harbor, the United States approached Chile with the aim of purchasing Almirante Latorre, two destroyers, and a submarine tender to bolster the United States Navy, but the offer was declined. Almirante Latorre was used during the Second World War for Chilean neutrality patrols. The ship remained active until 1951, when an accident in its engine room killed three crewmen. Moored at Talcahuano, the battleship became a storage facility for fuel oil. It was decommissioned in October 1958, and was sold in February 1959 to be broken up for scrap in Japan. Almirante Latorre was taken under tow by the tug Cambrian Salvos on 29 May 1959, and reached Yokohama, Japan, at the end of August, (Note: Sources disagree as to the exact date. Whitley, the New York Times, and Burt give 28, 29, and 30 August, respectively.) though the scrapping process did not begin immediately on arrival.

=== Almirante Cochrane/Eagle in British service ===
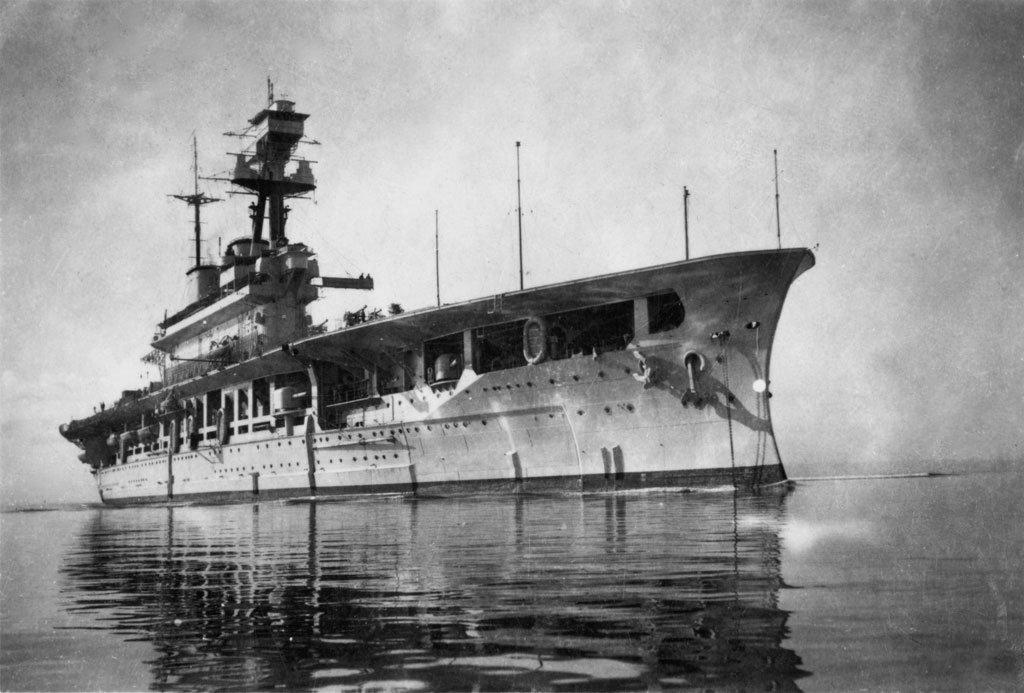
Eagle in the Mediterranean, where it would be sunk in August 1942

Eagle was used for trials throughout 1920. As the concept of aircraft carriers was still very new, the lessons learned were incorporated in a 1921–23 refit. Its official sea trials were conducted in September 1923, and it was commissioned on 26 February 1924. The new ship was sent to the Mediterranean Fleet in June, and alternated between refits in the United Kingdom (1926, 1929) and the Mediterranean until 1931, when Eagle was sent to show the flag on a South American cruise. Between its major refits in 1931–32 and 1936, Eagle was sent to the China Station before rotating back to the Mediterranean. After 1936, it was sent back to the Far East, and was there when the Second World War broke out in September 1939. For the next seven months, Eagle was used for anti-raider patrols, but when one of its own aircraft bombs exploded on board in March 1940, the carrier was forced to sail to Singapore for repairs. Soon after, Eagle was again moved to the Mediterranean, where it protected convoys until May 1941, when it was sent to Gibraltar. The ship spent the next several months in the South Atlantic, on guard against German raiders.

In September, a major fire severely damaged Eagle, so it was sent back to the United Kingdom. The refit lasted from October 1941 to February 1942, and it was quickly sent to reinforce Force H. It was employed to ferry fighters to Malta in attempts to keep the besieged island under British control. As part of this duty, it was used to cover a convoy in August 1942 (Operation Pedestal); during the voyage, Eagle was sunk in four minutes by four torpedoes from the German submarine U-73.

== Specifications ==
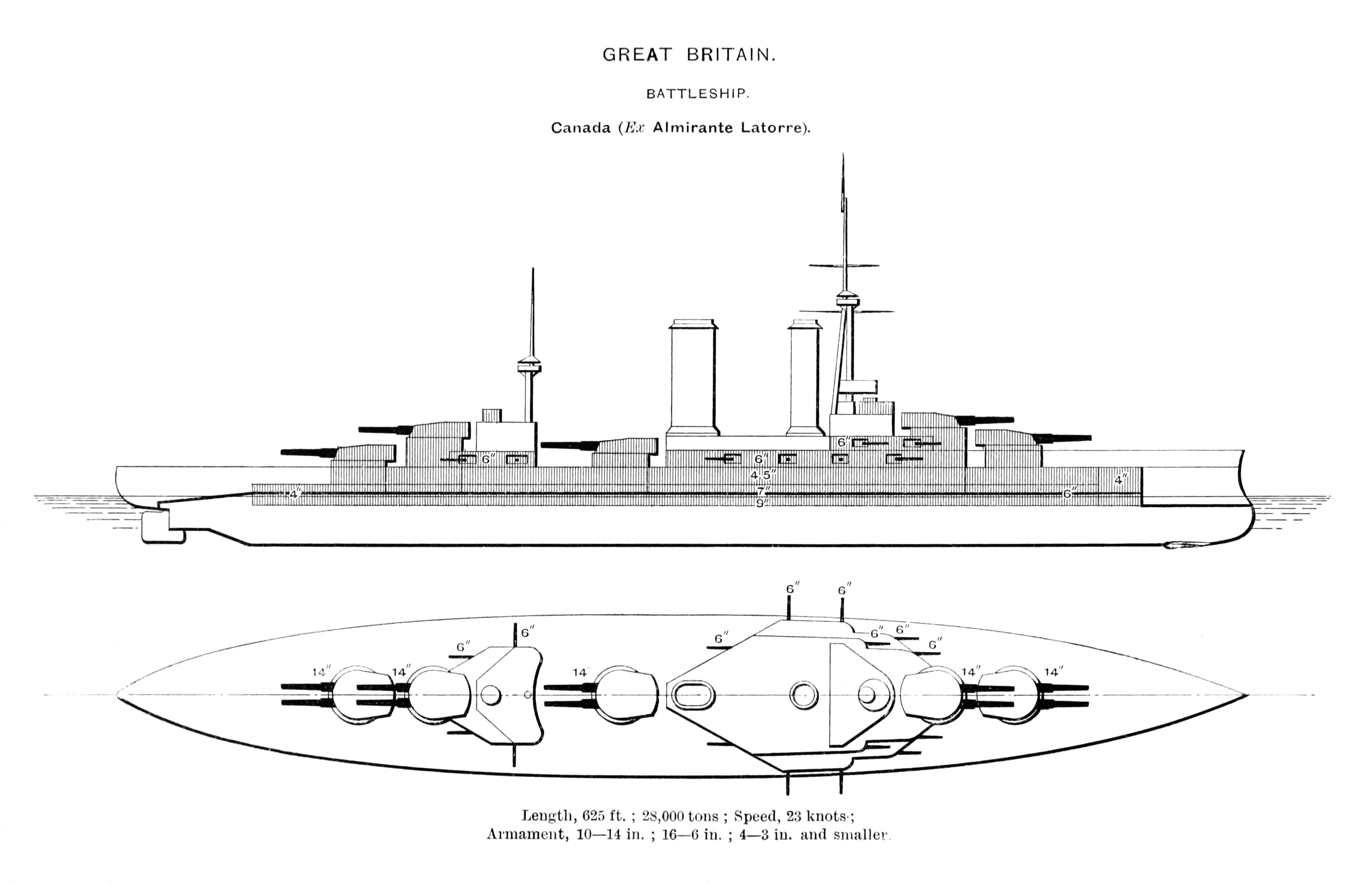
Almirante Latorre was the last South American dreadnought built, and was larger and better armed than its counterparts in Brazil and Argentina. The more efficient arrangement of the five 14-inch turrets, with all mounted on the centerline rather than en echelon, allowed the main battery to fire on a single broadside without damaging the ship.

Almirante Latorre closely resembled the British Iron Duke class, the major difference being that the Chilean ship was longer, had less forecastle but more quarterdeck, and had larger funnels along with an aft mast. The ship was 28,100 long tons (28,600 t) standard and 31,610 long tons (32,120 t) at full load. At 661 feet (201 m) overall, it was 39 feet (12 m) longer than the Iron Duke-class; it had a beam of 92 feet (28 m) and a mean draft of 29 feet (8.8 m).

The ship's main battery was composed of ten 14-inch/45 caliber guns mounted in five dual turrets. The arrangement was the same as for the Iron Duke class, with two turrets superfiring forward and a single turret amidships separated from the aft superfiring pair by superstructure and a mast. Built by the Elswick Ordnance Company, the guns were able to fire a 1,586-pound (719 kg) shell at a muzzle velocity of 1507 ft/s (764 m/s) to a maximum range of 24,400 yards (22,300 m). They were able to depress to −5° and elevate to 20°. Fourteen of these guns were manufactured, ten mounted on Almirante Latorre and four kept for use as spares. The latter were kept by the United Kingdom after the sale to Chile and scrapped in 1922, while those built for Almirante Cochrane were at least originally kept for potential later use on Almirante Latorre. The secondary battery was originally composed of sixteen 6-inch Mark XI, two 3-inch 20 cwt anti-aircraft guns, four 3-pounders, and four submerged 21-inch torpedo tubes. The two 6-inch guns located farthest aft were removed in 1916, as they were affected by blast damage from the amidships 14-inch turret. During the 1929 refit in the United Kingdom, four additional anti-aircraft guns were placed in the aft superstructure.

Almirante Latorre was powered by steam turbines manufactured by Brown–Curtis and Parsons, which put out 37,000 shaft horsepower, and 21 Yarrow boilers. Together, these turned four propellers which drove the ship through the water at a maximum speed of 22.75 knots (26.18 mph; 42.13 km/h). 3,300 metric tons (3,200 long tons) of coal and 520 metric tons (510 long tons) of oil could be carried, giving the ship a maximum theoretical range of 4,400 nautical miles (5,100 mi; 8,100 km) at 10 knots (12 mph; 19 km/h).

The battleship's armor was composed of a 9-to-4-inch (229 to 102 mm) belt, 4.5-to-3-inch (114 to 76 mm) bulkheads, 10-to-4-inch (254 to 102 mm) barbettes, 10-inch (254 mm) turret faces, a 4-to-3-inch (102 to 76 mm) turret roof, a 11-inch (280 mm) conning tower, and 4-to-1-inch (102 to 25 mm) armoured decks.
