= Chilean battleship Almirante Latorre =

Dreadnought, launched 1913, scrapped 1959

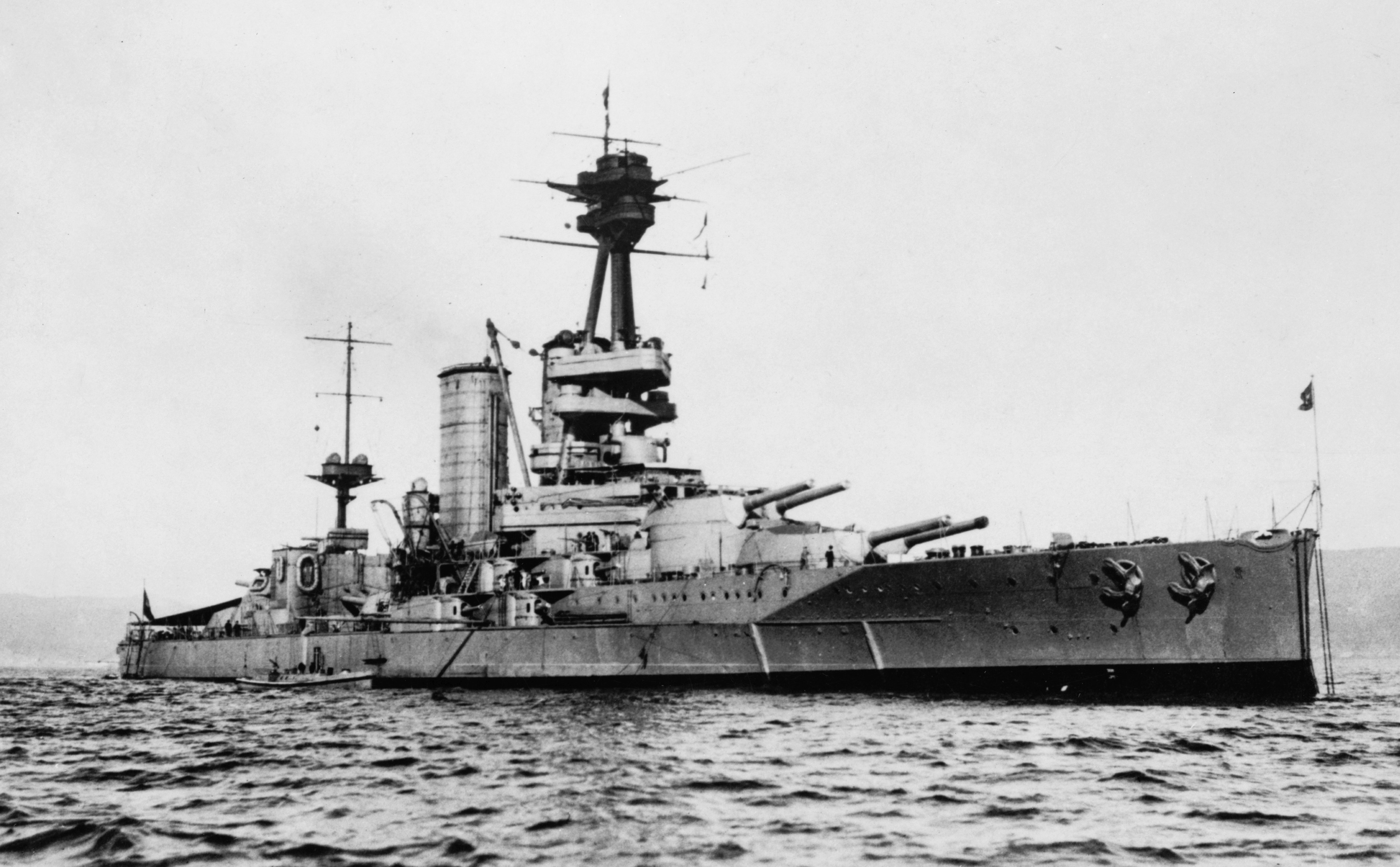
- Almirante Latorre in 1921

History

United Kingdom
- Name: Canada
- Builder: Armstrong Whitworth, Elswick
- Laid down: 27 November 1911
- Launched: 27 November 1913, as Almirante Latorre
- Acquired: 9 September 1914
- Commissioned: 15 October 1915
- Decommissioned: March 1919
- Fate: Resold to Chile, April 1920

Chile
- Name: Almirante Latorre
- Acquired: April 1920
- Commissioned: 1 August 1920
- Decommissioned: October 1958
- Refit: 1929–1931
- Fate: Sold for scrap, February 1959

General characteristics
- Class & type: Almirante Latorre-class battleship
- Displacement: 28,600 long tons (29,059 t)
- Length: 661 ft (201.5 m) overall
- Beam: 92 ft 6 in (28.2 m)
- Draught: 29 ft (8.8 m) mean
- Installed power: 21 Yarrow boilers; 37,000 shp (27,591 kW)
- Propulsion: 4 shafts; 2 steam turbine sets
- Speed: 22.75 knots (42.1 km/h; 26.2 mph)
- Complement: 834
- Armament: 5 × twin 14 in (356 mm) guns; 16 × single 6 in (152 mm) guns; 2 × single 3 in (76 mm) AA guns; 4 × single 47 mm (1.9 in) guns; 4 × 21 in (533 mm) torpedo tubes
- Armor: Belt: 9 in (230 mm); Deck: 1.5 in (38 mm); Barbette: 10 in (254 mm); Turret: 10 in (254 mm); Conning tower: 11 in (280 mm)

Almirante Latorre, named after Juan José Latorre, was a dreadnought battleship built for the Chilean Navy (Armada de Chile). It was the first of a planned two-ship class that would respond to earlier warship purchases by other South American countries. Construction began at Elswick, Newcastle upon Tyne soon after the ship was ordered in November 1911, and was approaching completion when it was bought by the United Kingdom's Royal Navy for use in the First World War. Commissioned in September 1915, it served in the Grand Fleet as HMS Canada for the duration of the war and saw action during the Battle of Jutland.

Chile repurchased Canada in 1920 and renamed it Almirante Latorre. The ship was designated as Chile's flagship, and frequently served as a presidential transport. It underwent a thorough modernization in the United Kingdom in 1929–1931. In September 1931, crewmen aboard Almirante Latorre instigated a mutiny, which the majority of the Chilean fleet quickly joined. After divisions developed between the mutineers, the rebellion fell apart and the ships returned to government control. Almirante Latorre was placed in reserve for a time in the 1930s because of the Great Depression, but it was in good enough condition to receive interest from the United States after the attack on Pearl Harbor. The Chilean government declined the overture and the ship spent most of the Second World War on patrol for Chile. Almirante Latorre was scrapped in Japan beginning in 1959.

== Background ==
In the 1880s, an Argentine–Chilean naval arms race began after territorial disputes over the two country's mutual borders in Patagonia and Puna de Atacama, along with control of the Beagle Channel. The arms race was eventually ended via British mediation, and provisions in the dispute-ending treaty imposed restrictions on both countries' navies. The United Kingdom's Royal Navy bought two Constitución-class pre-dreadnought battleships that were being built for Chile, and Argentina sold its two Rivadavia-class armored cruisers under construction in Italy to Japan.

After HMS Dreadnought was commissioned, Brazil decided in early 1907 to halt construction of three obsolescent pre-dreadnoughts in favor of two or three dreadnoughts. These ships, commissioned as the Minas Geraes class, were designed to carry the heaviest battleship armament in the world at the time. They came as a shock to the navies of South America. Historian Robert Scheina commented that they "outclassed the entire [elderly] Argentinian fleet". Although debates raged in Argentina over whether it would be prudent to counter Brazil's purchase by acquiring their own expensive dreadnoughts, further border disputes—particularly near the River Plate with Brazil—decided the matter, and it ordered two Rivadavia-class battleships (no relation to the earlier cruisers) from the Fore River Shipbuilding Company in the United States. With its major rival acquiring dreadnoughts, Chile responded by asking for tenders from American and European countries that would give the country the most powerful battleships afloat.

== Construction ==
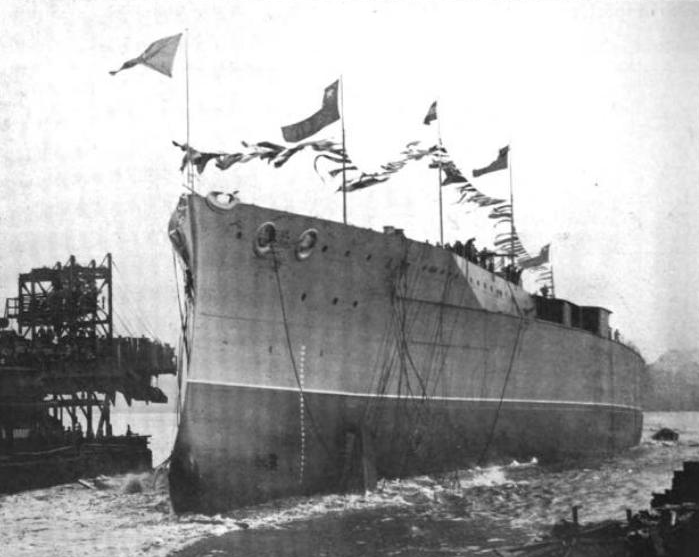
Almirante Latorre's launch, November 1913.

On 6 July 1910, the National Congress of Chile passed a bill allocating 400,000 pounds sterling annually to the navy for the construction of two 28,000-long-ton (28,449 t) battleships—which would eventually be named Almirante Latorre and Almirante Cochrane (Note: Almirante Latorre was originally named Valparaíso, after the Chilean city, but was renamed to Libertad, Spanish for "freedom". After the death of the famed admiral Juan José Latorre, it was renamed Almirante Latorre in July 1912. Sources are not specific as to when the ship was renamed for the first time.)—six destroyers, and two submarines. The contract to build the battleships was awarded to Armstrong Whitworth on 25 July 1911. Almirante Latorre was officially ordered on 2 November 1911, and was laid down less than a month later on 27 November, becoming the largest ship built by Armstrong at the time. The New York Tribune reported on 2 November 1913 that Greece had reached an accord to purchase Almirante Latorre during a war scare with the Ottoman Empire, but despite a developing sentiment within Chile to sell one or both of the dreadnoughts, no deal was made. (Note: The nationalistic sentiments that exacerbated the naval arms race had given way to a slowing economy and growing public opinion that supported investing inside the country. The United States' Minister to Chile, Henry Prather Fletcher, commented to Secretary of State William Jennings Bryan: "Since the naval rivalry began in 1910, financial conditions, which were none too good then, have grown worse; and as time approaches for the final payment, feeling has been growing in these countries that perhaps they are much more in need of money than of battleships.")

Almirante Latorre was launched on 27 November 1913, (Note: Scheina gives 17 November as the launching date.) in an elaborate ceremony that was attended by various dignitaries and presided over by Chile's ambassador to the United Kingdom, Agustín Edwards Mac Clure. The battleship was christened by the ambassador's wife, Olga Budge de Edwards.

== British purchase and First World War service ==
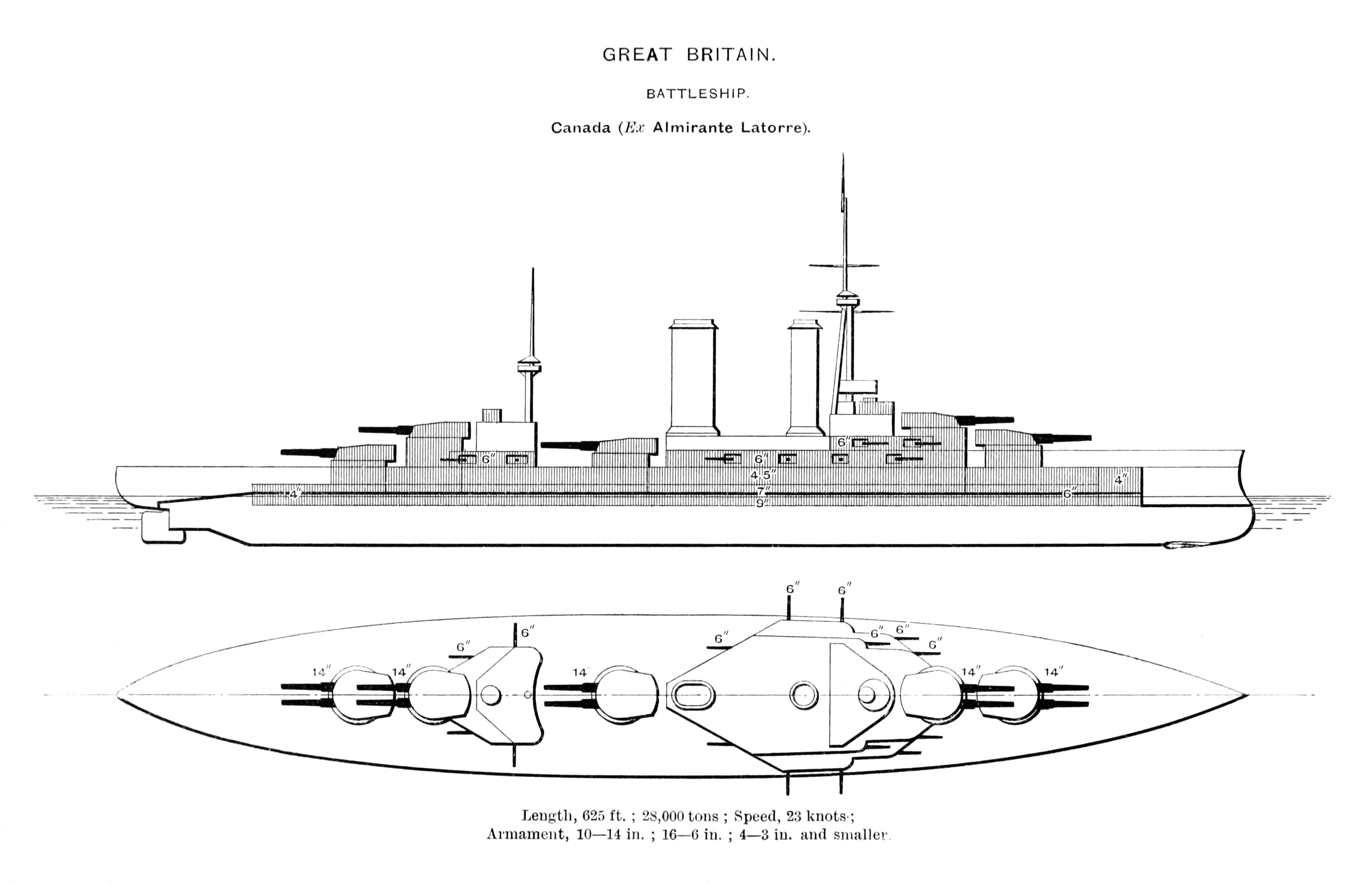
Plans of HMS Canada

After the First World War broke out in Europe, Almirante Latorre was formally purchased by the United Kingdom on 9 September 1914; it was not forcibly seized like other ships being built in British yards for foreign navies (such as the battleships Reşadiye and Sultân Osmân-ı Evvel for the Ottoman Empire) because the Allies' reliance on Chilean sodium nitrate for munitions made retention of Chile's "friendly neutral" status with the United Kingdom a matter of vital importance. Almirante Latorre was renamed HMS Canada and slightly modified for British service. The bridge was taken off in favor of two open platforms, and a mast was added in between the two funnels to support a derrick that would service launches. The super-dreadnought completed fitting-out on 20 September 1915, and was commissioned into the Royal Navy on 15 October.

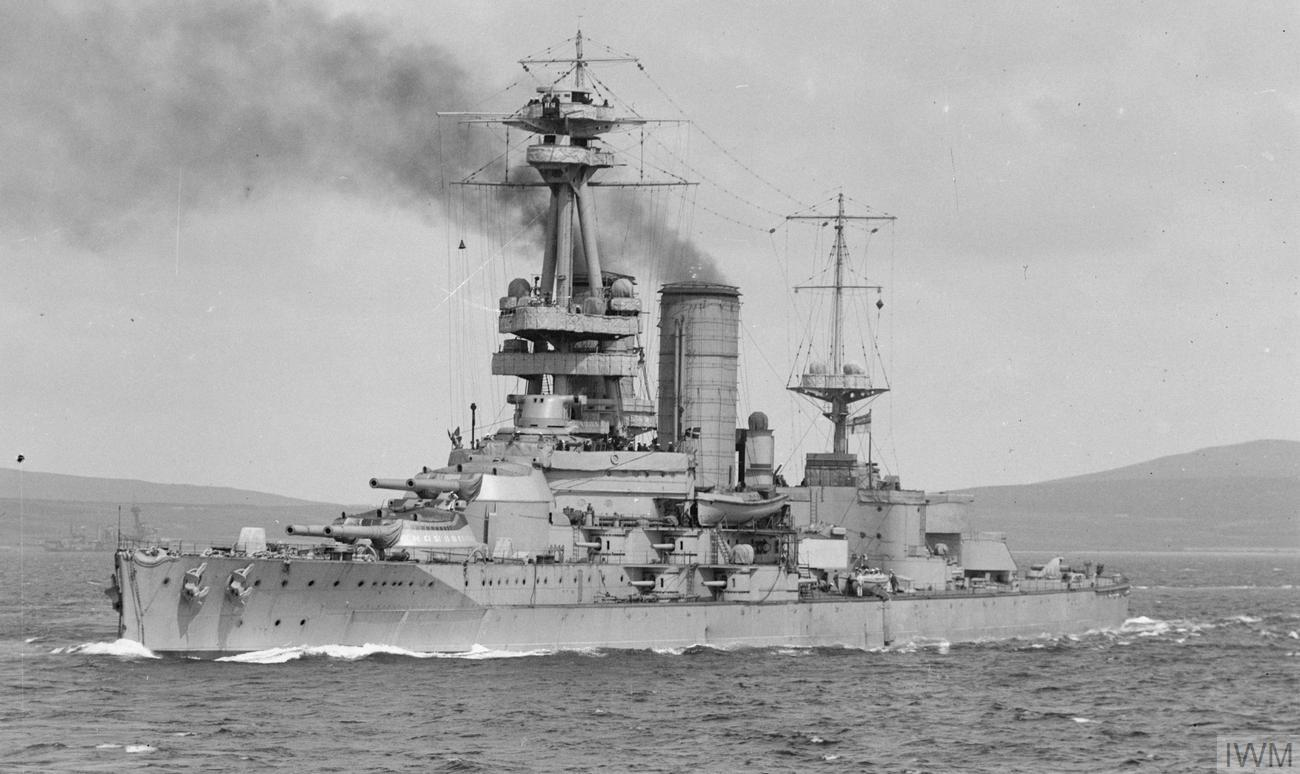
HMS Canada underway during World War I

She initially served with the 4th Battle Squadron of the Grand Fleet. Canada saw action in the Battle of Jutland on 31 May–1 June 1916 under Captain William Nicholson. It fired 42 rounds from its 14-inch guns and 109 6-inch shells during the battle, and suffered no hits or casualties. During the battle, it got off two salvoes at the disabled cruiser Wiesbaden at 18:40, and fired five more at an unknown ship around 19:20. It fired its 6-inch guns at German destroyers at 19:11.

Canada was transferred to the 1st Battle Squadron on 12 June 1916. In 1917–18, it was fitted with better rangefinders and range dials, and two of the aft 6-inch secondary guns were removed after they suffered blast damage from the middle 14-inch turret. In the latter year, flying-off platforms for aircraft were added atop the superfiring turrets fore and aft. Canada was put into the reserve fleet in March 1919.

== Chilean service ==
=== Early career ===
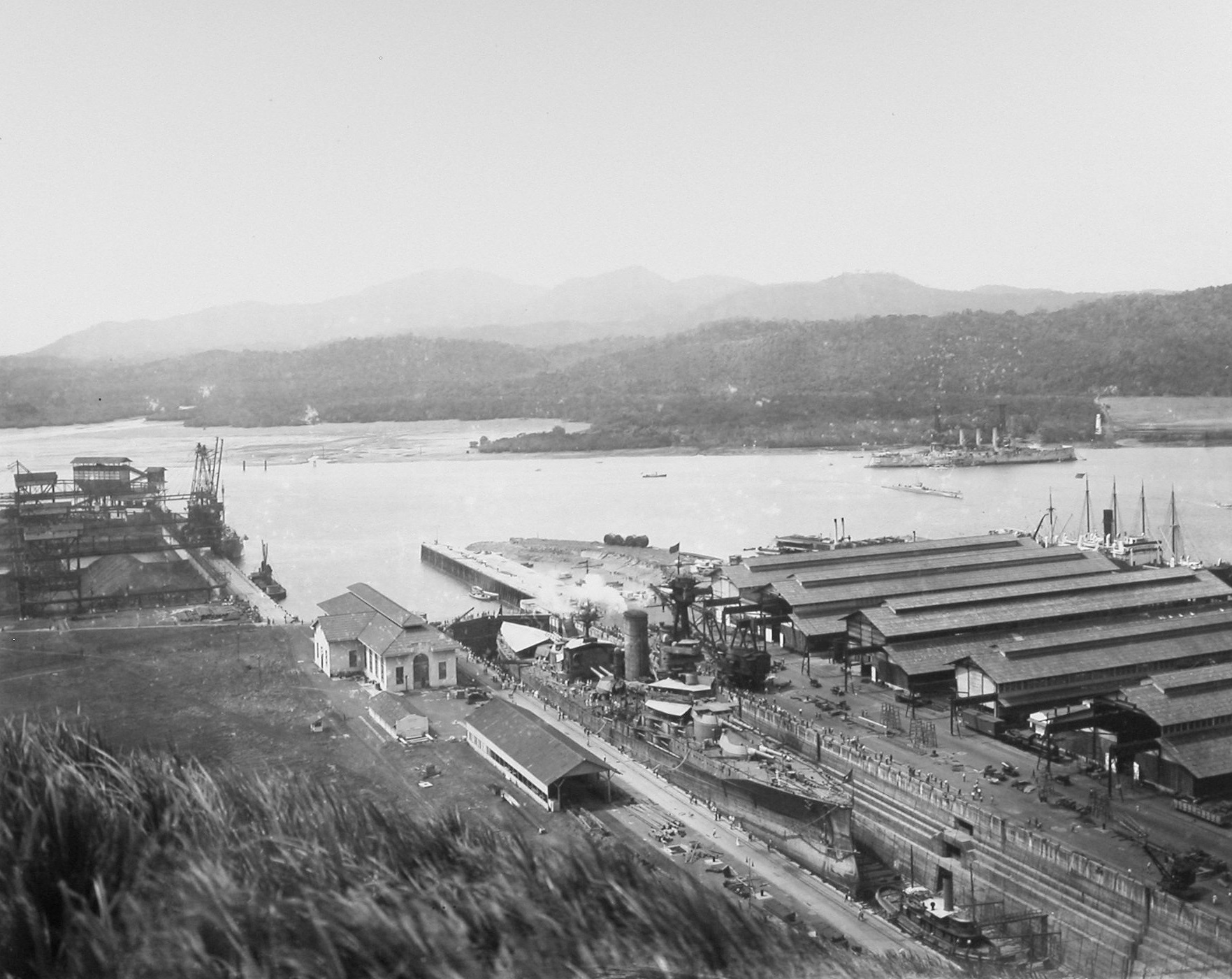
Almirante Latorre in a Balboa, Panama, drydock on 17 January 1921, while voyaging from the United Kingdom to Chile

After the end of the war in Europe, Chile began to seek additional ships to bolster its fleet. The United Kingdom offered many of its surplus warships, including the two remaining Invincible-class battlecruisers. (Note: Prior to the Invincible offer, Chile asked for HMS Eagle, which had been Almirante Cochrane but was in the process of being converted into an aircraft carrier. Chile, however, would not accept Eagle unless it was reconstructed into the original battleship configuration. This was found to be "impractical".) The news that Chile could possibly acquire those two capital ships started an uproar in the country, with naval officers publicly denouncing such an action and instead promoting the virtues of submarines and aircraft on the basis of lower costs and their performance in the First World War. Other nations of South America worried that an attempt to regain the title of "the first naval power in South America", as The New York Times put it, would start another naval arms race.

In the end, Chile purchased only Canada and four destroyers in April 1920, all of which had been ordered by Chile prior to the war's outbreak and requisitioned by the British. The total cost of the five ships was less than a third of what Chile was due to pay for Almirante Latorre in 1914. Canada was renamed Almirante Latorre once again and formally handed over to the Chilean government on 27 November 1920. It departed Plymouth the same day with two of the destroyers, Riveros and Almirante Uribe, under the command of Admiral Luis Gomez Carreño. They arrived in Chile on 20 February 1921, where they were welcomed by Chile's president, Arturo Alessandri. Almirante Latorre was made the flagship of the navy.

In its capacity as flagship of the Chilean Navy, Almirante Latorre was frequently utilized by the president for various functions. In the aftermath of the magnitude 8.5 1922 Vallenar earthquake, Almirante Latorre was used to transport Alessandri to the affected area. The ship also brought necessary supplies (including shelter, food, and money) for those affected. By 1923, Chile only had Almirante Latorre, a cruiser, and five destroyers in commission, leading The New York Times to remark "experts would probably place Chile third in potential sea power [after Brazil and Argentina]". While Almirante Latorre was individually more powerful than the Brazilian or Argentine dreadnoughts, they had two each to Chile's one. Compounding this was a lack of modern cruisers to accompany the lone dreadnought. In 1924, Almirante Latorre hosted the president again when he visited Talcahuano for the grand opening of a new naval drydock there. After the fall of the January Junta in 1925, the dreadnought hosted the returning President Alessandri during a fleet review in Valparaíso; while on board, he gave a speech to senior naval officials to assure them that his new government "was for all Chileans, and not partisan in its inspiration". In September, the last month of his term, Alessandri received the United Kingdom's Edward, Prince of Wales, on board the battleship. The visit briefly quelled domestic unrest, and it marked the beginning of negotiations for a British naval mission, which arrived in the following year.

Almirante Latorre was sent to the United Kingdom for a modernization at the Devonport Dockyard in 1929. Departing Chile on 15 May, it traveled past Balboa before traversing the Panama Canal nine days later. After refueling at Port of Spain on 28 May, the dreadnought continued across the Atlantic, passing the Azores before arriving in Plymouth on 24 June. Major alterations included rebuilding the bridge, updating the main battery fire control to more modern standards, adding fire control for the secondary armament, and replacing the ship's steam turbine engines. Also added were a new mast between the third and fourth turrets, anti-torpedo bulges similar to the British Queen Elizabeth-class battleships, and new anti-aircraft guns. Nearly two years after the modernization began, Almirante Latorre sailed back to Valparaíso on 5 March 1931 and put in on 12 April. Two 33-long-ton (34 t) tug boats, acquired for use in the harbors of Punta Arenas and Valparaíso, were carried on the battleship's deck during its voyage back to Chile.

=== 1931 mutiny ===
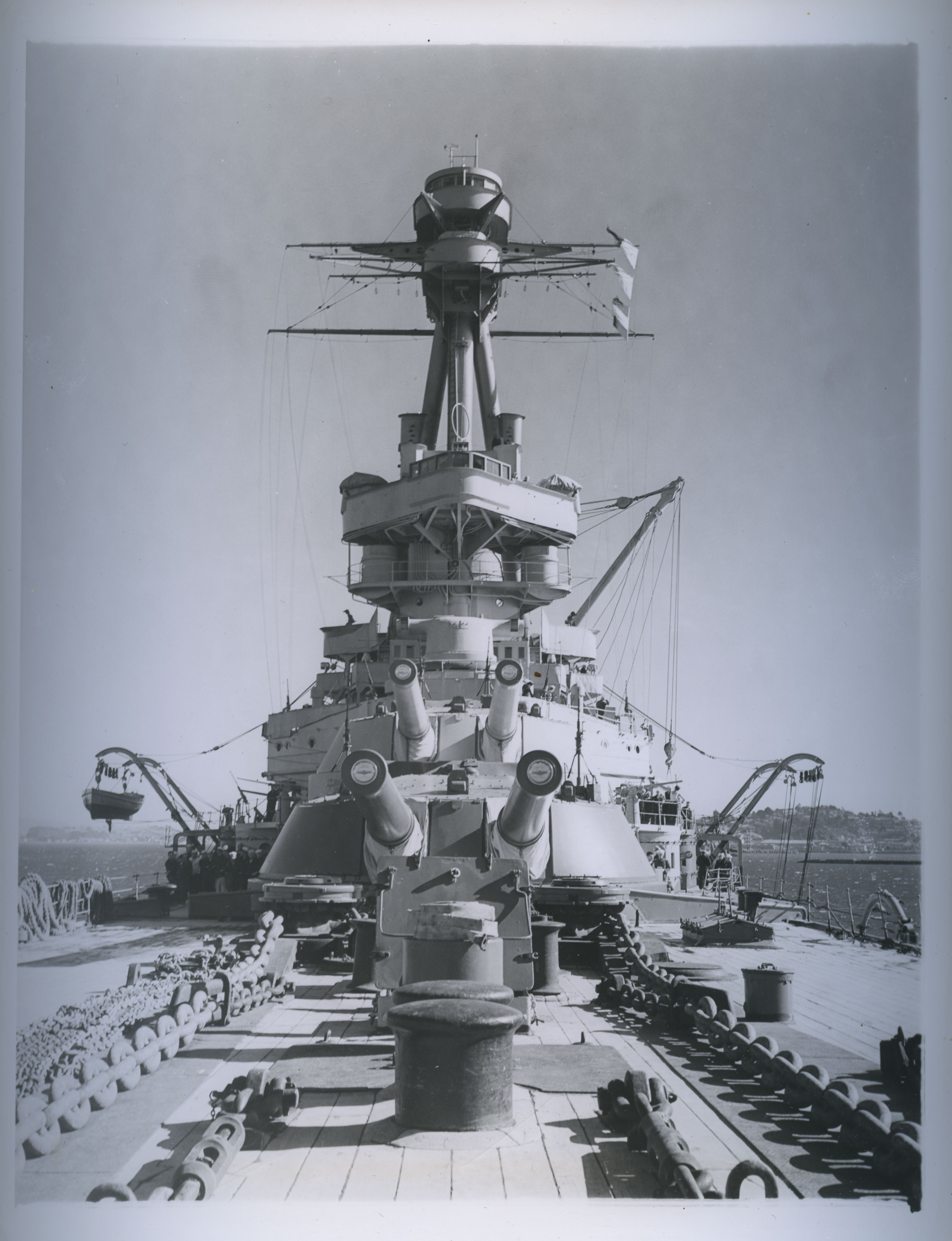
Almirante Latorre from the bow, date unknown.

Despite the goodwill brought on by the removal of the authoritarian President Carlos Ibáñez del Campo in July 1931, Chile could not overcome the Great Depression's severe economic effects, and wages for civil servants making over 3,000 pesos a year were cut by 12–30 percent to reduce government expenditures. This triggered a severe reaction among the sailors of the navy, who had already suffered a 10 percent salary cut and 50 percent loss in overseas bonuses. Various members of the crew on board Almirante Latorre, but no officers, met on 31 August and decided that a mutiny was the best course of action.

Shortly after midnight on 1 September, the junior crew members of Almirante Latorre, an armored cruiser (O'Higgins), seven destroyers, and a few submarines took over their ships while many of their shipmates were watching a boxing tournament in La Serena. They imprisoned the officers, most without conflict, and secured the ships by about 02:00. They elected a committee, the Estado Mayor de Tripulacion, to take control of the mutiny. Later that day, at 16:55, the mutineers radioed the minister of the navy, declaring that they were acting on their own accord, as opposed to acting in concert with a militant political party or communist insurgents. They asked for their full salaries to be restored and the punishment of those who had plunged Chile into a depression, while also stating that they would not use force to achieve these goals.

Just before midnight on 2 September, the mutineers messaged the Chilean government with a more "sophisticated" list of twelve demands. (Note: These demands included: [A reinstatement of] full pay for enlisted men.; The millionaires of Chile loan 300 million pesos to the government.; That all Government-owned uncultivated land be divided among the workmen.; That the government continue all public works.; That employment be provided for the unemployed.; That sailors be given a free clothing allowance.; That rations be improved.; That the ration include more sugar.; That navy-yard watchmen be replaced by sailors.; That contract pilots no longer be employed.; That service trade [officer] schools be closed for two years.; That retirement for enlisted men be optional at 15 years but compulsory at 20 years of service.) Meanwhile, further south, junior members of the navy in the main naval base of Talcahuano joined the mutiny, taking several vessels in the process. Several of these sailed north to join the other rebels, while two cruisers, a few destroyers and submarines remained to guard the base. Other bases joined the now-full-fledged rebellion as well, including the Second Air Group based in Quintero. With so many rebels appearing, it was feared by many that the plethora of unemployed workers would join. (Note: Indeed, massive strikes—led by the Communist Party's candidate for president, Elías Lafertte—were held in Valparaíso, and "the city appeared deserted" by 4 September.) The government attempted to solicit aid from the United States in the form of military intervention or war materiel (including two submarines and bombs capable of penetrating the armor of Almirante Latorre), but they were rebuffed both publicly and privately. Acting Vice President Manuel Trucco now found himself in an undesirable position; he had to defeat the rebels before more units joined and bolstered their forces, but if he was too harsh, there was a risk that the populace would think that his policies were too similar to the former dictator Ibáñez del Campo. Trucco decided on a path of reconciliation. He sent a naval admiral, Edgardo von Schroeders, to negotiate with the mutineers. They met on board Almirante Latorre, where von Schroeders, seeing a potential split between sailors angry over their pay versus others with a more political agenda, tried to divide them along these lines and get them to surrender. However, a plea from the approaching southern fleet, asking for them to wait before any possible settlement, sealed the matter for the time being and von Schroders flew back to the capital.

September marked a turn in the rebels' fortunes, despite the arrival of the southern fleet on 4 September. All of their land gains were taken by government forces, leaving only the fleet in the mutineers' hands. By the next day, an air strike was mounted by government forces. The only damage done was to the submarine H4, which was unable to dive, but at least one bomb landed about 50 yards (46 m) from Almirante Latorre. Despite the scant damage, the attack broke the mutineers' spirits; they quickly offered to send a delegation to Santiago to discuss terms, but the government, bolstered by its land victories, refused. While the mutiny devolved into arguing and anarchy, individual ships began leaving the bay and setting sail for Valparaíso, and the rest soon followed. Almirante Latorre ended up in the Bay of Tongoy with Blanco Encalada. Seven crewmen on the dreadnought received death sentences, later commuted to life in prison.

=== Later career ===
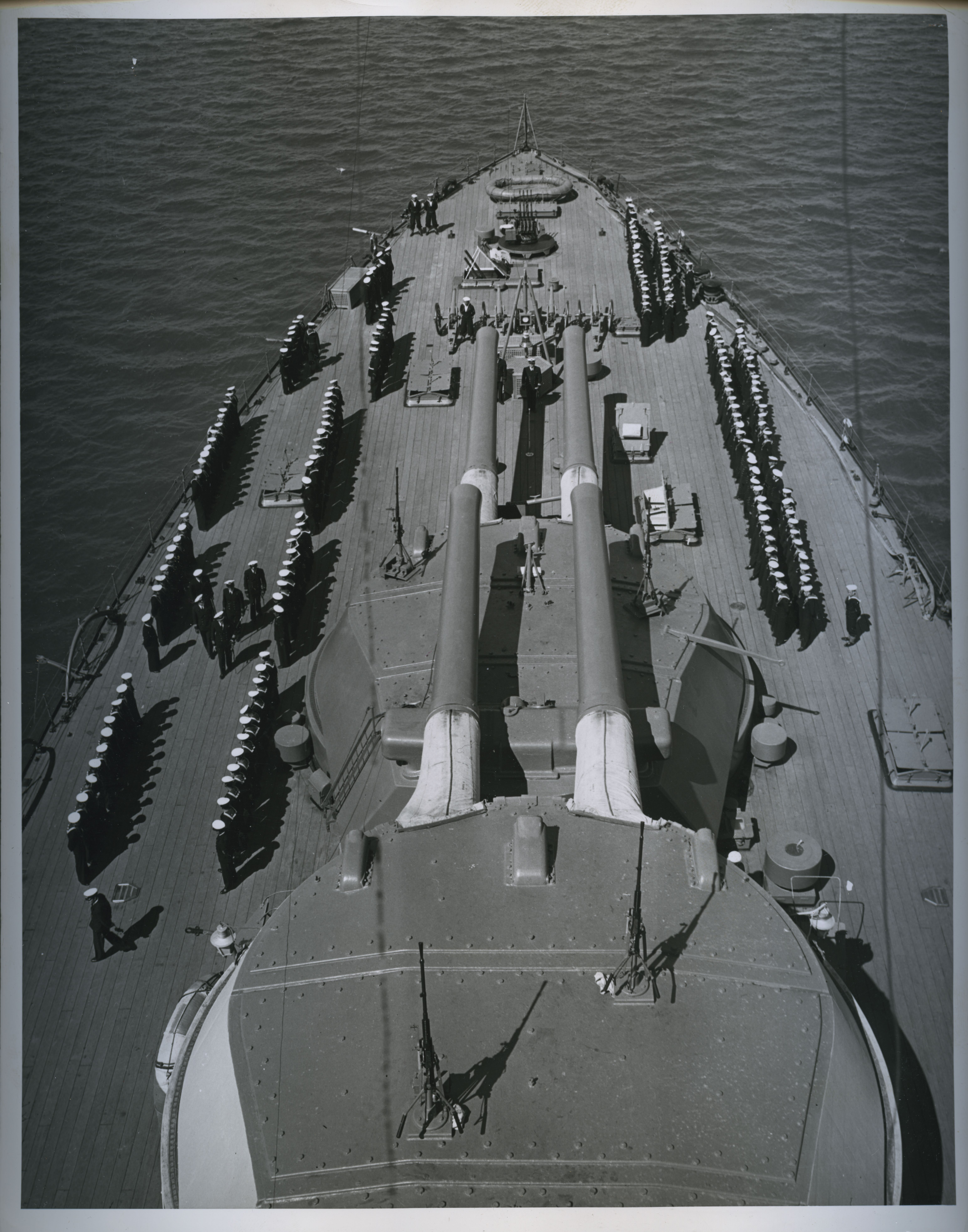
Looking down from Almirante Latorre's bridge on the bow turrets, date unknown.

Still in the midst of the depression, Almirante Latorre was deactivated at Talcahuano in 1933 to lessen government expenditures, and only a caretaker crew was assigned to tend to the mothballed ship into the mid-1930s. (Note: It is not clear when Almirante Latorre was reactivated. Scheina gives two possible years, 1935 or after the 1937 refit.) In a 1937 refit in the Talcahuano dockyard, the aircraft catapult was taken off and anti-aircraft weaponry was added. Almirante Latorre was never fully modernized, however, and by the Second World War its main battery was comparatively short-ranged and its armor protection, designed before the "all or nothing" principle was put into practice, was wholly inadequate. Nevertheless, in 1939, Soviet-affiliated purchasers considered making an offer to buy the ship, and soon after Japan's attack on Pearl Harbor, the United States Government approached the Chilean naval attaché and the vice admiral heading Chile's naval commission to the United States with the aim of purchasing Almirante Latorre and a few destroyers to bolster the United States Navy. Both of these offers were declined, and Almirante Latorre was used for neutrality patrols during the Second World War.

After a 1951 accident in Almirante Latorre's engine room killed three crewmen, the ship was kept moored in Talcahuano as a storage hulk for fuel oil. It was decommissioned in October 1958, and was sold to Mitsubishi Heavy Industries in February 1959 for $881,110 to be broken up for scrap. On 29 May 1959, to the salutes of the assembled Chilean fleet, the old dreadnought was taken under tow by the tug Cambrian Salvos, and reached Yokohama, Japan, at the end of August, (Note: Sources disagree as to the exact date. Whitley, The New York Times, and Burt give 28, 29, and 30 August, respectively.) though the scrapping process did not begin immediately on arrival. A large number of parts from Almirante Latorre were used in the restoration of the Mikasa, which had seen substantial alterations and badly deteriorated after World War II.
