= Tongoy Bay =

Bay in Chile

- Bahía de Tongoy
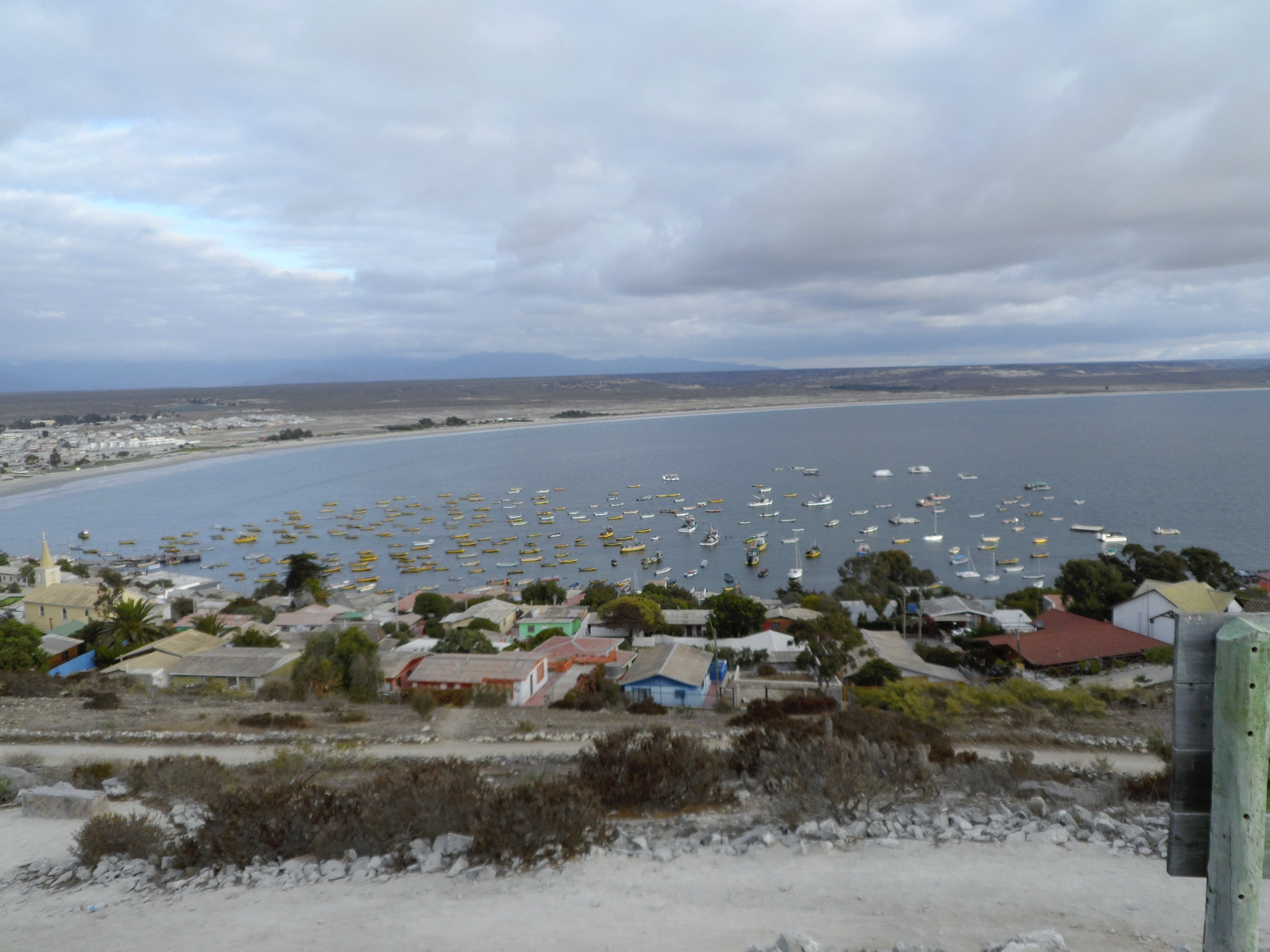
- Fishing boats on Tongoy Bay.

- Location off the coast of Chile
- Location: Coquimbo Region; Chile
- Coordinates: 30°16′2.94″S 71°33′32.46″W
- Type: Oceanic bay
- Primary outflows: Pacific Ocean
- Basin countries: Chile
- Settlements: Tongoy, Puerto Aldea

Tongoy Bay (Spanish: Bahía de Tongoy) is a bay in Chile's Coquimbo Region. The bay is U-shaped, open to the north. Its western boundary is made up by the hilly and north-protruding Point Lengua de Vaca. More in detail the west boundary of the bay is made up of a seismic fault known as Puerto Aldea Fault. On the shores of the bay lie the towns of Tongoy and Puerto Aldea and their respective beaches. Tongoy Bay is site of recurrent upwelling of cold, acidic and oxygen-poor seawater. Oysters are cultivated in Tongoy Bay.

Guanaqueros Bay lies a few kilometers north of Tongoy Bay being separated by the coastal mountain of Cerro Guanaquero.
