= 14 inch gun =

14 inch gun may refer to a number of 14 inch (355.6 mm) caliber naval guns of the 1900s - 1940s:

- 14"/45 caliber gun : US gun of World War I and World War II
- EOC 14 inch /45 naval gun : British gun of World War I later used by Chile
- 14"/50 caliber gun : US gun of World War I and World War II
- Vickers 14 inch/45 naval gun : gun used by Japan in World War I and World War II
- BL 14 inch Mk VII naval gun : British gun of World War II
- 14"/50 caliber railway gun
