= Point Lengua de Vaca =

Coordinates: 30°14′17″S 71°37′38″W

Point Lengua de Vaca

Point Lengua de Vaca (Spanish: Punta Lengua de Vaca) is a northward headland on the coast of the Coquimbo Region south of the city of Coquimbo in Chile. To the east of Point Lengua de Vaca lies Tongoy Bay.
