= Víctor Domingo Silva =

Chilean writer (1882-1960)

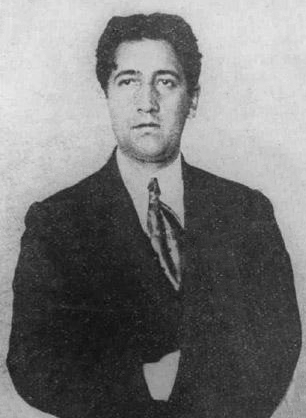
Víctor Domingo Silva

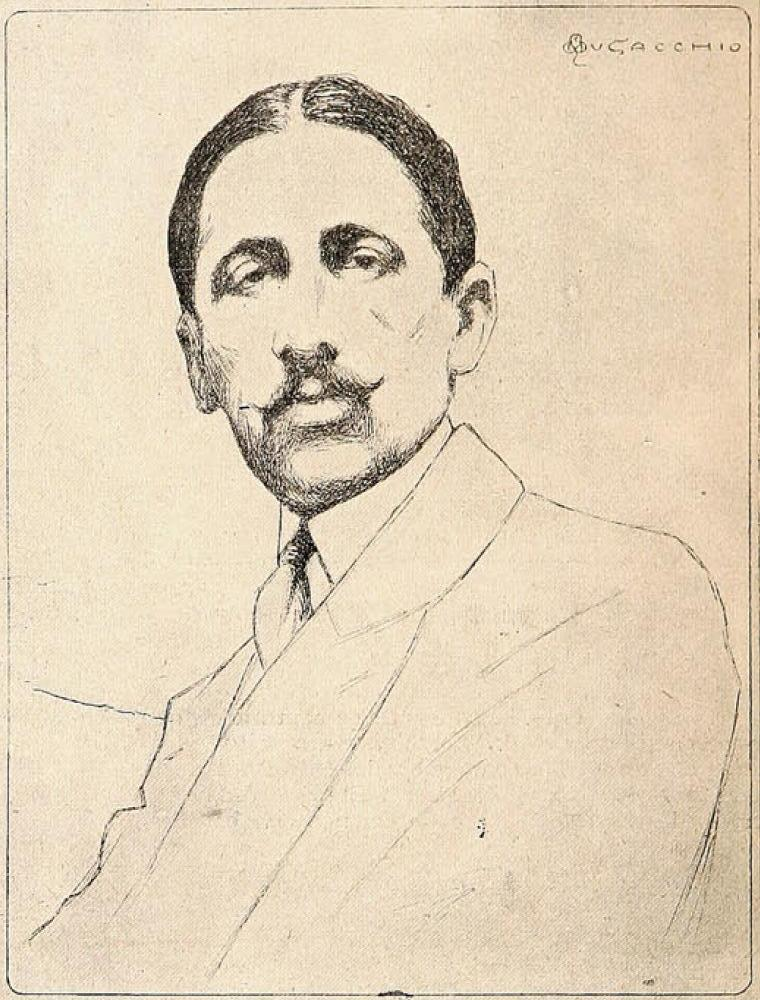
Víctor Domingo Silva in 1908

Víctor Domingo Silva Endeiza (May 12, 1882, Tongoy, Elqui Province – August 20, 1960, Santiago) was a Chilean poet, journalist, playwright and writer. He was of Basque descent by mother's side.

Silva was born into an educated family that instilled in him a love of literature. In 1906, he was elected diputado (deputy) (a member of the lower house of Chile's bicameral Congress) of the provinces of Copiapó, Freirina and Chañaral. During his tenure as Deputy, Silva began publishing poetry in El Mercurio, a well-known newspaper centered in the Valparaíso region.

He was dubbed "el poeta nacional" ("the national poet") since he dedicated a significant portion of his poetry to national topics, including his celebrated patriotic poem, La Bandera ("The Flag"). Silva entered the diplomatic corps in 1928 and was posted to Patagonia in Argentina, where he was a driving force behind the establishment of the Chilean province of Aisén. Later he was appointed consul general of Chile, and was posted to Madrid where he remained for several years, finally returning to Chile in 1948. In 1954, Chile's national award for literature was bestowed upon him.

== Selected poems ==
- Adolescencia (1906)
- Golondrina de invierno (1912)
- Palomilla brava (1923)
- El alma de Chile (1928), antología poética
- El mestizo Alejo (1934)
- Poemas de Ultramar (1935)
- El cachorro (1937)
- La Criollita

== Selected plays ==
- El Rey de la Araucanía (1936)
- Aún no se ha puesto el sol (1950)
- La tempestad se avecina
- El hombre de la casa
