= Guanaqueros =

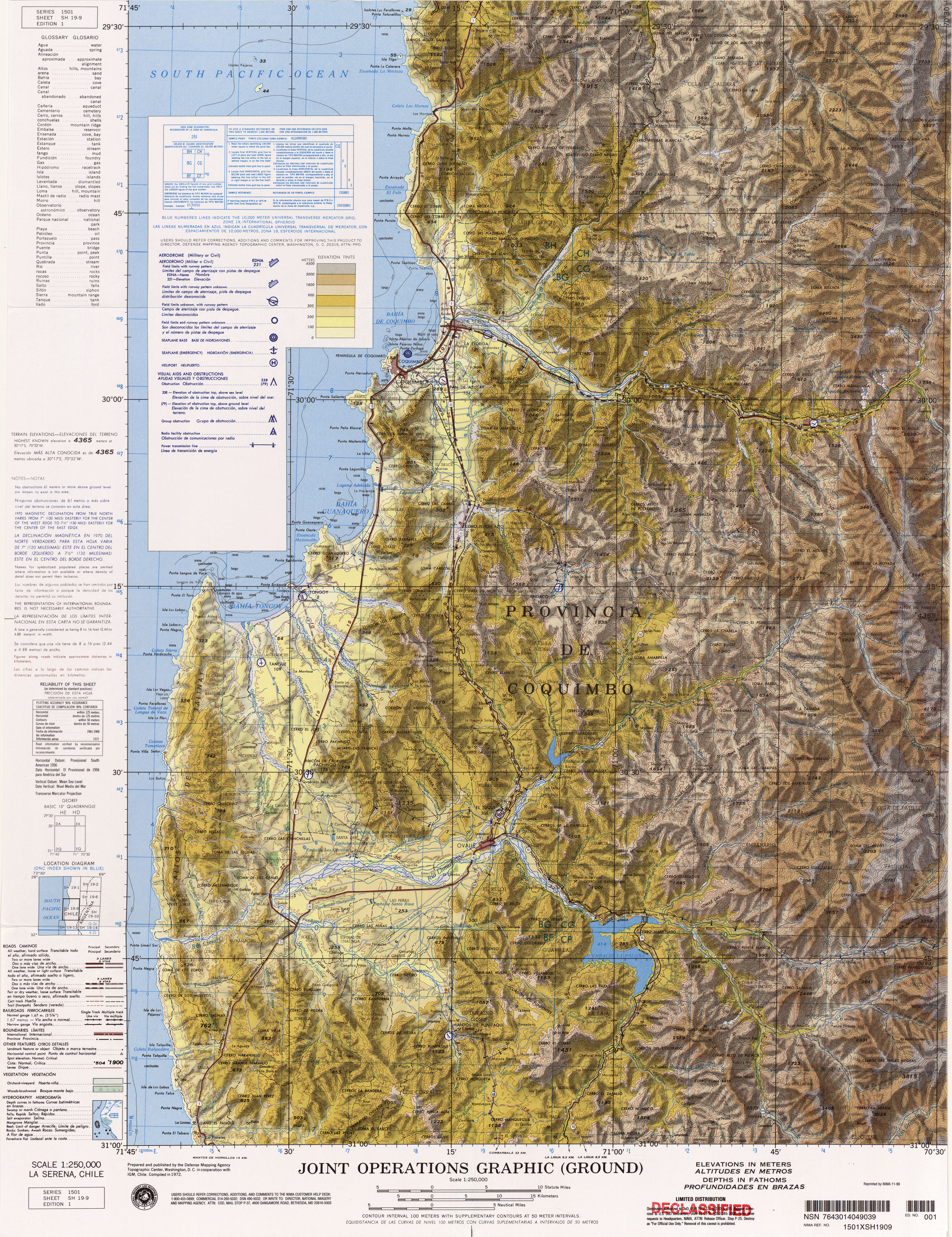
Guanaqueros beach in Coquimbo

Guanaqueros is a Chilean town in the commune of Coquimbo, Elqui Province, Coquimbo Region. It is located in Guanaqueros Bay, 12 kilometers northeast from Tongoy. It is a fishermen's cove, which spreads along the eastern rim of the Cerro Guanaqueros ("Guanaqueros Hills"), and with its houses built facing to the north in the direction of the Pacific Ocean.

Guanaqueros is situated next to an extensive ocean harbor of the same name, where dozens of recreation centers are located, along with inns, hostels and other accommodations for the tourist industry. The town lies next to the Carretera Panamericana ("Pan-American Highway") and, according to the 2002 census, it has a population of 1,395 inhabitants.

The town's first inhabitants were the Diaguitas, who lived off the ocean and who mined and made tools from the area's copper deposits.

== See also ==
- List of towns in Chile

30°16′2.94″S 71°33′32.46″W
