= Guanaqueros Bay =

Bay in Chile

- Bahía de Guanaqueros
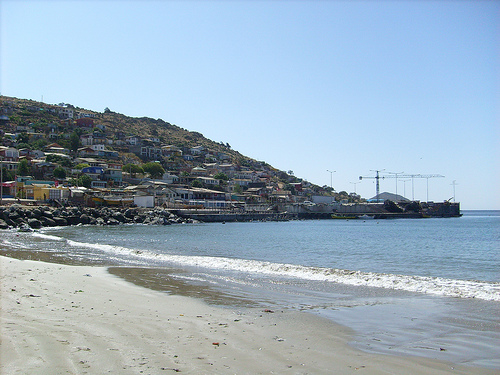
- Town of Guanaqueros in Guanaqueros Bay.

- Location off the coast of Chile
- Location: Coquimbo Region; Chile
- Coordinates: 30°10′37.11″S 71°24′53.81″W
- Type: Oceanic bay
- Primary outflows: Pacific Ocean
- Basin countries: Chile
- Settlements: Guanaqueros

Guanaqueros Bay (Spanish: Bahía de Guanaqueros) is a bay in Chile's Coquimbo Region. The bay is U-shaped, open to the northwest. Its western boundary is made up by Punta Guanaquero, a spur of Cerro Guanaqueros. The beach of Guanaros Bay lies about 34 km south of the port city of Coquimbo. The area around the bay has a cold desert climate.
