= Tongoy =

Coastal town in Coquimbo, Chile

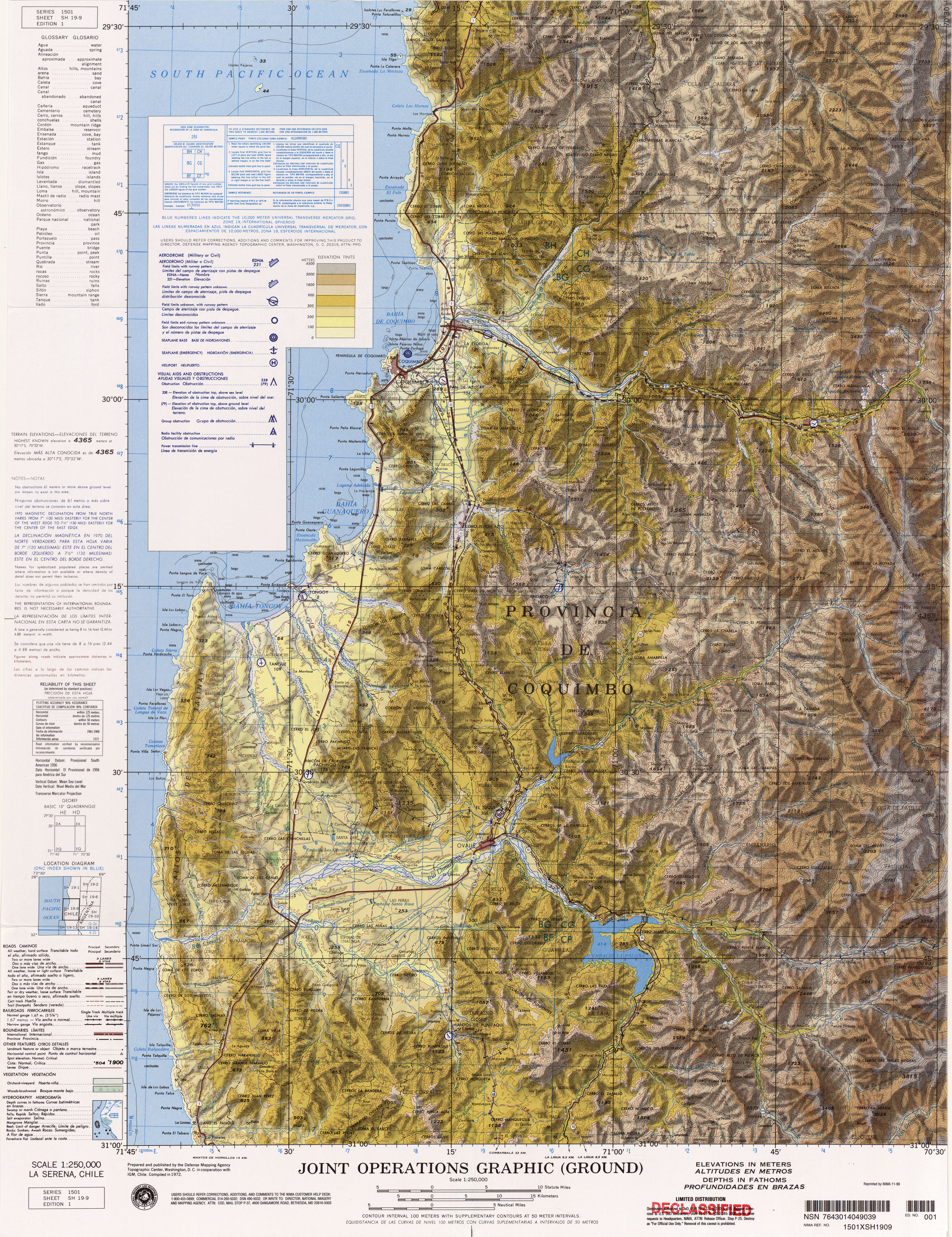
Tongoy's hinterland

Tongoy is a Chilean coastal town in the commune of Coquimbo in Elqui Province, Coquimbo Region. It is located 42 km (26 mi) to the south of Chile's second oldest city, La Serena, next to Guanaqueros beach, on a rocky promontory opposite the Pacific Ocean, between the beaches of Socos (4 km) and Grande (26 km), to the north of the Talinay Mountain range.

Tongoy's geographical coordinates are 30°15′27″S 71°29′33″W and, according to a 2002 census conducted by the National Statistics Institute, has a population of 4,435 inhabitants. Tongoy's residential areas are divided into two areas: the Peninsula, a zone of summer houses, called popularly "La Isla" ("The Island") and the Pueblo Bajo (Low Village), where the majority of permanent inhabitants reside.

Tongoy's most famous former resident is the late poet Víctor Domingo Silva, referred to as "el poeta nacional" ("the national poet"). The house where he was born and lived is situated opposite the former local school. A large public park named after Silva, is located in the highest area of the peninsula. The park offers a good vantage point from which to view the bay and surrounding areas.

== History ==
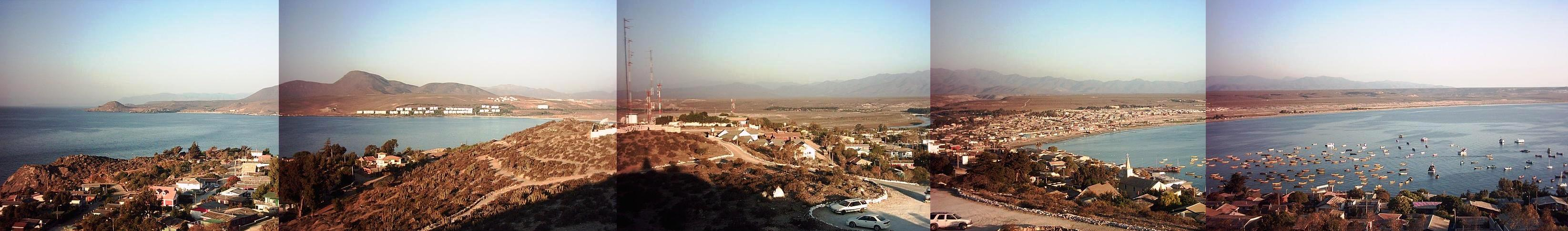
Tongoy as seen from the Víctor Domingo Silva Park

The town's name comes from the word Tongoy which in Mapudungún means "hammer strikes". The first inhabitants of the Tongoy area were the Diaguitas and the Changos. Over many years the Diaguitas exploited the rich copper deposits of the region, mining, making tools and all manner of implements from the metal. They also were industrious farmers and developed agriculture throughout the territory. The Changos, by contrast, were a nomadic fishing culture making their living from the ocean in distinctive rafts made with sea lion leather stretched over a wooden platform, which could transport anywhere between one and four sailors. The Changos fished exclusively with bone harpoons which they moored to their bodies with leather cords.

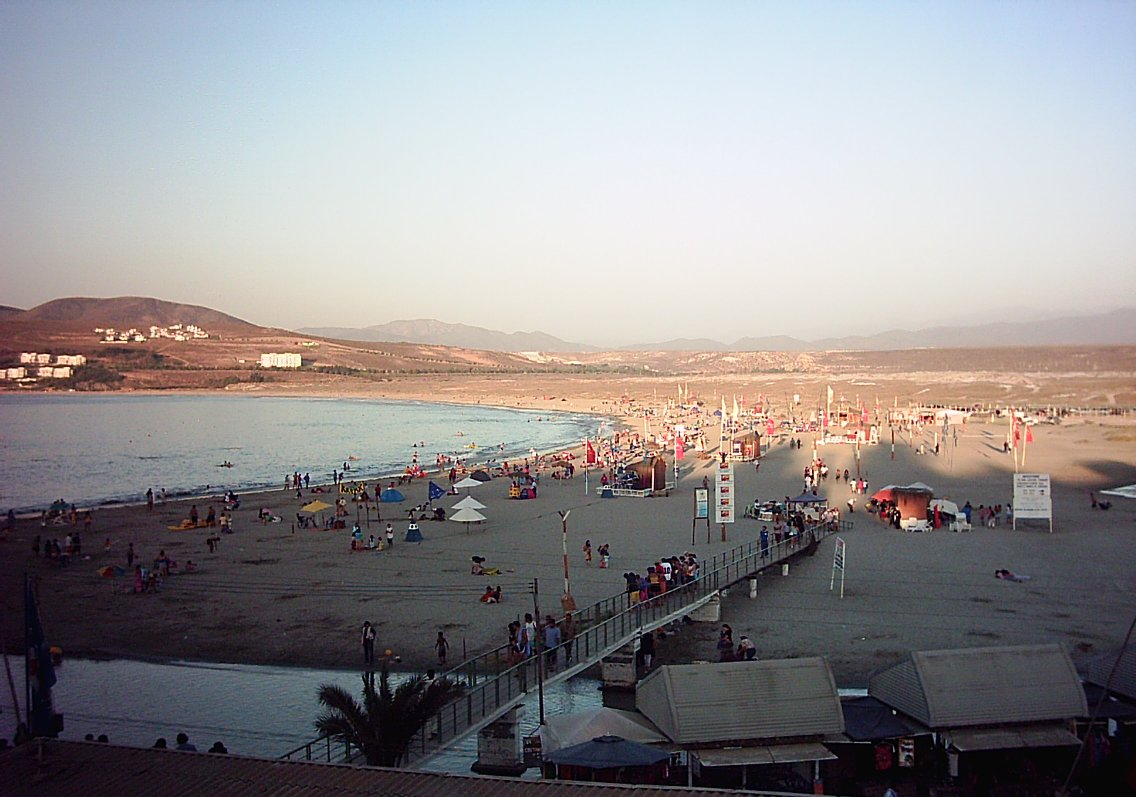
The Playa Socos or Playa Chica beach in Tongoy.

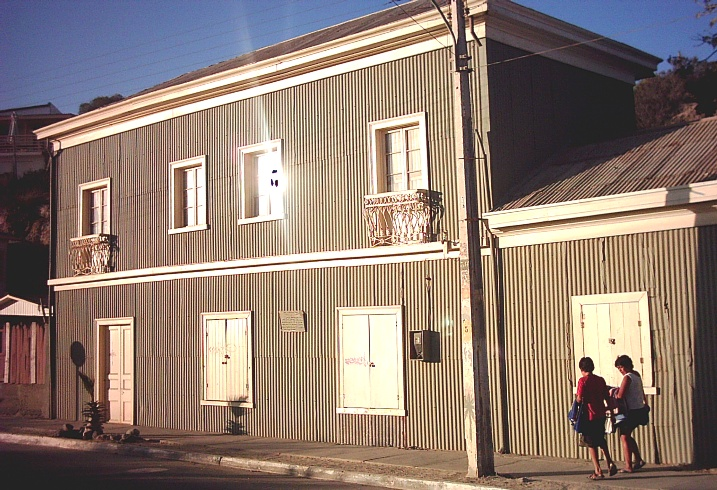
The house where poet Víctor Domingo Silva was born

Until the mid-1970s it was possible to find arrowheads and other artifacts of indigenous pottery; specially in the contiguous dunes of Playa Grande ("Great Beach"), in the direction of Puerto Aldea ("Aldea Port").

During colonial times, the Bay of Tongoy was a place of welcome for hundreds of small fishermen, whaling privateers and, a place to anchor before or after passing the port of Coquimbo. Historical documents record that in 1687 the area was host to a battle between La Serena's militia against a group of disembarked buccaneers who attempted to conquer the town. Legend has it that the area was a possible interment site of Francis Drake's mythical treasure. In 1835, the captain of the British Navy, Robert FitzRoy, commanding the H.M.S. Beagle, made a complete survey of the bay.

Tongoy was an important port during the height of copper production from the mine of Tamaya, an ancient mine located 25 km to the north of the city of Ovalle, near the slopes of the Andes mountain range. On November 21, 1839, Chile's then President, José Joaquín Prieto Vial decreed the port a puerto habilitado (qualified port). The following year, in 1840, regular shipments of copper and other minerals from the cove began to the provinces of Combarbalá and Limarí.

In 1850, under the auspices of Jose Tomás Urmeneta, a wealthy Chilean industrialist, Tongoy was provided with a railroad to bring mineral ore from outlying areas. During this same period, construction of a ships' wharf was initiated, as well as the construction of a large smelting oven by Enrique Barnes to extract copper from chalcopyrite ore.

=== Modern times ===
During the 20th century, Tongoy became a popular coastal town. Much urbanization took place from 1955 to the present, with the addition of many stately houses, parks and a number of tennis venues. In the 1980s, institutional resort areas were constructed especially for the use of Chile's National Police Force (Carabineros de Chile) and Air Force (Fuerza Aérea de Chile).

In 1982 a marine biology laboratory was established on the peninsula which was underwritten and remains dependent on the Fundación Chile, a government-backed foundation launched in 1976 with the collaboration and funding of the American company, ITT, which is dedicated to developing technological innovation and growth in Chile, as well as with the support of the association of local fishermen. The laboratory focuses on techniques in commercialized seafood productions.

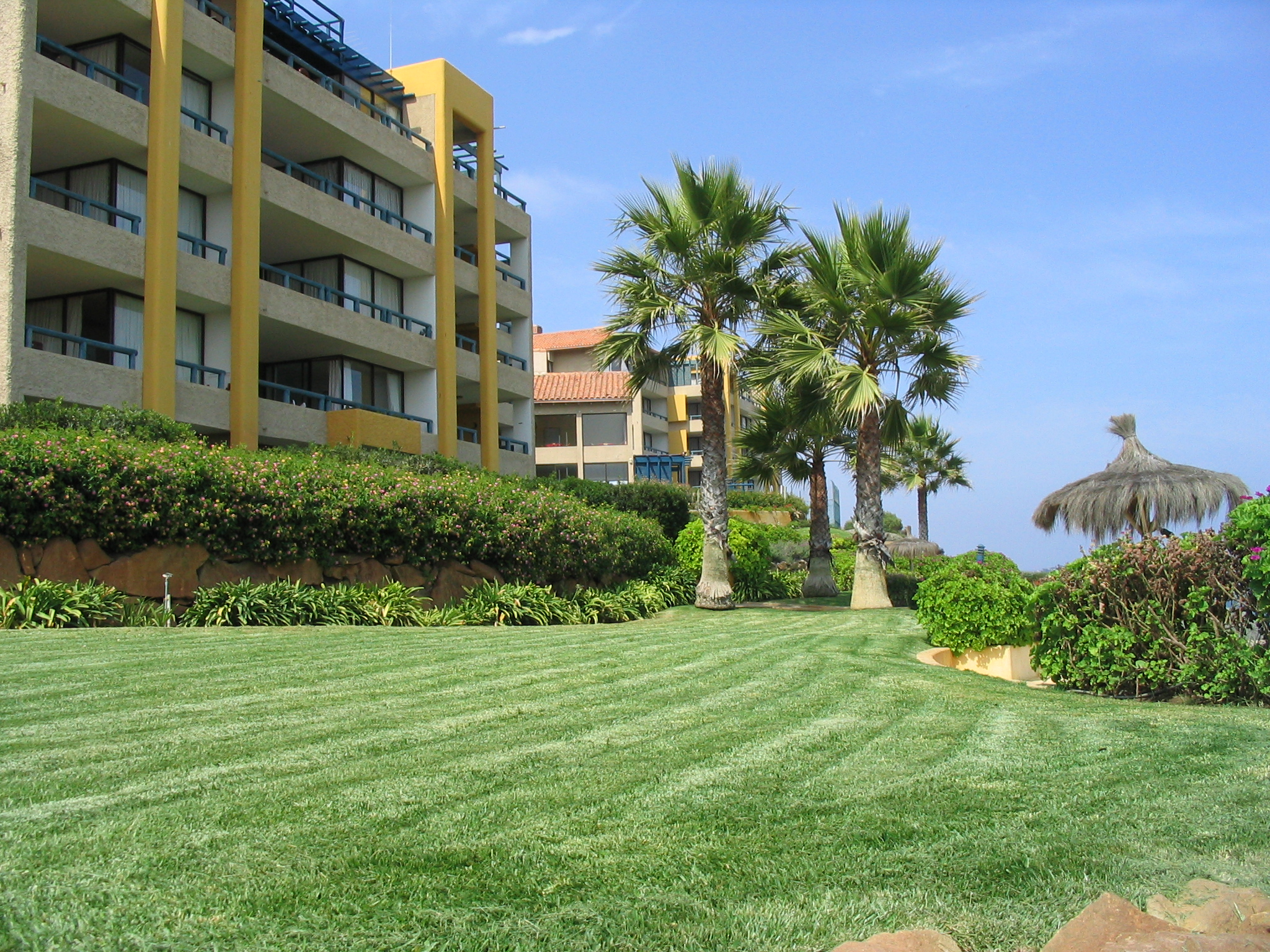
Touristic development.

Tongoy's economy relies heavily on the tourist industry and its related restaurant trade. Hotel complexes and tourist rentals complement the town's beaches and sealife. Tongoy is especially crowded during the southern summer (December, January and February) with visitors from nearby cities such as La Serena, Coquimbo and Ovalle, and also from Chile's capital, Santiago, which is approximately a 4-hour drive from Tongoy. Vacationers also visit from nearby Argentina—especially from the provinces of San Juan and Mendoza.

The majority of Tongoy's residents work seasonally, during the heavy tourist trade period occurring annually between January and February. Another large source of local employment is in the seafood factories which package and export a variety of fish and shellfish products, chiefly using sole, turbot, eastern oyster and macha (Mesodesma donacium a surf clam peculiar to Chile). The agro-industrial sector is concentrated in the Hacienda el Tangue area of Tongoy (250 inhabitants), next to the village of Puerto Aldea (50 inhabitants).

Puerto Aldea is the site of an ancient Chilean Navy base. Today, UNITAS naval exercises, with the participation of the United States, are conducted at the location during spring months (UNITAS is a 1960 established, annual, multinational naval deployment exercise in which United States Navy vessels circumnavigate the South American continent, participating in maneuvers with local navies). The section is also home to a lighthouse, a new pier for local fishermen, and is known for the excellence of goatcheese produced by the locals. In 2002, destruction of land mines was carried out in the segregated naval area, in accordance with the Treaty of Ottawa.

=== Administrative designation ===
Prior to 1894, Tongoy was an autonomous commune, however in 1929 it was incorporated into the Department (an administrative division) of Ovalle. During the 1970s, during a regionalization redistricting campaign, Tongoy was integrated into the Province of Elqui, thus becoming part of the commune of Coquimbo. At present, Today Tongoy remains a part of the Commune of Coquimbo, and it is technically administered as a delegación municipal (municipal delegation).

=== Recent history ===
During January, 2006, Chile's undersecretary of Regional Development, Adriana Delpiano, announced that "no veía con malos ojos a Tongoy como comuna" (she looked favorably on making Tongoy a discrete commune). Soon thereafter, Chile's President, Ricardo Lagos announced a government project that would create the Commune of Tongoy, granting the Tongoy area long-sought autonomy by administratively separating it from Coquimbo. But as of 2012 no significant progress has been made in that direction.

In September 2015 a tsunami from the Coquimbo earthquake destroyed "large parts of the sea front" in the town.

== Places of interest ==
- Playa Socos: a 4.8 kilometer white sand beach.
- Playa Grande: an extensive beach running 26 kilometers along Chile's coast.
- Humedales de Pachingo (also called Tongoy): an undeveloped area protected by the Chile's Ministry of National Assets as a government protected nature preserve under the international Ramsar Convention. It is considered an excellent spot for birdwatching.
- Poet, Víctor Domingo Silva's home, where he was born and lived for many years.
- Víctor Domingo Silva Park: Located at the top of the peninsula, from which grand views of the area are possible. In its highest part there is a statue of the Virgin Mary and Baby Jesus crowned by a cross.
- Hacienda el Tangue: a country estate collectivized during Chile's agrarian reform movement. It is administered by an efficient growers' co-operative and produces various cheeses, among other agricultural products.
- Puerto Aldea: A small, quaint village located to the south of Playa Grande.
- Bosque de Fray Jorge National Park, located about 40 km (25 mi) South from Tongoy, has been declared a World Biosphere Reserve by UNESCO.
- Conchales de Pachingo: an area with abundant mollusc shells.
- Puerto Velero and Playa Blanca: hotel complexes and rental departments located at the head of Socos beach, which provide a variety of attractions and services for tourists.
