= EOC 14-inch 45-calibre naval gun =

Elswick 14 inch 45-calibre naval gun
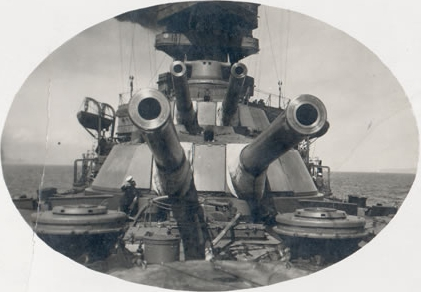
- Forward guns of Almirante Latorre
- Type: Naval gun
- Place of origin: United Kingdom

Service history
- In service: 1915–1958
- Used by: United Kingdom; Chile
- Wars: World War I

Production history
- Designer: Elswick Ordnance Company

Specifications
- Barrel length: Bore 52 ft 6 in (16.002 m) (45 cal)
- Shell: HE 1,586 lb (719.40 kg) 4 c.r.h. (later 1,400 lb (635.03 kg) 8 c.r.h.)
- Calibre: 14-inch (355.6 mm)
- Elevation: Naval: 0° - 20° Railway: 0 - 40°
- Muzzle velocity: 2,450 ft/s (747 m/s) (1,586 lb shell); 2,600 ft/s (792 m/s) (1,400 lb shell)
- Effective firing range: At 20° elevation 22.3 Km, with 640 kg shell at 40° elevation 34.7 Km

The BL 14 inch 45 calibre gun were various similar naval guns designed and manufactured by Elswick Ordnance Company to equip ships that Armstrong-Whitworth built and/or armed for several countries before World War I.

== History ==
When World War I began, Armstrong-Whitworth were building the battleship Almirante Latorre for Chile, armed with 10 of its 14-inch guns. The battleship was acquired by the British government and completed as HMS Canada and served in the Royal Navy in World War I, with its guns designated BL 14 inch Mk I.

After World War I the battleship was sold to Chile as Almirante Latorre as originally intended.

== Railway guns ==
Elswick built several guns for Japan which went into British service as railway guns in World War I under the designation BL 14 inch Mk III. They were similar to but lighter than Mk I, and were modified to give similar performance as Mk I.

=== Weapons of comparable role, performance and era ===
- 14"/45 caliber gun US equivalent
- Vickers 14 inch/45 naval gun Vickers/Japanese equivalent
