= Great Depression in Latin America =

The Great Depression in Latin America heavily affected the region in the 1930s after the Great Depression had spread globally since the stock market crash of 1929 on Wall Street.

The Great Depression saw change in Latin America's governments, their economic policies and the nations' economic performance. It is initiated by the economic decline of the American and British economy which later caused the economic declines of Latin American countries because they relied on Britain and the United States for investment in the region's economies and their demand for the region's exports.

The rise in fascist governments was brought on by nationalist desires during the Great Depression, as was demonstrated by the Vargas government in Brazil which ruled from 1930 to 1945. The period saw a further shift in government economic policies in Latin America, such as in Argentina, in efforts to adjust their economies to recover from the Depression. Latin American countries that were economically impacted by the Depression included Brazil, Cuba, Chile, Mexico, and Peru.

== Background ==
The Great Depression, which followed the Wall Street Crash of 1929, had extreme negative effects on the countries of Latin America.

Chile, Peru, and Bolivia were, according to a League of Nations report, the countries that were the worst hit by the Depression. The rise of fascism also became apparent in Latin America in the 1930s because of the Great Depression. Fascist governments were the result of nationalistic desires, which were exploited by rulers such as Getúlio Vargas of Brazil. Haiti came out of the Great Depression as a fully-independent country since the United States ended the military occupation of the country in 1936.

Brazil was also hit hard by the Depression. Between 1929 and 1932, coffee exports fell 50%. Foreign investment in the country was reduced to zero. To keep coffee prices from falling even more, in 1931 the government ordered the dumping of thousands of coffee sacks into the ocean. Entire coffee plantations had their production bought by the government and set on fire to reduce production and to keep prices from hitting rock bottom, which would have caused many bankruptcies. Sugar production became so cheap that many sugar mills in the country halted all production for years.

In other Latin American countries like Mexico, responses to the Depression also included an increase in industrialization, which had begun during the 19th century.

== Peru ==
Peru's economy, prior to the Depression, specialized in exports and relied on US loans to fund public finance. As a result, Peru's economy was affected by a decrease in export revenue during the Depression. The country's exports decreased in the early onset of the Depression by 72% between 1929 and 1932. Peru's exports were cut from US$132 million in 1929 to US$38 million in 1932. Peru's imports also declined from US$76 million in 1929 to US$16 million in 1932.

The Depression also saw a decrease in employment in the sugar and mining sectors. Field labor in sugar industry was 20,000 in 1932, a decrease of 6,000 from 1928.

In the mining sector, blue-collar employment fell from 25,000 in 1929 to 13,000 in 1932, and white-collar employment from 3000 in 1929 to 1000 in 1932. The poor performance of exports and imports contributed to an unstable balance of payments, as was demonstrated by the Peruvian government's suspension of the payment of Peru's foreign debt in March 1931.

However, the impact of the Depression on trade levels lasted less than 10 years, as Peru's exports of cotton, lead, and zinc had returned to 1929 levels by 1937.

== Mexico ==
Mexico's economy experienced a decline in the early onset of the great Depression because of its close ties with the US, which experienced an economic collapse after the Wall Street Crash in 1929.

The early effects of the Depression on Mexico were directly felt by the mining sector in which the overall export price index fell by 32% from 1929 to 1932. The real value of Mexican exports fell by 75%, and the outputs by 21%, and the external terms of trade fell by 50% between 1928 and 1932. The value of Mexican exports fell more than those of Brazil, which during that period declined by 44%, but less than those of Chile, whose exports fell by 83%.

However, it is argued that the decline in demand for exports had a less severe impact on Mexico since other countries' exports made up a larger percentage of their GDP like in Chile. Exports made up only 12% of Mexico's GDP, much smaller than the proportions in Chile (30%) and Argentina (27%).

Mexico's primary exports of commodities included silver and oil, which were less affected than other Latin American exports by the Depression, as they are not associated with the labour-intensive industry; Therefore, they were less affected by the fall in foreign earnings. Mexico's primary export of silver further benefited from US funding of silver through the American Silver Purchase Act of 1934, which led to a rise in the value of silver exports.

The Depression also saw a gradual rise towards the 1921 Mexican oil production levels during the 1930s that was assisted by sustained oil prices and strong demand for oil. Between 1932 and 1935, oil output expanded from 33 million barrels to 40 million as a result of a new oil-field in Poza Rica. During the same period in which Mexican oil and silver exports increased, Mexico's exports overall almost doubled to a value of US$208 million by 1935.

In terms of Mexico's consumer industries, they initially experienced a decreased demand from the early onset of the Depression in 1929 to 1931, but after 1931, a decrease in global export earnings reduced Mexico imports. That encouraged domestic purchases and led to the recovery of Mexico's domestic industry.

Mexico's economic growth after 1931 was driven by import substitution and income that was produced by the manufacturing industry by the opportunities of demand for domestic industries in Mexico as a result of the global decline of export-led growth from the Depression. Alongside the benefits stipulated by the economic growth, which was driven by import substitution, the lack of foreign exchange benefited the recovery of Mexico's aggregate supply.

Although imports were half of pre-Depression levels, those characteristics of the Mexican economy, which were adjusted during early onset of the Depression, provided circumstances in which the declining growth had shifted to a gradual rise by 1935.

== Chile ==
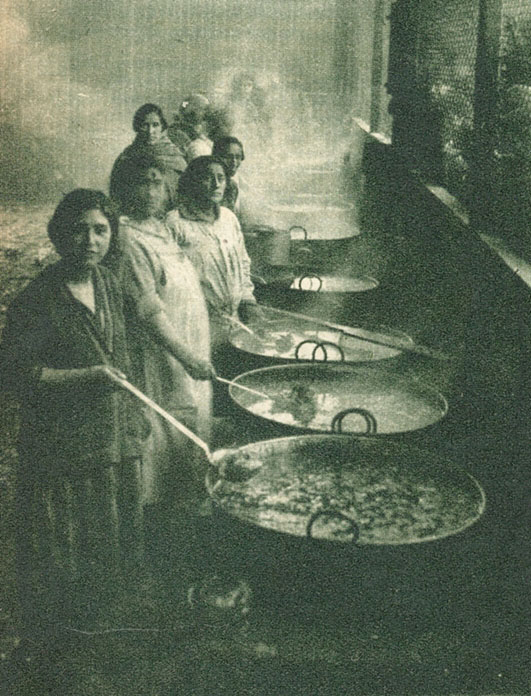
A soup kitchen feeds the unemployed in 1932.

The Chilean economy, according to the perspective presented by the calculations of the League of Nations, was that the country that was most severely impacted by the economic collapse characterised by the Great Depression.

The economic devastation worsened Chile's economic prosperity, as was highlighted particularly in 1932 that exemplified a rapid fall in exports, imports, the GDP, and the value of industrialisation production from pre-Depression levels. Chiles exports dropped from US$279m in 1929 to US$35m in 1932, which in real terms corresponds to a sixth of the exports of 1929. During that time period, Chile's imports fell from US$197m in 1929 to US$26m in 1932. Similarly, real GDP dropped from 100 in 1929 to 67 in 1932, which was caused by the fall of the value of production from 100 in 1929 to 77 in 1932 and a rapid decrease in the average annual production that reached the equivalent to a quarter of 1929 levels in December 1932.

Chile's economic struggles during the Depression were further compounded by a decrease of foreign loans. That contributed to an increase in Chile's budget deficit and reduced government revenue because of its pre-Depression heavy reliance on foreign financial support, particularly from the US, to drive economic growth. Chile in 1929 received a total of US$338 million of foreign loans but in 1932 received only US$23 million. During the same period, Chile's budget deficit rose from 31% of total expenditure in 1931 to 37% in 1932.

During the same time period, Chile's sluggish economy was further shown by the rising unemployment and the decrease in the production of nitrate. A decrease in employment in Chile's mining sector is exemplified by the number of workers in 1932 standing at less than a third of 1929 figures of 91,000. More specifically, in the nitrate sector alone, 50,000 workers had become unemployed by 1932.

Along With a decrease in employment in the mining sector, in terms of GDP and productive activity, mining dropped to 26.3 in 1932 from the 1929 level of 100.

High rates of unemployment, which were caused by a fragile export economy saw an increase in geographical mobility of the working class, were exemplified between September 1930 to February in 1931 during which 46,459 people left nitrate fields to the main cities of Chile such as Santiago and provincial cities.

Thus, the working class was primarily subject to the social consequences, such as poverty, created by the rise in unemployment and the deterioration of mining exports, particularly nitrate, during the Depression. Working-class struggle combined with economic decline to lead to the printing of more money by Chilean President Juan Antonio Montero in April 1932. That allowed the government to pay 152 million pesos towards government expenses, public works, and public aid for the unemployed.

== Cuba ==
The onset of the Great Depression in Cuba, which was triggered by the US economic crisis of 1929, compounded political instability, political opposition to Machado's dictatorship, societal unrest, poverty, and economic decline.

Cuba's economic decline during the Depression is demonstrated by the fall in Cuban sugar prices and revenue in which the sugar industry accounted for 80-90% of national agricultural production. During Machado's regime (1925-1933), Cuba's sugar was heavily reliant on American investment and loans. Thus, the US stock market crash and economic crisis of 1929 contributed to a fall in export revenue and employment that was largely tied to Cuba's sugar industry. Prior to the onset of the 1929 wall street crash, Cuban sugar prices in 1929 had been an average of 2.96 cents per pound sugar prices dropped to nearly half of 1927 prices, at 1.47 cents per pound.

This fall in Cuban sugar prices not only impacted national revenue but also contributed to an increase in unemployment, as sugar mills began to close down. By 1933 there were only 125 active mills, a drop from 163 mills active in 1929. The decline of Cuban sugar production, prices, and export revenue further stipulated low wages and poor conditions, as was affirmed by the British embassy in Havana in 1933, which presented the average Cuban sugar worker wage to be 25 cents for each 10-11-hour workday.

In addition to Cuba's sugar industry, the country's economy further suffered from a decline in tourism revenue during the Depression since tourism fell from 26 million in 1928–1929 to below $5 million in 1933–1934. These features of the Depression of low wages, increased unemployment, low sugar prices, decreased export revenue, and a fall in tourism revenue are reflected in the fall of national income from 708 million pesos in 1925 to 294 million in 1933. Furthermore, the economic decline contributed political instability and a shift in political power, which were highlighted by Machado's resignation on 12 August 1933.
