= Agincourt =

Agincourt may refer to:

- Battle of Agincourt, a major English victory in the Hundred Years' War, at Azincourt, France

== Places ==
- Agincourt, Meurthe-et-Moselle, a commune in France
- Agincourt, Mpumalanga, a town in South Africa
- Agincourt, Toronto, a neighbourhood in Ontario, Canada
  - Agincourt Collegiate Institute, a secondary school in Toronto
  - Agincourt District Library, a Toronto Public Library branch
  - Agincourt GO Station, a railway station in Toronto, Canada
  - Agincourt Junior Public School, an elementary school in Toronto
  - Agincourt Mall, a retail mall in Toronto
  - CPR Toronto Yard, also known as Agincourt Yard, a railway marshalling yard in Toronto
  - Scarborough—Agincourt, a federal electoral riding and city ward in Toronto
  - Scarborough—Agincourt (provincial electoral district), a provincial riding in Toronto
- Agincourt House, Monmouth, a seventeenth century half-timbered building in Wales
- Agincourt Square, an open space in the centre of Monmouth, Wales
- Azincourt, the town near which the Battle of Agincourt was fought
- Pengjia Islet located north of Taiwan island in Zhongzheng, Keelung, Taiwan; also known as Agincourt

== Books ==
- Agincourt, an 1844 book by George Payne Rainsford James
- Agincourt: Henry V and the Battle That Made England, a 2005 book by Juliet Barker
- Azincourt (novel), a 2008 book by Bernard Cornwell

== Other uses ==
- Agincourt (band), a 1960s English psychedelic folk band
- Agincourt (game), a 1979 board wargame
- "Agincourt Carol", an English folk song
- The Empress of Agincourt, an RSD-17 locomotive of the Canadian Pacific Railway
- HMS Agincourt, several ships of the Royal Navy
- Agincourt, several merchant ships
- Agincourt Hotel, in Black House novel by Stephen King and Peter Straub
- Project Agincourt, a US Department of Defense autonomous weapons program

== See also ==
- Agencourt, a commune in Côte-d'Or, France
- Azincourt, a commune in Pas-de-Calais, France
