= Brazilian battleship Rio de Janeiro =

Brazilian battleship Rio de Janeiro may refer to:

- A cancelled battleship of the Minas Geraes class contracted to Brazil.
- A battleship contracted to Brazil, but sold to the Ottoman Empire, while under construction, as Sultân Osmân-ı Evvel, becoming a prize of war with the outbreak of World War I, and serving as HMS Agincourt.

== See also ==
- Brazilian ironclad Rio de Janeiro
- Brazilian landing ship Rio de Janeiro (G31)
- Rio de Janeiro (ship)
- Rio de Janeiro (disambiguation)
