= SAPRIN =

SAPRIN is an acronym that may refer to:

== Possible Organizations ==
- Structural Adjustment Participatory Review International Network
- South African Population Research Infrastructure Network
