= Josiah Richard Perrett =

English naval architect

Josiah Richard Perrett (25 February 1848 – 26 October 1918) was an English engineer who was chief naval architect of Elswick Ordnance Company. His warship designs included the Brazilian Minas Geraes-class battleships and Rio de Janeiro (later HMS Agincourt), and the Chilean Almirante Latorre-class battleships.

He was born at Plymouth. He attended the Royal School of Naval Architecture and joined the admiralty. In 1887, he left the admiralty to join Elswick Ordnance Company as first assistant to Sir Philip Watts, whom he succeeded in 1902 as chief architect.

He died at Babbacombe, Torquay.
