= Rio de Janeiro (disambiguation) =

Rio de Janeiro is a city in Brazil.

Rio de Janeiro may also refer to:

- Rio de Janeiro (state), a state of Brazil
- Greater Rio de Janeiro, the metropolitan area of the city in Brazil
- A former name for Guanabara Bay
- Rio de Janeiro (Bahia), a river in the Brazilian state of Bahia
- Río de Janeiro (Buenos Aires Metro), a metro station in Buenos Aires
- Rio de Janeiro (ship)
- Protocol of Rio de Janeiro, a 1942 international agreement
- "Rio de Janeiro" (song), a song by Omer Adam

== See also ==
- Battle of Rio de Janeiro (disambiguation)
