= Sultan Osman I =

Sultan Osman I may refer to:

- Sultan Osman I (1258–1326), founder and namesake of the Ottoman Empire
- The battleship Sultan Osman I ordered by the Ottoman Empire but seized by the United Kingdom in 1914 and renamed HMS Agincourt
