= Minas Geraes-class battleship =

1910 Brazilian battleship class

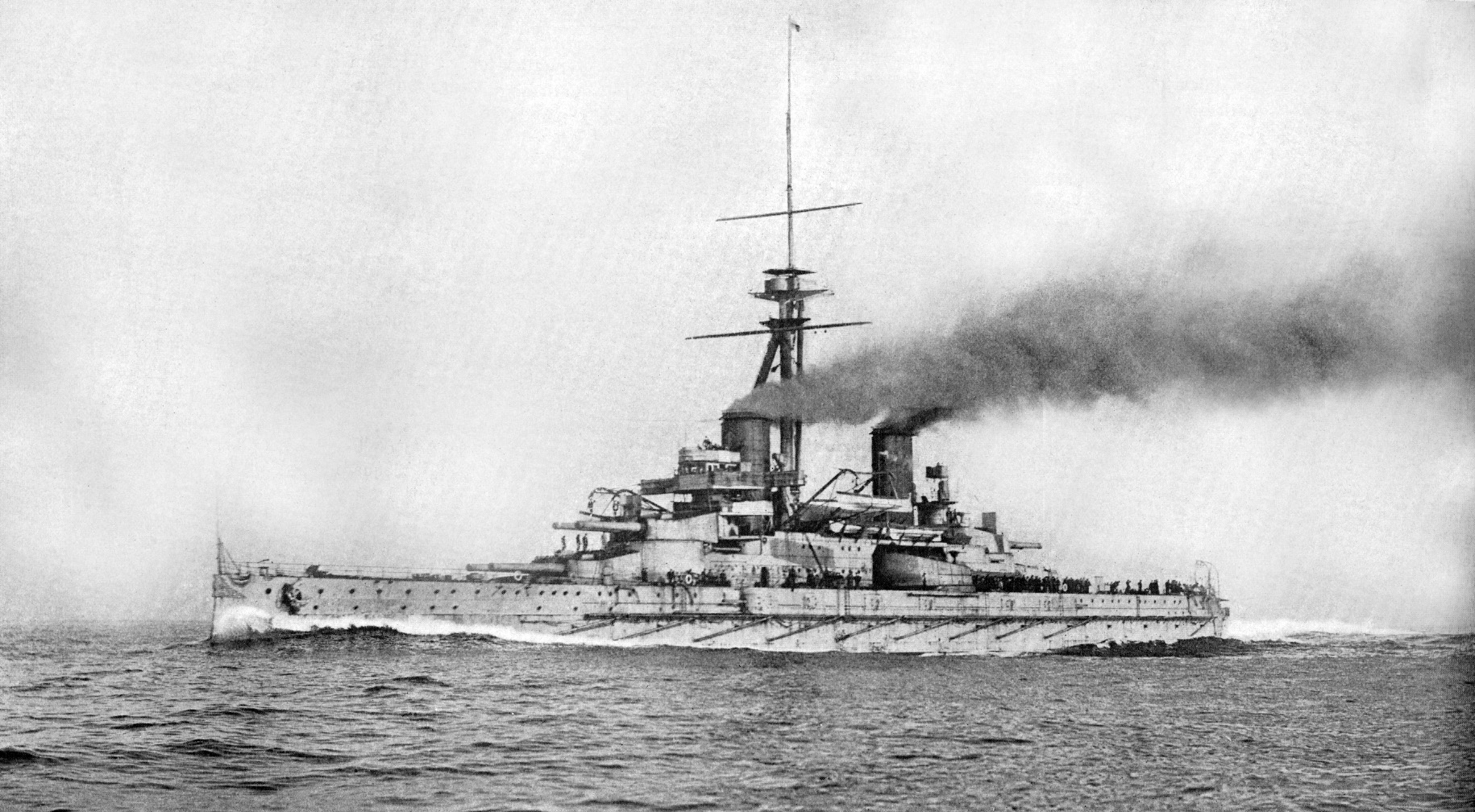
- Minas Geraes at speed during its sea trials

Class overview
- Name: Minas Geraes class
- Builders: Armstrong Whitworth, Newcastle upon Tyne; Vickers, Barrow-in-Furness
- Operators: Brazilian Navy
- Preceded by: Deodoro class
- Succeeded by: Rio de Janeiro (later HMS Agincourt); Riachuelo (planned)
- Cost: $8,863,842 (Note: This was a staggering sum of money for the time. After the ships were ordered, a Brazilian newspaper equated the initial purchase cost for Minas Geraes, São Paulo, and Rio de Janeiro (given as £6,110,100 without accounting for ammunition, which was £605,520, or necessary upgrades to docks, costing £832,000) as equaling 5,029 kilometres (3,125 mi) of railroad tracks or 30,300 homesteads. This large sum, however, was dwarfed by later costs for maintenance; the first five years of the ships' commissioned lives cost Brazil about 60% of the initial cost.)
- Built: 1907–1910
- In commission: 1910–1952
- Planned: 3
- Completed: 2
- Canceled: 1
- Retired: 2

General characteristics
- Displacement: 18,976 long tons (19,281 tonnes (t)) normal; 20,900 long tons (21,200 t) at full load
- Length: 543 ft (166 m) overall; 530 ft (160 m) at waterline
- Beam: 83 ft (25 m) mean
- Draft: 25 ft (7.6 m) mean; 28 ft (8.5 m) max
- Propulsion: 2-shaft Vickers vertical triple expansion; 18 Babcock & Wilcox boilers; 23,500 shp (17,500 kW)
- Speed: 21 knots (24 mph; 39 km/h)
- Range: 10,000 nmi (12,000 mi; 19,000 km) at 10 knots (12 mph; 19 km/h)
- Armament: 12 × 12 in (305 mm)/45 cal guns (6 × 2); 22 × 4.7 (120 mm)/50 cal guns; 18 × 3-pounder (47 mm) guns; 8 × 1 pdr (37 mm) guns
- Armor: Belt: 9 inches (230 mm); Belt extremities: 6–3 in (152–76 mm); Turrets: 12–9–2 to 3 in (305–229–51 to 76 mm; front–sides–top); Conning tower: 12 inches (300 mm)
- Notes: Specifications are as built

Two Minas Geraes-class battleships (Note: This name is spelled Minas Gerais (Portuguese pronunciation: [ˈminɐz ʒeˈɾajs]) in some sources. "Minas Geraes" was the spelling when the battleship was commissioned, but later changes to Portuguese orthography deprecated it in favor of "Minas Gerais". This article uses the original spelling.) were built for the Brazilian Navy in the early twentieth century. Named Minas Geraes and São Paulo, these "dreadnought" warships were intended to be Brazil's first step towards becoming an international power, and they consequently initiated a South American naval arms race.

In 1904, Brazil began a major naval building program that included three small battleships. Designing and ordering the ships took two years, but these plans were scrapped after the revolutionary dreadnought concept rendered the Brazilian design obsolete. Two dreadnoughts were instead ordered from the United Kingdom, making Brazil the third country to have ships of this type under construction, before traditional powers like Germany, France, or Russia. As such, the ships created much uncertainty among the major countries in the world, many of whom incorrectly speculated the ships were actually destined for a rival nation. Similarly, they also caused much consternation in Argentina and, consequently, Chile.

Soon after their delivery in 1910, both Minas Geraes and São Paulo were embroiled in the Revolt of the Lash (Revolta da Chibata), in which the Afro-Brazilian crews of four ships demanded the abolition of corporal punishment in the navy. The mutineers surrendered after four days, when a bill was passed granting amnesty to all those involved. In 1922, the two battleships were used to help put down a revolt at Fort Copacabana. Two years later, lieutenants on São Paulo mutinied but found little support from other military units, so they sailed to Montevideo, Uruguay, and obtained asylum. Minas Geraes was modernized in the 1930s, but both battleships were too old to participate actively in the Second World War, and instead were employed as harbor defense ships in Salvador and Recife. São Paulo was sold in 1951 to a British shipbreaker, but was lost in a storm north of the Azores while being towed to its final destination. Minas Geraes was sold to an Italian scrapper in 1953 and towed to Genoa the following year.

== Background ==
Brazil's navy fell into obsolescence after an 1889 revolution, which deposed Emperor Dom Pedro II, and an 1893 civil war. (Note: The civil war was begun by secessionists in the southern province of Rio Grande do Sul. In 1893, Rear Admiral Custódio José de Mello, the minister of the navy, revolted against President Floriano Peixoto, bringing nearly all of the Brazilian warships currently in the country with him. Mello's forces took Desterro when the governor surrendered, and began to coordinate with the secessionists, but loyal Brazilian forces overwhelmed them both. Most of the rebel naval forces were sailed to Argentina, where their crews surrendered; the flagship, Aquidabã, held out near Desterro until sunk by a torpedo boat.) Meanwhile, an Argentine–Chilean dispute over the boundary of Patagonia and control of the Beagle Channel kindled a naval arms race between the two beginning in the late 1880s and lasting until 1902. Restrictions were placed on the navies of both countries and major vessels under construction in both navies were sold as part of the British-mediated three pacts which ended the dispute, but both countries retained the numerous vessels built in the interim. As such, by the turn of the 20th century the Brazilian Navy lagged far behind the Chilean and Argentine navies in quality and total tonnage, (Note: Chile's naval tonnage was 36,896 long tons (37,488 t), Argentina's 34,425 long tons (34,977 t), and Brazil's 27,661 long tons (28,105 t).) despite Brazil having nearly three times the population of Argentina and almost five times the population of Chile.

Soaring demand for coffee and rubber brought Brazil an influx of revenue in the early 1900s. Simultaneously, there was a drive on the part of prominent Brazilians, most notably the Baron of Rio Branco, to have the country recognized as an international power. A large naval acquisition program was drawn up and passed by the National Congress of Brazil in October 1904 in accordance with their belief that a powerful navy would be crucial to the achievement of this goal, but it was two years before any ships were ordered.

Two factions argued over the types of ships to be ordered. One favored a navy centered on a small number of large warships, while the other preferred a larger navy of smaller warships. The latter originally prevailed with a bill authorizing the construction of three small battleships, three armored cruisers, six destroyers, twelve torpedo boats, three submarines, and two river monitors. Though the Brazilian government later eliminated the armored cruisers for monetary reasons, the Minister of the Navy, Admiral Júlio César de Noronha, signed a contract with Armstrong Whitworth for three battleships on 23 July 1906. While the first designs for these ships were derived from the Norwegian coastal defense ship Norge and the British (originally Chilean) Swiftsure class, (Note: Incidentally, the Swiftsure class, named Constitución and Libertad before being bought by the British, were the two Chilean warships sold as part of the 1902 Argentinian–Chilean pacts that ended their naval arms race.) the contracted ships were to follow Armstrong Whitworth's Design 439 (Design 188 in Vickers' files). They would displace 11,800 long tons (12,000 tonnes), have a speed of 19 knots (22 mph; 35 km/h), and be protected by belt armor of 9 inches (23 cm) and deck armor of 1.5 in (3.8 cm). Each ship would be armed with twelve 10-inch (25 cm) guns mounted in six twin turrets. These turrets would be mounted in a hexagonal configuration, similar to the later German Nassau-class battleships.

Alarmed, the American ambassador to Brazil sent a cablegram to his Department of State in September 1906, warning them of the destabilization that would occur if the situation devolved into a full naval arms race. At the same time, the American government under Theodore Roosevelt tried using diplomatic means to coerce the Brazilians into canceling their ships, but the attempts were dismissed, with the Baron of Rio Branco remarking that caving to the American demands would render Brazil as powerless as suzerain Cuba. The President of Brazil, Afonso Pena, supported the naval acquisitions in an address to the National Congress of Brazil in November 1906, as in his opinion the ships were necessary to replace the antiquated and obsolete vessels of the current navy.

== Bidding and construction ==
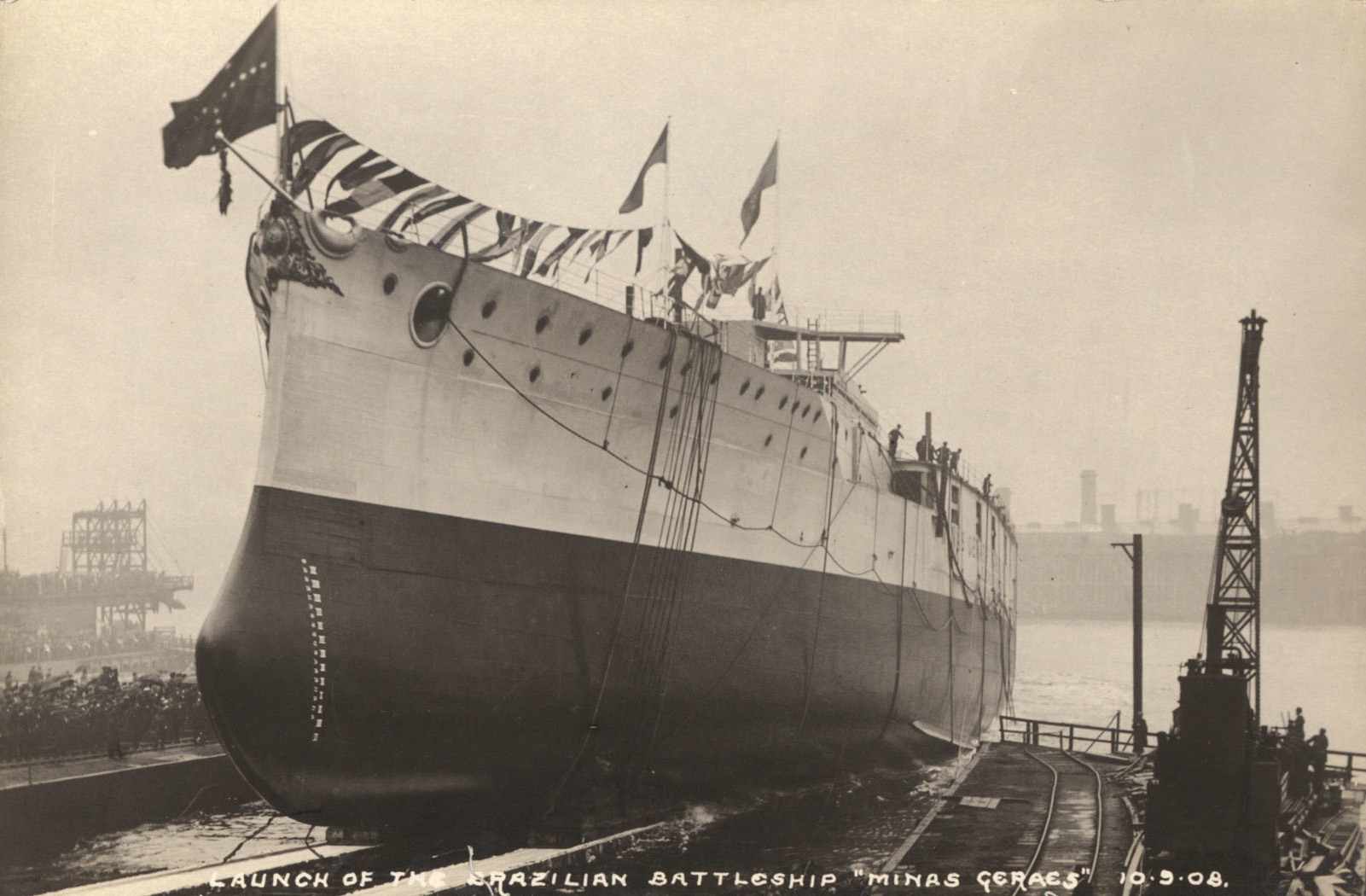

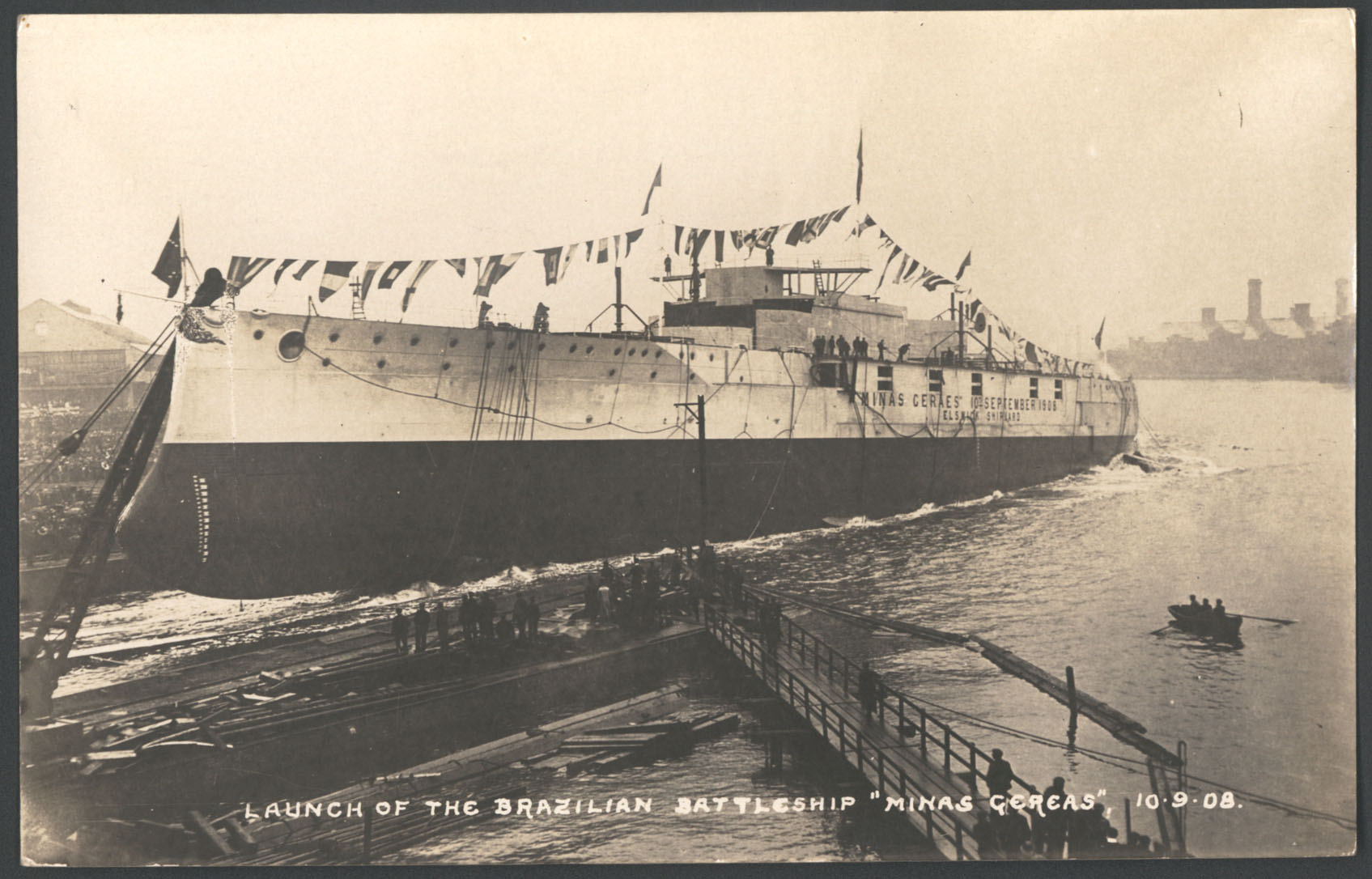
The launch of Minas Geraes on 10 September 1908. As the ship has not gone through its fitting-out period, it weighed only around 9,000 long tons (9,100 metric tons) at this time.

Design 439 was modified before these ships were laid down, increasing the displacement to 14,334 long tons (14,564 t) and making them slightly longer and wider. Two of these ships were laid down by Armstrong at Elswick in Newcastle upon Tyne (Minas Geraes and Rio de Janeiro), while the other was subcontracted out to Vickers in Barrow (São Paulo). However, the new dreadnought concept, which was showcased upon the completion of the namesake ship in December 1906, rendered the Brazilian ships obsolete. A transition to a few large warships was finalized with the selection of Rear Admiral Alexandrino Faria de Alencar for the powerful post of minister of the navy. The money authorized for naval expansion was redirected by de Alencar to building two dreadnoughts, with plans for a third dreadnought after the first was completed, two scout cruisers (which became the Bahia class), ten destroyers (the Pará class), and three submarines. The three battleships on which construction had just begun were demolished beginning on 7 January 1907.

An entirely new design incorporating the latest dreadnought technology was drawn up by J.R. Perrett, the head of Elswick Ordnance Company, and approved by the Brazilian government on 20 February 1907. Argentina and Chile immediately annulled the 1902 treaty that had ended their naval arms race, and both planned to expand their own navies, though Chile was delayed by a financial depression in 1907 and a major earthquake the next year.

Minas Geraes, the lead ship, was laid down by Armstrong on 17 April 1907, while its sister ship São Paulo followed thirteen days later at Vickers. Construction of the partial hull needed to launch Minas Geraes was delayed by a four-month strike to 10 September 1908, and São Paulo followed on 19 April 1909. Both were christened in front of large crowds by the wife of Francisco Régis de Oliveira, the Brazilian ambassador to the United Kingdom. After multiple trials of the speed, endurance, efficiency, and weaponry of the ship, Minas Geraes was completed and handed over to Brazil on 5 January 1910. São Paulo followed in July, after its own trials. The third dreadnought, which would have been named Rio de Janeiro and was provided for in the original contract, was laid down on 16 March, but as the ship had already been eclipsed by new naval technology (chiefly the advent of super-dreadnoughts, beginning with the British HMS Orion), the Brazilian government canceled it on 7 May and asked Armstrong to prepare a new design. (Note: Rio de Janeiro was eventually constructed as a much larger ship with fourteen 12-inch guns in seven turrets, all mounted on the centerline, but it was sold partway through construction to the Ottoman Empire. Later, shortly after the First World War broke out, the ship was taken over by the United Kingdom as HMS Agincourt.)

At this time, the dreadnought design had not been fully validated, despite the success of the British namesake; for example, there were still concerns that the Minas Geraes class' superfiring turret arrangement—which had not been utilized on the original Dreadnought, but was also being installed on the American South Carolina class—would cause blast to hurt the crew in the lower turret. Any immediate concerns, however, were mitigated during the firing tests when no ill effects were observed, though the Times (London) reported that there were still concerns registered during São Paulo's gun trials in June 1910.

== International reaction ==
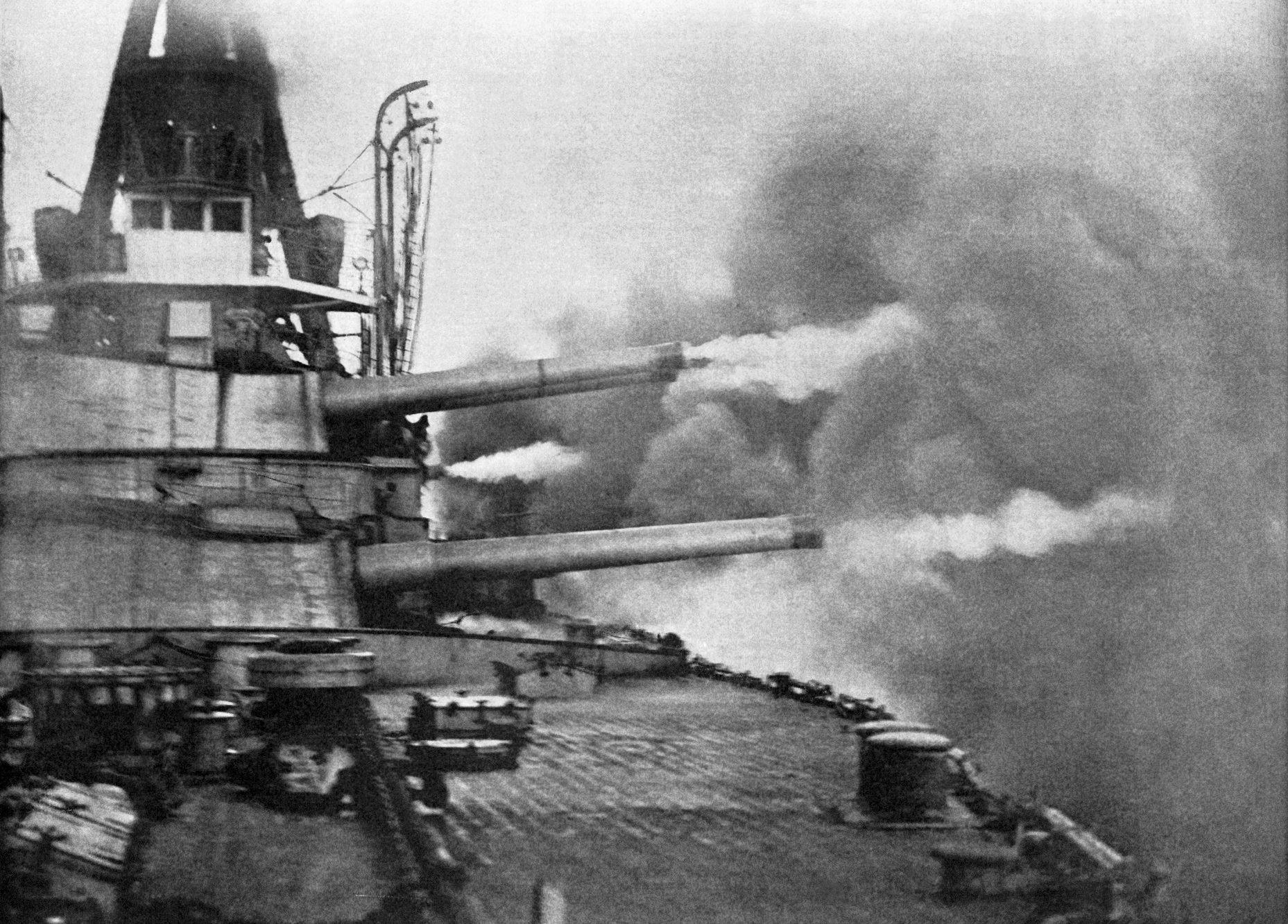
Minas Geraes conducting its gun trials, at that time the heaviest broadside ever fired off a ship

The start of work on Minas Geraes meant that Brazil had become the third country—behind the United Kingdom and the United States but ahead of major powers such as Germany, France, Russia and Japan—to have a dreadnought under construction. (Note: Although Germany laid down their first dreadnought, Nassau, two months after Minas Geraes, the German vessel was completed first (and in fact would be commissioned ahead not only of Minas Geraes, but also of the first U.S. dreadnought, Michigan, making Germany the fourth country to lay down a dreadnought, but the second to have one in service).)

The order for the dreadnoughts caused an immediate stir in the United States and Europe; in the words of the British Navy League Annual, they "astonished the naval world". The American New York Times opened an article on Minas Geraes' launch with "What on paper at least is the most powerful warship ever built for any navy ...", while Scientific American called Minas Geraes "the last word in heavy battleship design and the ... most powerfully armed warship afloat." Some publications, like the American Advocate of Peace, decried the dreadnought purchase for its cost, calling it "a showy and pretentious naval policy seemingly for the sheer indulgence of national pride" and continuing with "[sinking] money into useless warships when, it is understood, foreign money has had to be borrowed for city improvements in Rio de Janeiro is pitiful politics."

The British House of Commons debated purchasing the ships in March 1908 to bolster the Royal Navy while simultaneously ensuring they would not be sold to a foreign rival. The topic arose again in July and September, when Arthur Lee expressed his discomfort at the possible final dispositions of the Brazilian ships, as any sale had the potential to disrupt their "Two-Power Standard". International Marine Engineering analyzed the effect of a sale to Japan, stating that the total broadside weight of Japan's line of battle would be increased by 31.6%, and the only ships capable of matching the Minas Geraes' in the near future would be the American Delaware and German Nassau classes.

Newspapers and journals around the world speculated that Brazil was acting as a proxy for a naval power which would take possession of the two dreadnoughts soon after completion, as they did not believe that a previously insignificant geopolitical power would contract for such powerful armament. The evidence for a sale seemed strong, as Brazilian attempts to float a multi-million-dollar loan against the value of their coffee crop in 1908 were unsuccessful. With three dreadnoughts planned (including the upcoming Rio de Janeiro), a Spanish naval journal stated "it was only natural that rumors [would begin] to circulate supporting the argument that Brazil acted as an intermediary for some great power which would acquire them before they terminate their construction." Various British papers speculated that either the Germans, Japanese, or Americans were actually buying the ships, while naval experts in Germany thought the Americans, British, or Japanese were going to take them over. On the other side of the Atlantic, some American papers theorized that the ships would be sold to the United Kingdom, Germany, or Japan. The Brazilian government was forced to deny these spurious allegations several times. The New York Times remarked:

The rumor is that the three warships ... ordered [in Britain] two years ago will be launched from English shores only to fly the German flag. It is asserted that these ships, which are named the Sao Paulo, the Minas Geras [sic] and the Rio de Janeiro, and all of which will be completed by next fall, will be conveyed to the German government on the payment of $30,000,000.

It may be recalled that when orders were placed for the ships ... there was much speculation as to the destiny of the vessels, as no naval expert could understand how a second-rate power like Brazil needed such formidable engines of war which would represent absolutely the latest stages of naval construction and armament. Meanwhile, it had been reported that the ships were being built for the Japanese government, which had a secret understanding with Brazil. But this theory was soon discarded by the fact that relations between these two countries were not extremely cordial on account of the attitude of Brazil toward the immigration of Japanese laborers. (Note: cf. Japanese Brazilian. A series of rumors supporting this theory, where Brazil was alleged to have placed large armament orders in the United Kingdom on behalf of Japan (who would then use them against the United States), was strongly denied by the Brazilian government. Rio Branco, through a telegram sent to the Brazilian ambassador to the United States Joaquim Nabuco, based his counter-argument in the close relationship between Brazilian and American governments, saying "every sensible person will understand that an honest and respectable government would not lend itself to play the part attributed to Brazil by the inventor of the news.") Then it was semi-officially stated that the ships would never leave the ways except to fly the British flag, but the money for such a purpose could only be raised by a loan or the Admiralty getting the sum from the sinking fund—contingencies which would naturally become public property long before they could be carried out.

Despite the speculation, the United States quickly began courting Brazil as an ally; caught up in the spirit, US naval journals began using terms like "Pan Americanism" and "Hemispheric Cooperation".

In South America, the ships came as a rude shock and kindled a naval arms race among Brazil, Argentina, and Chile. The 1902 treaty between the latter two was canceled upon the Brazilian dreadnought order so both could be free to build their own dreadnoughts. Argentina in particular was alarmed at the possible power of the ships. The Minister of Foreign Affairs, Manuel Augusto Montes de Oca, remarked that either Minas Geraes or São Paulo could destroy the entire Argentine and Chilean fleets. While this may have been hyperbole, either one was much more powerful than any single vessel in the Argentinian fleet. As such, the Argentines quickly responded to the dreadnoughts with an order to the United States for two of their own, the Rivadavia class, while Chile ordered two of the Almirante Latorre class from the United Kingdom.

== Ships ==
Ship	Builder	Laid down	Launched	Completed	Fate
Minas Geraes	Armstrong Whitworth, Elswick	17 April 1907	10 September 1908	January 1910	Scrapped 1950s
São Paulo	Vickers	30 April 1907	19 April 1909	July 1910	Sank en route to scrapyard, September 1951
Rio de Janeiro	Armstrong Whitworth, Elswick	16 March 1910	–	–	Canceled 7 May 1910, then re-built to an entirely new design

== Service histories ==
After completion, both Minas Geraes and São Paulo sailed to other countries before arriving in Brazil. Minas Geraes left the Tyne on 5 February 1910 and traveled to Plymouth before beginning a voyage to the United States on 8 February. The ship was assigned to escort the American armored cruiser North Carolina, carrying the body of the former Brazilian ambassador to the United States Joaquim Nabuco, to Rio de Janeiro. They arrived in the city on 17 April 1910. São Paulo left Greenock on 16 September 1910, and stopped in Cherbourg, France, to embark the Brazilian President Hermes da Fonseca. Departing on the 27th, São Paulo voyaged to Lisbon, Portugal, where Fonseca was a guest of Portugal's King Manuel II. Soon after they arrived, the 5 October 1910 revolution began. Although the President offered political asylum to the King and his family, the offer was refused. There was a rumor that the King was on board and revolutionaries attempted to search the ship, but were denied permission. They also asked for Brazil to land marines "to help in the maintenance of order," but this request was also denied. São Paulo left Lisbon on 7 October for Rio de Janeiro, and docked there on 25 October.

=== Revolt of the Lash ===
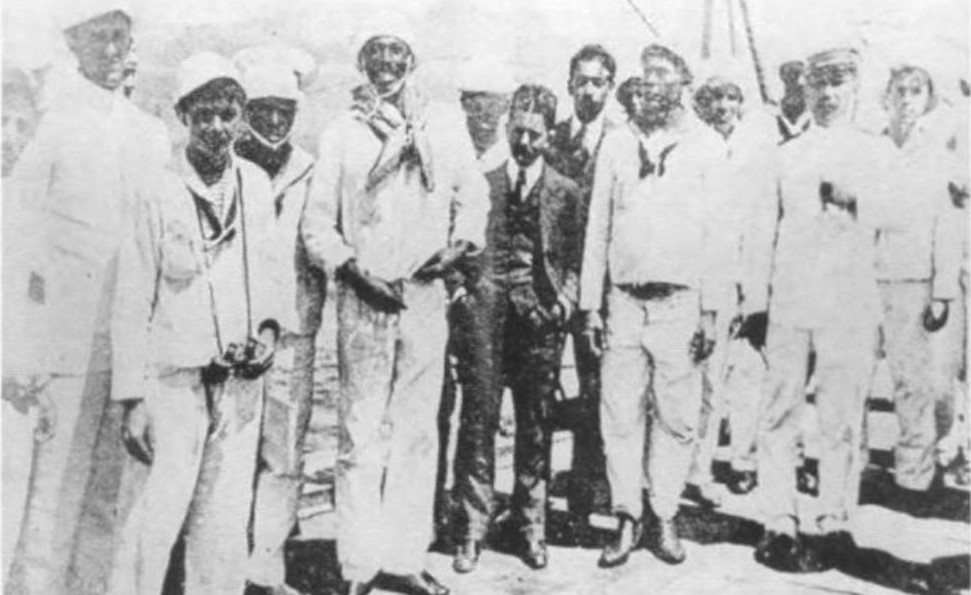
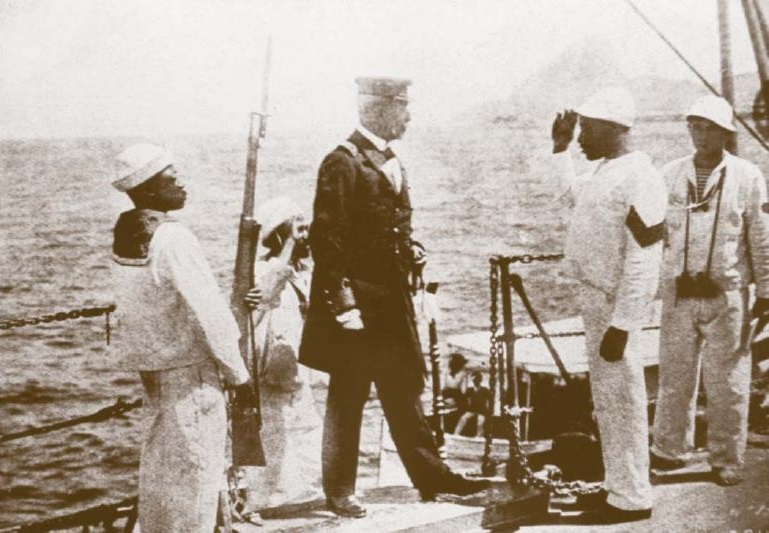
João Cândido with reporters, officers and sailors on board Minas Geraes on 26 November 1910, the final day of the revolt (left); João Cândido handing control of the ship back to the navy (right).

Soon after São Paulo's arrival, a major rebellion known as the Revolt of the Lash, or Revolta da Chibata, broke out on four of the newest ships in the Brazilian Navy. The initial spark was provided on 16 November 1910 when Afro-Brazilian sailor Marcelino Rodrigues Menezes was brutally flogged 250 times for insubordination. (Note: The sailor's back was later described by José Carlos de Carvalho, a retired navy captain assigned by the Brazilian government as their representative to the mutineers, as "a mullet sliced open for salting.") Many Afro-Brazilian sailors were sons of former slaves, or were former slaves freed under the Lei Áurea (abolition) but forced to enter the navy. They had been planning a revolt for some time, and Menezes became the catalyst. Further preparations were needed, so the rebellion was delayed until 22 November. The crewmen of Minas Geraes, São Paulo, the twelve-year-old Deodoro, and the new Bahia quickly took their vessels with only a minimum of bloodshed: two officers on Minas Geraes and one each on São Paulo and Bahia were killed.

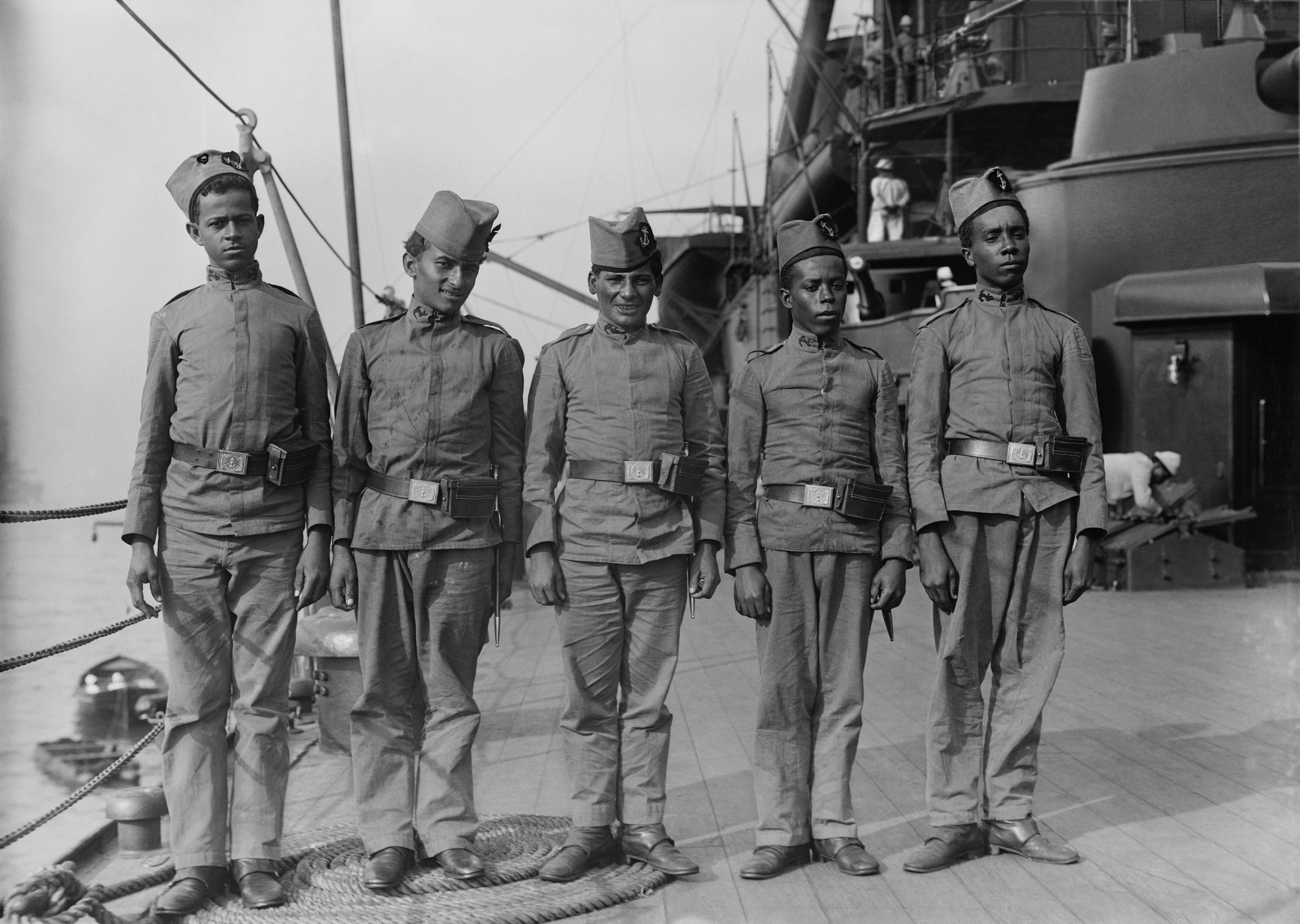
Sailors pose for a photographer on board Minas Geraes, probably during the ship's visit to the United States in early 1913.

The ships were well-supplied with foodstuffs, ammunition, and coal, and the only demand of mutineers—led by João Cândido—was the abolition of "slavery as practiced by the Brazilian Navy". They objected to low pay, long hours, inadequate training for incompetent sailors, and punishments including bôlo (being struck on the hand with a ferrule) and the use of whips or lashes (chibata), which eventually became a symbol of the revolt. By the 23rd, the National Congress had begun discussing the possibility of a general amnesty for the sailors. Senator Ruy Barbosa, long an opponent of slavery, lent a large amount of support, and the measure unanimously passed the Federal Senate on 24 November. The measure was then sent to the Chamber of Deputies.

Humiliated by the revolt, naval officers and the president of Brazil were staunchly opposed to amnesty, so they quickly began planning to assault the rebel ships. The former believed such an action was necessary to restore the service's honor. Late on the 24th, the President ordered the naval officers to attack the mutineers. Officers crewed some smaller warships and the cruiser Rio Grande do Sul, Bahia's sister ship with ten 4.7-inch guns. They planned to attack on the morning of the 25th, when the government expected the mutineers would return to Guanabara Bay. When they did not return and the amnesty measure neared passage in the Chamber of Deputies, the order was rescinded. After the bill passed 125–23 and the president signed it into law, the mutineers stood down on the 26th.

During the revolt, the ships were noted by many observers to be well-handled, despite a previous belief that the Brazilian Navy was incapable of effectively operating the ships even before being split by a rebellion. João Cândido ordered all liquor thrown overboard, and discipline on the ships was recognized as exemplary. The 4.7-inch guns were often used for shots over the city, but the 12-inch were not, which led to a suspicion among the naval officers that the rebels were incapable of using the weapons. Later research and interviews indicate that Minas Geraes' guns were fully operational, and while São Paulo's could not be turned after salt water contaminated the hydraulic system, British engineers still on board the ship after the voyage from the United Kingdom were working on the problem. Still, historians have never ascertained how well the mutineers could handle the ships.

=== Later career ===
Three years after the mutiny, Minas Geraes was used to transport Brazilian Minister of Foreign Affairs Lauro Müller to the United States. The ship returned on 16 July and arrived in Rio de Janeiro on 16 August. In September both Minas Geraes and São Paulo participated in a major exercise with most of the Brazilian Navy. The need for a more modern fire control system was identified as early as late 1913, but no action was taken. When Brazil entered the First World War in 1917, they were offered to the United Kingdom for service in the Grand Fleet, but the British declined due to the condition the ships were in. They had not been modernized since entering service, and maintenance had been neglected; to illustrate the problem, when Brazil sent São Paulo to the United States for a modernization in June 1918, fourteen of the eighteen boilers that powered the ship failed. The ship only finished the voyage to New York with the assistance of the American battleship Nebraska and cruiser Raleigh. Minas Geraes followed after its sister's return, and the modernization was done between 1 September 1920 and 1 October 1921.

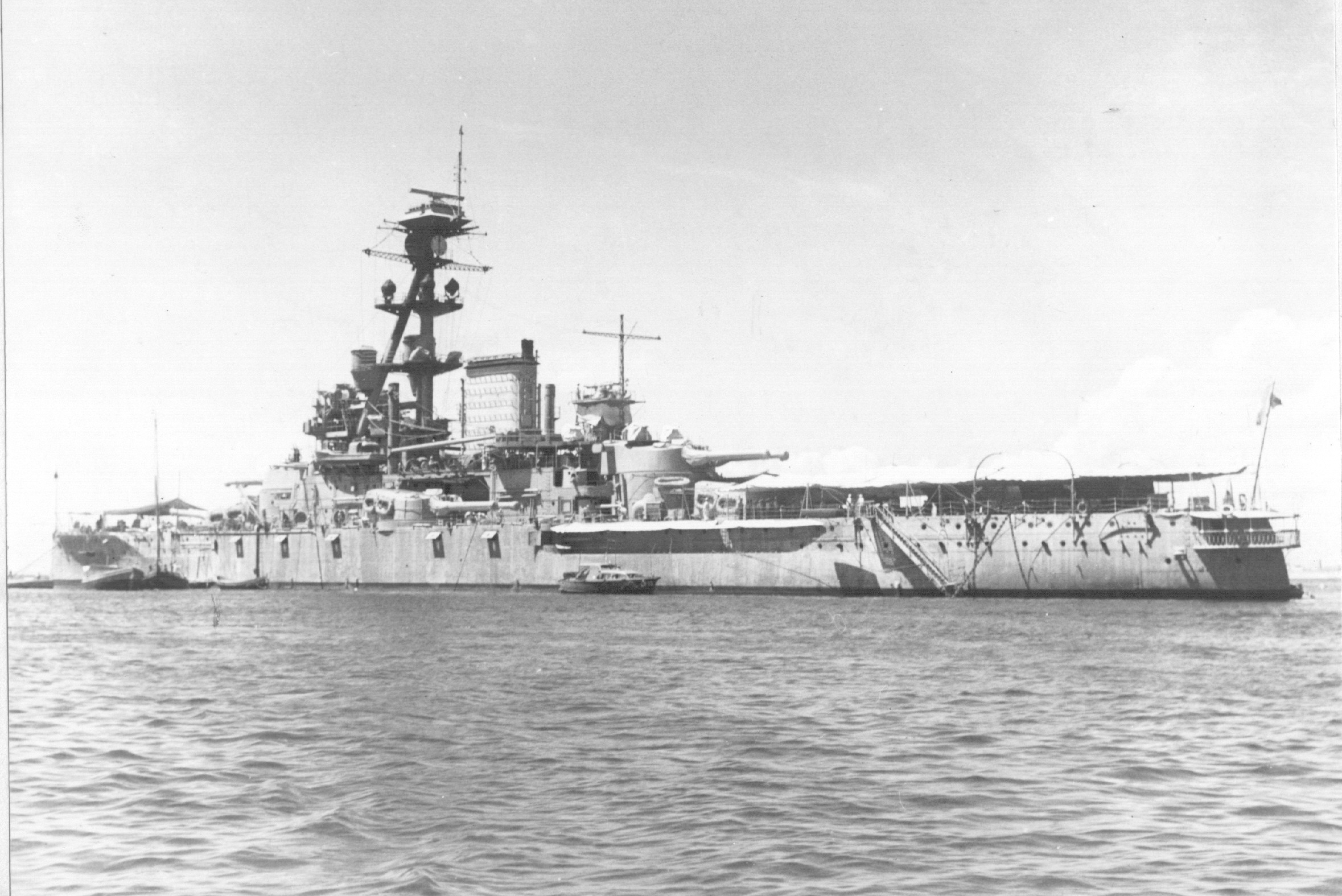
Minas Geraes after its 1930s modernization, possibly during the Second World War

São Paulo made two trips to Europe in 1920. The first conveyed King Albert I and Queen Elisabeth of Belgium to Brazil for the centennial celebrations. After São Paulo brought them home, the ship traveled to Portugal to take the bodies of the formerly-exiled Emperor Pedro II and his wife, Teresa Cristina, back to Brazil. (Note: cf. Legacy of Pedro II of Brazil.) In July 1922, both battleships helped to quash the first of the Tenente revolts (Revolução Tenentista), in which the garrison of Rio de Janeiro's Fort Copacabana rebelled and began bombarding the city. São Paulo shelled the fort, and the rebels surrendered shortly thereafter; Minas Geraes did not fire its guns. (Note: Scheina asserts that Minas Geraes shelled the fort, but this is contradicted by multiple other sources.) In 1924, three lieutenants, including Hercolino Cascardo, took over São Paulo with other crewmen. They were unsuccessful in swaying any other ships to their cause, except for an old torpedo boat, and soon sailed out of the harbor after firing a six-pounder gun at Minas Geraes. Short of food and with condensers in poor condition, the rebels sailed to Montevideo, where they received asylum. Minas Geraes followed São Paulo, arriving on 11 November and taking back possession of the ship.

Minas Geraes was modernized at the Rio de Janeiro Naval Yard from June 1931 to 1938, (Note: The 1938 date is somewhat variable; Topliss states "A ... modernization was undertaken in Brazil during the 1930s. The ship was placed in repair status on 10 June 1931 and ran sea trials only in 1938, on 22 April and 9 May. The ship returned to active service status on 10 June 1938, though all work was not completed until 1940.") while São Paulo led a naval force that blockaded Santos during the Constitutionalist Revolution of 1932. Though Brazil had also intended to modernize São Paulo, its poor condition—it was only able to make 10 knots (12 mph; 19 km/h) instead of its designed speed of 21 knots (24 mph; 39 km/h)—made such action uneconomical. Soon after Brazil's entrance into the Second World War on 21 August 1942, São Paulo was moved to Recife on 23 August to defend that port as a harbor defense ship; Minas Geraes played a similar role at Salvador. Even with the modernization, Minas Geraes was simply too old and vulnerable to actively participate in the war.

Both ships were decommissioned after the war, São Paulo on 2 August 1947 and Minas Geraes on 31 December 1952. The former was sold to a British shipbreaker and was towed out of Rio de Janeiro on 20 September 1951. When north of the Azores in a strong storm, the tow line snapped. Though multiple searches were mounted by American and British aircraft, the ship was never found. Minas Geraes was sold to an Italian company in 1953 and towed to Genoa from 11 March 1954 to 22 April.

== Specifications ==
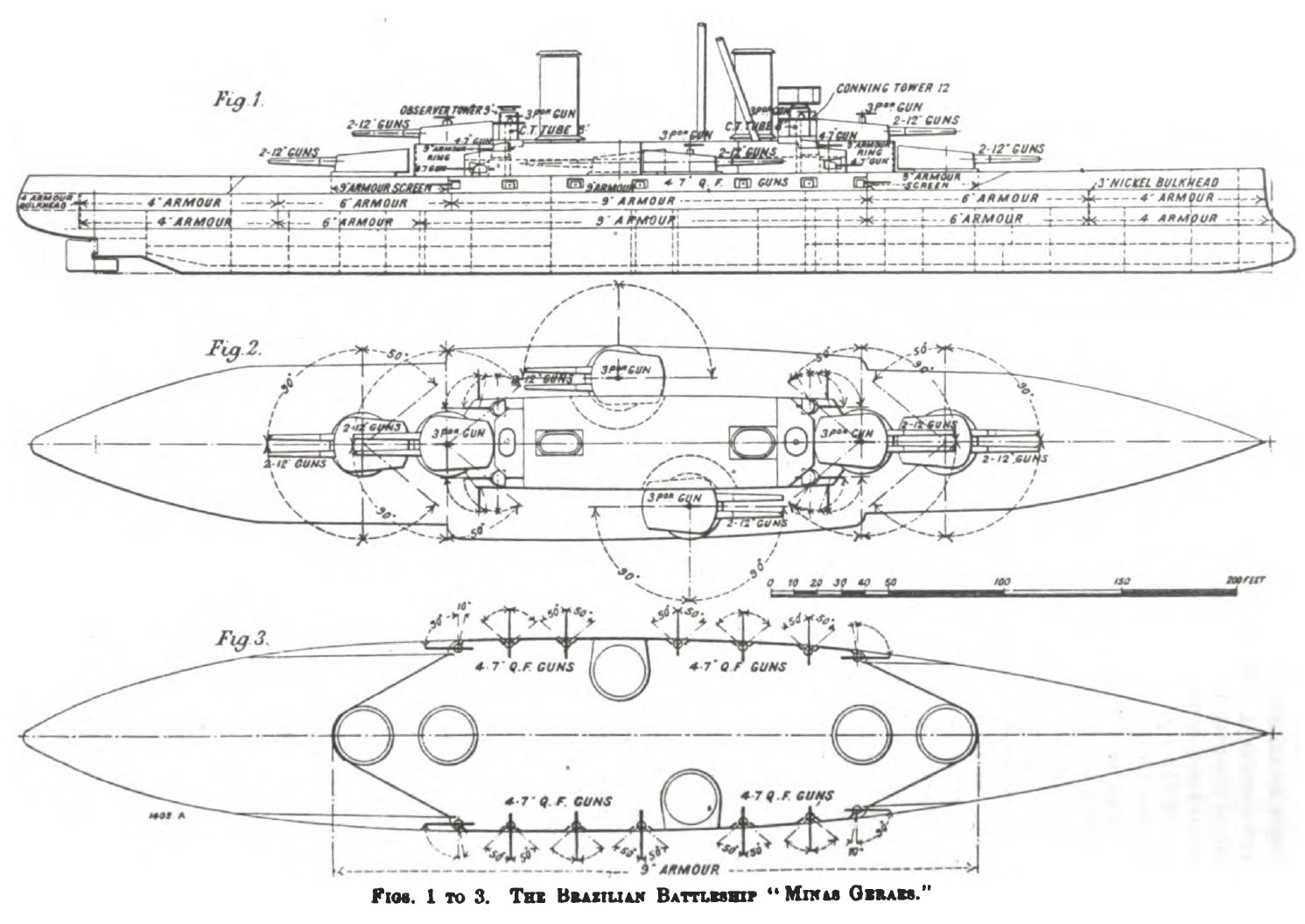
Plans of the Minas Geraes class, showing the armor values (fig. 1) and the theoretically possible radii of the main and secondary batteries (fig. 2 and 3), from the Journal of the United States Artillery (1910)

The two ships of the Minas Geraes class were 543 feet (166 m) overall, 530 feet (160 m) at the waterline, and 500 feet (150 m) between perpendiculars. They had a beam of 83 feet (25 m), a mean draft of 25 feet (7.6 m), a maximum draft of 28 feet (8.5 m), a normal displacement of 18,976 long tons (19,281 t), and a displacement of 20,900 long tons (21,200 t) at full load. At the beginning of their careers, the ships were crewed by about 900 men.

Minas Geraes and São Paulo were originally armed with twelve 12-inch/45 caliber, twenty-two 4.7-inch/50 caliber, eighteen 3-pounders and eight 1-pounder naval guns. The main battery was arranged with four superfiring turrets, two each fore and aft, and two placed en echelon. The 4.7-inch secondary guns were placed in casemates along the side of the ship.

The propulsion of the two ships was provided by Vickers vertical triple expansion engines instead of the steam turbines being used to power most contemporary dreadnoughts. Eighteen boilers provided power to the engines, which in turn rotated the two three-bladed propellers with 23,500 shaft horsepower. Their designed top speed was 21 knots (24 mph; 39 km/h), though this was frequently unattainable in their later careers owing to substandard maintenance and neglect. The ships could carry 2,350 tonnes (2,310 long tons) of coal and 400 tonnes (390 long tons) of oil, and their original endurance was 10,000 nautical miles (12,000 mi; 19,000 km) when traveling at 10 knots (12 mph; 19 km/h). During its trials, Minas Geraes was able to steam at 22.29 knots (25.65 mph; 41.28 km/h).

The main armor belt was Krupp cemented and nine inches (230 mm) thick, but narrowed to six and three inches (150 and 76 mm) closer to each end of the ships. The barbettes were protected by nine-inch armor, while the turret had a twelve-inch (300 mm) front, eight-inch (200 mm) sides, and a two- to three-inch (51 to 76 mm) top, and the conning tower had twelve-inch armor. The deck armor had multiple decks of one-and-a-half to two inches (38 to 51 mm), one inch (25 mm), and one inch.

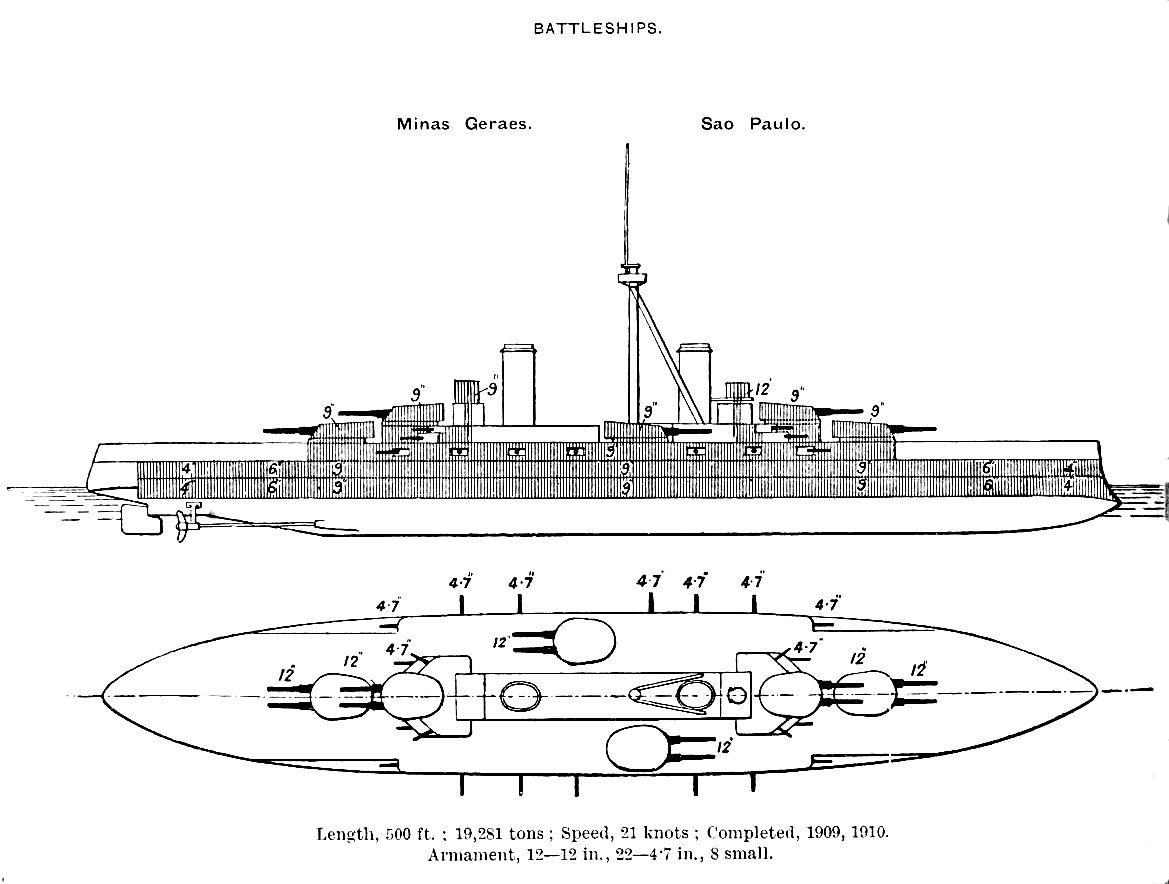
Plans of the Minas Geraes battleship, from The Naval Annual (1915)

== See also ==
- List of historical ships of the Brazilian Navy
