= South African Population Research Infrastructure Network =

Public health population monitoring system

South African Population Research Infrastructure Network (SAPRIN) is a demographic surveillance system (DSS) that is intended to gather and harmonize national health and demographic data. This network or partnership or platform offers stakeholders, public and academic institutions data, an interdisciplinary research platform, an evidence base and extended capacity. SAPRIN is intended to "integrate public, private and academic sectors in a long-term partnership, to produce first-rate, highly-relevant research." The organization was constituted in 2016 and is funded by the Department of Science and Innovation (DSI) and is hosted by the South African Medical Research Council (SAMRC).

== Rational for DSS ==
To measure the achievement of Sustainable Development Goals (SDGs), there is a critical need for timely and high quality data. SAPRIN, under Dr Kobus Hurst closely monitors data collected from 100,000 to 150,000 people in rural DSS sites in Limpopo, Mpumalanga and KwaZulu-Natal and attempts to understand the behaviour in these communities. Monitoring of poorer communities and collecting longitudinally can be used to improve the health of poorer South Africans in both rural and urban settings.

== Use Cases ==
Universities, science councils and other organizations can access this data on a distributed and national research platform. The platform acts a collaborative space, local scientists are fostered and nurtured, and prepares the next generation of researchers. SAPRIN also streamlines the research process, and reduces costs, which yields improved programme delivery and health outcomes. SAPRIN is part of the Department of Science and Innovation who are working to improve research capacity.

== Nodes ==
The network, partnership or platform consists of a Health and Demographic Surveillance System (HDSS) with six Nodes (three urban and three rural).

=== Rural nodes ===
1. Wits Rural, based in Agincourt, established in 1992 by Wits and the SAMRC in 1992 Bushbuckridge, Mpumalanga
2. AHRI (Africa Health Research Institute) established in 2000 and based in Somkhele and Durban
3. DIMAMO, established in 1996 by the University of Limpopo Population Health Research Centre. (PHRC) Located in the Eastern Region of Capricorn District, Limpopo.

=== Urban nodes ===
1. USINGA (Umlazi Surveillance Initiative to Nurture Grassroots Action)established in 2023, located in Umlazi.
2. GRT (Gauteng Research Triangle), founded in 2019 is an initiative taken by the VCs of UP, Wits and UJ to jointly create a trans-disciplinary research platform
3. C-SHARO (Cape Town Systematic Healthcare Action Research Project) jointly led by the Western Cape Government: Health and Wellness (WCGHW), the City of Cape Town, and five academic institutions

== Policymakers and researchers ==
Those researchers who are committed to supporting evidence-based research, improving the health and wellbeing of South African communities and contributing to healthy communities, use these platforms to build a responsive research infrastructure in South Africa.
