= HMS Agincourt =

Five ships of the Royal Navy have been called HMS Agincourt, named after the Battle of Agincourt of 1415, and construction of another was started but not completed.

- HMS Agincourt (1796) was a 64-gun third-rate ship of the line bought from the East India Company, where she had been named Earl Talbot, in 1796. She became a prison ship in 1812 and was renamed HMS Bristol. She was sold in 1814.
- HMS Agincourt (1817) was a 74-gun third rate launched in 1817. She was used for harbour service from 1848, was renamed HMS Vigo in 1865 and was sold in 1884.
- HMS Agincourt (1865) was a Minotaur-class ironclad frigate launched in 1865. She was renamed HMS Boscawen and used for harbour service from 1904, was renamed HMS Ganges II in 1906, became a coal hulk named C109 in 1908 and was broken up in 1960.
- HMS Agincourt was to have been a Queen Elizabeth-class battleship. She was ordered in 1914, but cancelled that year.
- HMS Agincourt (1913) was a battleship originally built for Brazil as Rio de Janeiro and launched in 1913. She was sold to Turkey as Sultan Osman, but the Royal Navy took her over before delivery on the outbreak of the First World War. She was present at the Battle of Jutland and was sold in 1922.
- HMS Agincourt (D86) was a Battle-class destroyer launched in 1945. She was converted to a radar picket in 1959 and scrapped in 1974.
- HMS Agincourt (S125) was the name chosen for an Astute-class submarine currently under construction (ordered in 2018) but was later renamed to HMS Achilles at the request of the King.
