= Rio de Janeiro (ship) =

Rio de Janeiro (ship) may refer to:

- Brazilian battleship Rio de Janeiro, two battleships
- MS Rio de Janeiro, the original name of the escort carrier HMS Dasher
- SS Rio de Janeiro (1914)
- Rio de Janeiro (2008 ship), container ship built in 2008
- Brazilian ironclad Rio de Janeiro
- Brazilian landing ship Rio de Janeiro (G31)
- MV Vale Rio de Janeiro
- SS City of Rio de Janeiro, passenger ship launched in 1878, sank in 1901
- Rio de Janeiro Maru (りおでじゃねろ丸 or りおで志゛やねろ丸), Imperial Japanese Navy submarine tender
