= Agincourt (ship) =

Several ships have been named Agincourt after the Battle of Agincourt of 1415.

- Agincourt (1804 ship) was a merchant vessel launched at North Shields. Her crew abandoned her in a leaking state in the Atlantic in December 1821.
- Agincourt (1819 ship) was launched at Ipswich. In 1822, she sailed to Bengal under a license from the British East India Company. She was last listed in 1828.
- Agincourt (1825 ship) merchant sailship was built at Monmouth. She was registered at Bristol in 1826. She was lost at Antigua on 29 January 1829 on her way to Nevis. Crew was saved but cargo lost.
- Agincourt (1841 ship), of 958 tons (bm), was launched at London. She traded with India and China and foundered on 24 June 1866 while sailing from Southampton to Hong Kong.
- Agincourt (1844 ship), of 543 tons (bm), was launched at Sunderland. In 1844 she sailed from Woolwich, England, and delivered convicts to Norfolk Island.
