= Battle of Rio de Janeiro (disambiguation) =

The Battle of Rio de Janeiro was a naval battle between France and Portugal that took place in September 1711 during the War of Spanish Succession.

Battle of Rio de Janeiro may also refer to:

- Battle of Rio de Janeiro (1558), 1558 battle between France and Portugal in Henriville (France Antarctique)
- Battle of Rio de Janeiro (1567), or the Battle of Guanabara Bay, 1567 battle between France and Portugal that ended the French colony France Antarctique in modern-day Rio de Janeiro
- Battle of Rio de Janeiro (1710), 1710 naval battle between France and Portugal that took place during the War of Spanish Succession.

== See also ==
- France–Portugal relations
