= Elswick Ordnance Company =

British armaments manufacturing company (1859–1927)

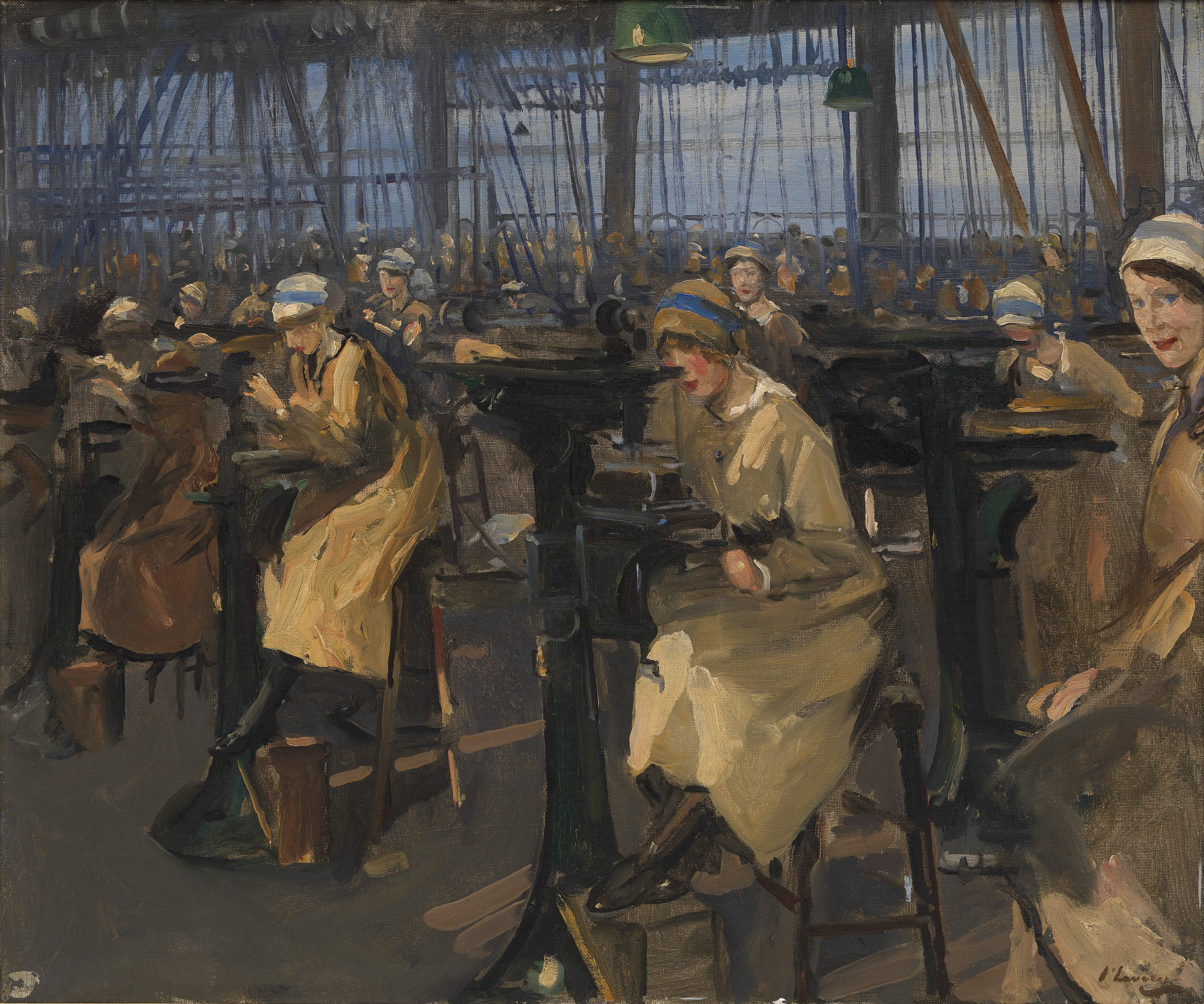
- Munition workers at Elswick in 1917 by John Lavery
- Type: Private
- Industry: Engineering
- Founded: 1859
- Defunct: 1927
- Fate: Merged into Vickers-Armstrongs
- Successor: W.G. Armstrong & Mitchell Company
- Headquarters: Newcastle upon Tyne, England
- Key people: William George Armstrong Founder
- Products: Artillery and ammunition

The Elswick Ordnance Company (sometimes referred to as Elswick Ordnance Works, but usually as "EOC") was a British armaments manufacturing company of the late 19th and early 20th century

== History ==
Elswick Ordnance Company was established in 1859 as a legal and organizational separation of William Armstrong's armaments activities from his other industrial interests. This arrangement was necessary to avoid a conflict of interest, as Armstrong was at the time serving as Engineer of Rifled Ordnance for the War Office, while the British Government was the company's principal customer.

Armstrong held no financial interest in the company during his period of government service. Following his departure from the War Office in 1864, Elswick Ordnance was reintegrated into the main Armstrong businesses, forming part of Sir W. G. Armstrong & Company. Thereafter, EOC functioned as the armaments division of W. G. Armstrong & Company, and later of Armstrong Whitworth.

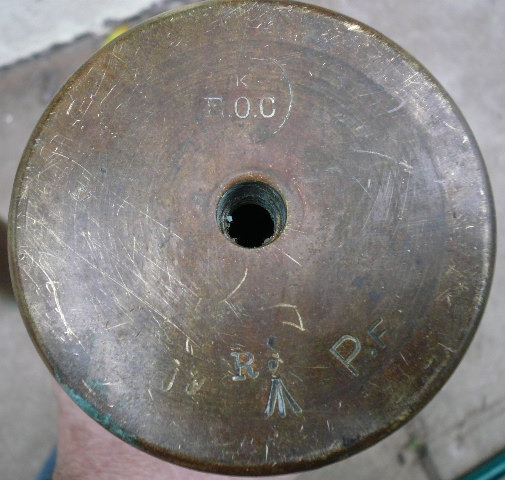
Cartridge case for QF 6-pounder gun from the 1890s, stamped EOC

In its early years, EOC's main customer was the British Government. However, in the mid-1860s the Government abandoned Armstrong guns due to dissatisfaction with Armstrong's breech mechanism, and instead produced its own rifled muzzle-loaders at Woolwich Arsenal, commonly known as Woolwich guns, a policy that lasted until 1880.

As a result, EOC relied largely on export orders for both muzzle-loading and breech-loading artillery throughout this period. Government procurement resumed in the 1880s, following the adoption of more reliable rifled breech-loaders incorporating robust interrupted screw breech mechanisms, notably the de Bange system and its successors.

Elswick Ordnance was a major arms developer before and during World War I. The ordnance and ammunition it manufactured for the British Government were stamped EOC, while guns made for export were usually marked W.G. Armstrong".

== See also ==
- J.R. Perrett

== Bibliography ==
- Johnston, Ian; Buxton, Ian (2013). The Battleship Builders – Constructing and Arming British Capital Ships. Annapolis, Maryland: Naval Institute Press. ISBN 978-1-59114-027-6.
