= Agincourt, Mpumalanga =

Agincourt
- Matsavana
- Location within Mpumalanga Location within South Africa
- Coordinates: 24.825°S 31.232°E
- Country: South Africa
- Province: Mpumalanga
- District: Ehlanzeni
- Municipality: Bushbuckridge

Area
  - Total: 8.50 km^{2} (3.28 sq mi)

Population (2011)
  - Total: 5,157
  - Density: 607/km^{2} (1,570/sq mi)

Racial makeup (2011)
  - Black African: 99.7%
  - Coloured: 0.2%
  - Other: 0.1%

First languages (2011)
  - Tsonga: 97.4%
  - Other: 2.6%
- Time zone: UTC+2 (SAST)
- PO box: 1368

Agincourt or Matsavana is a town in Bushbuckridge Local Municipality in the Mpumalanga province of South Africa.

Agincourt lies 100 km north of the border with Eswatini and 90 km east of the border with Mozambique.

To the west of Agincourt lies the Kruger National Park. The MRC/Wits Rural Public Health and Health Transitions Research Unit is based in Agincourt.

== Notable people ==
- Prince Mashele, author and political commentator
