= HMS Agincourt (1913) =

Dreadnought battleship launched in 1913

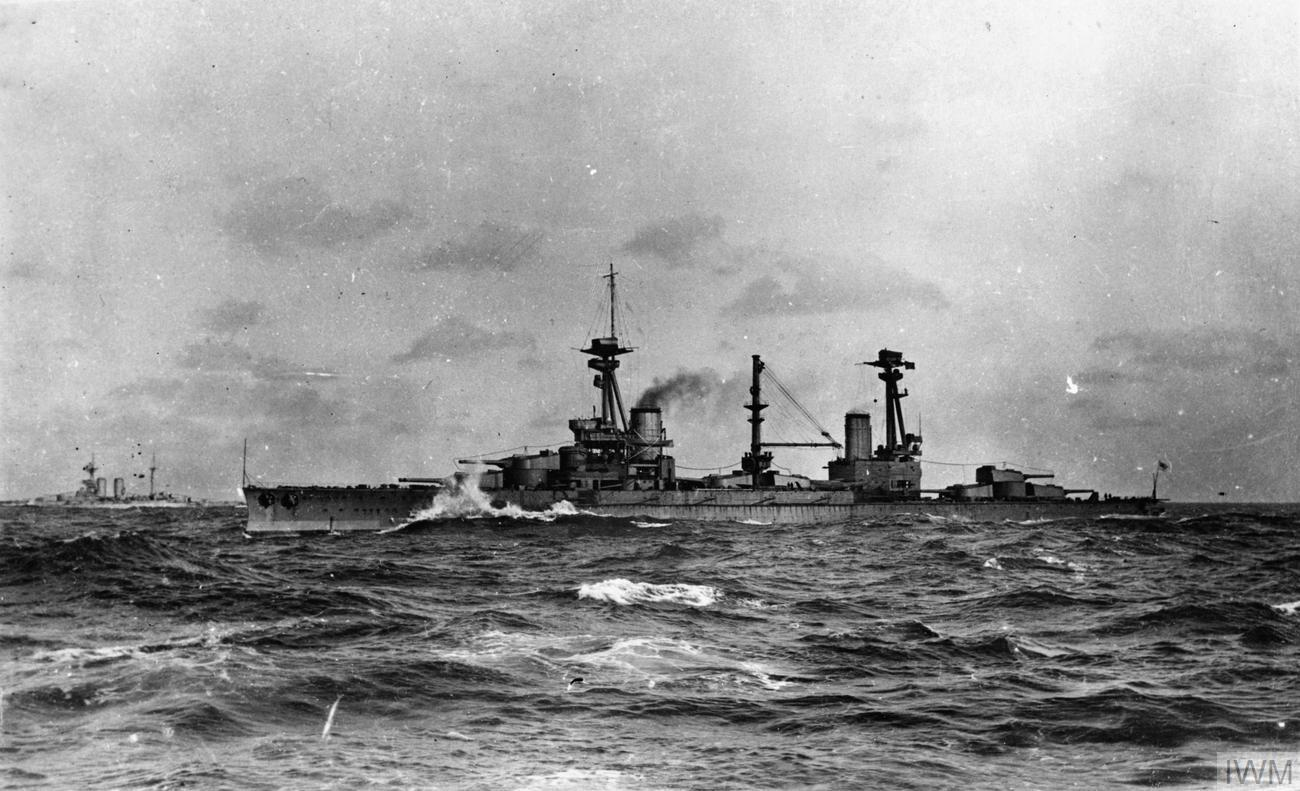
- Agincourt in 1915

History

Brazil
- Name: Rio de Janeiro
- Namesake: Rio de Janeiro
- Builder: Armstrong Whitworth, Elswick, Newcastle upon Tyne
- Cost: $14,500,000 (estimated)
- Yard number: 792
- Laid down: 14 September 1911
- Launched: 22 January 1913
- Fate: Sold December 1913 to the Ottoman Empire

Ottoman Empire
- Name: Sultan Osman-ı Evvel
- Namesake: Sultan Osman I
- Acquired: December 1913
- Fate: Seized in August 1914 by the United Kingdom

United Kingdom
- Name: Agincourt
- Namesake: Battle of Agincourt, 1415
- Completed: 20 August 1914
- Acquired: 3 August 1914
- Commissioned: 7 August 1914
- Decommissioned: April 1921
- Nickname(s): Gin Palace
- Fate: Sold for scrap, 19 December 1922

General characteristics (in British service)
- Type: Dreadnought battleship
- Displacement: 27,850 long tons (28,300 t) (load); 30,860 long tons (31,360 t) (deep load)
- Length: 671 ft 6 in (204.7 m)
- Beam: 89 ft (27.1 m)
- Draught: 29 ft 10 in (9.1 m)
- Installed power: 22 × water-tube boilers; 34,000 shp (25,000 kW)
- Propulsion: 4 × shafts; 4 × steam turbines
- Speed: 22 knots (41 km/h; 25 mph)
- Range: 7,000 nmi (13,000 km; 8,100 mi) at 10 knots (19 km/h; 12 mph)
- Complement: 1268 (1917)
- Armament: 7 × twin 12 in (305 mm) guns; 20 × single 6 in (152 mm) guns; 10 × single 3 in (76 mm) guns; 3 × 21 in (533 mm) torpedo tubes
- Armour: Belt: 9 in (229 mm); Deck: 1–2.5 in (25–64 mm); Barbettes: 2–9 in (51–229 mm); Turret: 8–12 in (203–305 mm); Conning tower: 12 in (305 mm); Bulkheads: 2.5–6 in (64–152 mm)

HMS Agincourt was a dreadnought battleship built in the United Kingdom in the early 1910s. Originally part of Brazil's role in a South American naval arms race, she holds the distinction of mounting more heavy guns (fourteen) and more turrets (seven) than any other dreadnought battleship, in keeping with the Brazilians' requirement for an especially impressive design.

Brazil ordered the ship in 1911 as Rio de Janeiro from the British company Armstrong Whitworth. However, the collapse of Brazil's rubber boom and a warming in relations with Argentina, the country's chief rival, led to the ship's sale while under construction to the Ottoman Empire. The Ottomans renamed her Sultan Osman I, after the empire's founder, and the ship was nearly complete when the First World War broke out. The British government seized her for use by the Royal Navy, together with another Ottoman dreadnought being constructed in Britain. This act caused resentment in the Ottoman Empire, as the payments for both ships were complete.

Renamed Agincourt by the Royal Navy, she joined the Grand Fleet in the North Sea. During the war, the ship spent the bulk of her time on patrols and exercises, although she did participate in the Battle of Jutland in 1916. Agincourt was put into reserve in 1919 and sold for scrap in 1922 to meet the terms of the Washington Naval Treaty.

== Background ==
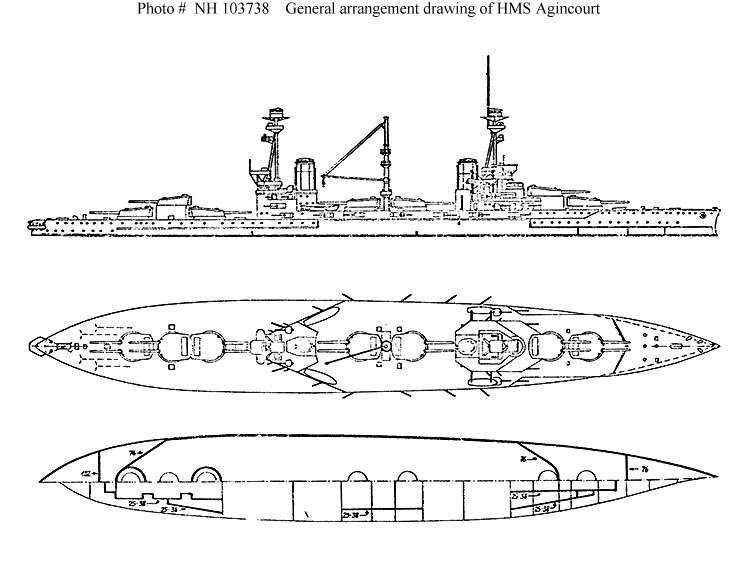
Starboard elevation and plan view of Agincourt

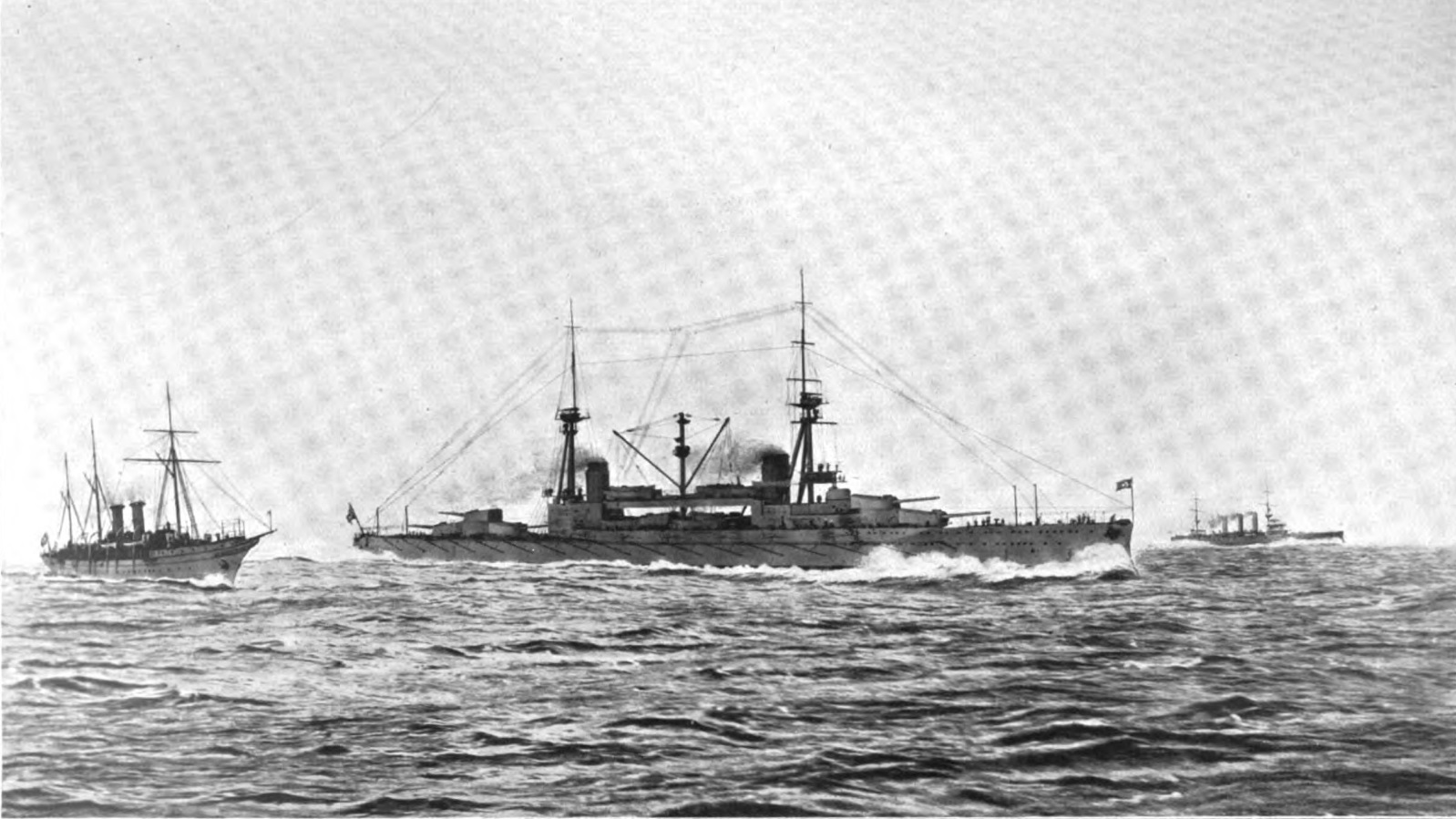
Fantasy drawing of Sultan Osman I underway for the Ottoman Navy. The royal yacht Ertuğrul is at left, and the cruiser Hamidiye is in the background.

In the unstable period during and following the 1889 coup in Brazil, which deposed Emperor Dom Pedro II, and the 1893–94 navy revolt, the Brazilian Navy found itself unable to care for its own ships, let alone acquire new vessels. Meanwhile, Chile had agreed to a naval-limiting pact in 1902 with Brazil's principal rival, Argentina, as part of solving a larger boundary dispute, but they both retained the vessels built in the interim, many of which were significantly more modern and powerful than Brazil's ships. (Note: The only modern armoured ships in the Brazilian Navy were two small coast-defence ships launched in 1898.) The Brazilian Navy was left behind its Argentine and Chilean counterparts in quantity as well—by the turn of the 20th century, Chile's total naval tonnage was 36,896 long tons (37,488 t), Argentina's 34,425 long tons (34,977 t), and Brazil's 27,661 long tons (28,105 t)—even though Brazil had nearly three times the population of Argentina and almost five times that of Chile.

Rising international demand for coffee and rubber in the early 20th century brought Brazil an influx of revenue. Simultaneously, the Baron of Rio Branco spearheaded a drive by prominent Brazilians to force the leading world nations to recognize Brazil as an international power. The National Congress of Brazil inaugurated a large naval acquisition program in late 1904. They ordered three small battleships in 1906, but the launch of Dreadnought caused the Brazilian Navy to reconsider their purchase. In March 1907, they signed a contract for three Minas Geraes-class battleships. Two ships would be constructed immediately by the British companies Armstrong Whitworth and Vickers, with the third to follow.

Alarmed at the Brazilian move, Argentina and Chile quickly nullified their 1902 pact and sought dreadnoughts of their own. Argentina's orders, after a drawn-out bidding process, went to an American company, Fore River Shipbuilding Company, while Chile's orders, delayed by the 1906 Valparaíso earthquake, went to Armstrong. Since Brazil's relations with Argentina were warming and the country's economic boom was losing steam, the government negotiated with Armstrong to remove the third dreadnought from the contract, but without success. They borrowed the necessary money, and Armstrong laid down Rio de Janeiro's keel in March 1910.

The Brazilian Navy had divided into two distinct factions, based on the size of the main battery. The outgoing naval minister favoured an increase over the 12-inch guns mounted on board the Minas Geraes class, while his incoming counterpart, Admiral Marques Leão, favoured keeping the smaller but faster-firing gun. While the exact influences upon the Brazilian government are unclear, Leão was advocating strongly for his position in meetings with President Hermes da Fonseca. Other events probably influenced them as well, such as the November 1910 Revolt of the Lash, payments on loans taken out for the dreadnoughts, and a worsening economy that had led to high government debt compounded by budget deficits. (Note: Brazil's external and internal debt would reach $500 and $335 million (respectively) by 1913, partly through rising deficits, which were $22 million in 1908 and $47 million by 1912.) By May 1911, Fonseca had made up his mind:

When I assumed office, I found that my predecessor had signed a contract for the building of the battleship Rio de Janeiro, a vessel of 32,000 tons, with an armament of 14 in. guns. Considerations of every kind pointed to the inconvenience of acquiring such a vessel and to the revision of the contract in the sense of reducing the tonnage. This was done, and we shall possess a powerful unit which will not be built on exaggerated lines such as have not as yet stood the time of experience.

A contract to build the ship that would become Agincourt was signed on 3 June 1911, and its keel was laid on 14 September 1911. The design called for fourteen 12-inch guns, an extreme number that historian David Topliss attributed to political necessity: the ship had to appear more powerful to the Brazilian populace than her predecessors (with twelve 12-inch guns) but, without increasing the gun size, the only option left was increasing the total number of guns.

== Design and description ==
=== General characteristics ===
Agincourt had an overall length of 671 feet 6 inches (204.7 m), a beam of 89 feet (27 m), and a draught of 29 feet 10 inches (9.1 m) at deep load. She displaced 27,850 long tons (28,297 t) at load and 30,860 long tons (31,355 t) at deep load. The ship had a metacentric height of 4.9 feet (1.5 m) at deep load. She had a large turning circle, but manoeuvred well despite her great length. She was considered to be a good gun platform.

When she came to serve in the Royal Navy, Agincourt was considered a particularly comfortable ship and very well-appointed internally. A knowledge of Portuguese was necessary to work many of the fittings—including those in the heads—as the original instruction plates had not all been replaced when she was taken over by the British. In 1917, her crew numbered 1,268 officers and men.

=== Propulsion ===
Agincourt had four Parsons direct-drive steam turbines, each of which drove one propeller shaft. The high-pressure ahead and astern turbines drove the wing shafts while the low-pressure ahead and astern turbines drove the inner shafts. The three-bladed propellers were 9 feet 6 inches (2.9 m) in diameter. The turbines were designed to produce a total of 34,000 shaft horsepower (25,000 kW), but achieved more than 40,000 shp (30,000 kW) during her sea trials, slightly exceeding her designed speed of 22 knots (41 km/h; 25 mph).

The steam plant consisted of twenty-two Babcock & Wilcox water-tube boilers with an operating pressure of 235 psi (1,620 kPa; 17 kgf/cm^{2}). Agincourt normally carried 1,500 long tons (1,500 t) of coal, but could carry a maximum of 3,200 long tons (3,300 t), as well as 620 long tons (630 t) of fuel oil to be sprayed on the coal to increase its burn rate. At full capacity, she could steam for 7,000 nautical miles (13,000 km; 8,100 mi) at a speed of 10 knots (19 km/h; 12 mph). Electrical power was provided by four steam-driven reciprocating electrical generators.

=== Armament ===
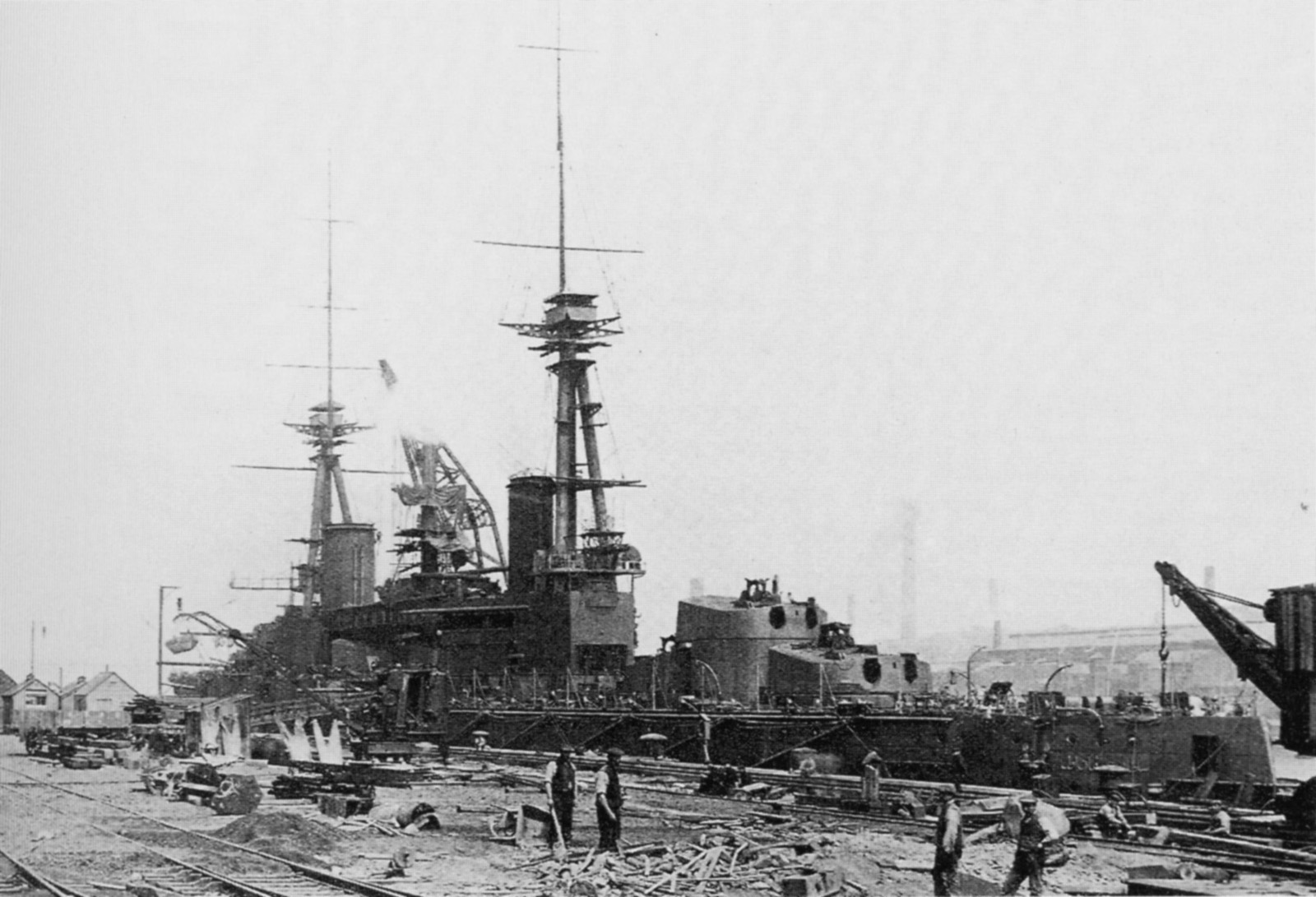
Sultan Osman-ı Evvel, soon to become Agincourt, in the fitting-out stage of her construction

Agincourt mounted fourteen BL 12-inch Mk XIII 45-calibre guns in seven twin hydraulically powered turrets, unofficially named after the days of the week, starting from Sunday, forward to aft. This was the largest number of turrets and heavy guns ever mounted on a dreadnought battleship. The guns could be depressed to −3° and elevated to 13.5°. They fired 850-pound (386 kg) projectiles at a muzzle velocity of 2,725 ft/s (831 m/s); at 13.5°, this provided a maximum range of just over 20,000 yards (18,000 m) with armour-piercing (AP) shells. During the war the turrets were modified to increase their maximum elevation to 16°, but this only extended the range to 20,435 yards (18,686 m). The rate of fire of these guns was 1.5 rounds per minute. When a full broadside was fired, "the resulting sheet of flame was big enough to create the impression that a battle cruiser had blown up; it was awe inspiring." No damage was done to the ship when firing full broadsides, despite the common idea that doing so would break the ship in half, but much of the ship's tableware and glassware did shatter when Agincourt fired her first broadside.

As built, Agincourt mounted eighteen BL 6-inch Mk XIII 50-calibre guns. Fourteen were placed in armoured casemates on the upper deck and two each in the fore and aft superstructures, protected by gun shields. After the ship was seized by the British, two more were added abreast the bridge in pivot mounts, protected by gun shields. The guns could be depressed to −7° and elevated to 13°, later increased to 15°. They had a range of 13,475 yards (12,322 m) at 15° when firing a 100-pound (45 kg) shell with a muzzle velocity of 2,770 ft/s (840 m/s). Their rate of fire was about five to seven rounds per minute, but this dropped to about three rounds per minute after the ready ammunition was used up because the ammunition hoists were too slow or few to keep the guns fully supplied. About 150 rounds were carried per gun.

Close-range defence against torpedo boats was provided by ten 3-inch (76 mm) 45-calibre quick-firing guns. These were mounted in the superstructure in pivot mounts and protected by gun shields. Agincourt also carried three 21-inch (533 mm) submerged torpedo tubes; one was on each beam and the last was in the stern. The water that entered the torpedo tubes when they were fired was discharged into the torpedo flat to facilitate reloading the tube and then pumped overboard. This meant that the torpedo crewmen would be operating in 3 feet (0.9 m) of water if rapid fire was required. Ten torpedoes were carried for them.

=== Fire control ===
Each turret was fitted with an armoured rangefinder in the turret roof. In addition, another one was mounted on top of the foretop. By the time of the Battle of Jutland in 1916, Agincourt was possibly the only dreadnought of the Grand Fleet not fitted with a Dreyer fire-control table. A fire-control director was later fitted below the foretop and one turret was modified to control the entire main armament later in the war. A director for the 6-inch (152 mm) guns was added on each side in 1916–17. A high-angle rangefinder was added in 1918 to the spotting top.

=== Armour ===
So much weight had been devoted to Agincourt's armament that little remained for her armour. Her waterline belt was just 9 inches (229 mm) thick, compared with twelve inches or more found in other British dreadnoughts. It ran some 365 feet (111.3 m), from the forward edge of "Monday" barbette to the middle of "Friday" barbette. Forward of this the belt thinned to six inches for about 50 feet (15.2 m) before further reducing to 4 inches (102 mm) all the way to the bow. Aft of the midships section the belt reduced to six inches for about 30 feet (9.1 m) and then thinned to four inches (102 mm); it did not reach the stern, but terminated at the rear bulkhead. The upper belt extended from the main to the upper deck and was six inches thick. It ran from "Monday" barbette to "Thursday" barbette. The armour bulkheads at each end of the ship angled inwards from the ends of the midships armoured belts to the end barbettes and were three inches thick. Four of Agincourt's decks were armoured with thicknesses varying from 1 to 2.5 inches (25 to 64 mm).

The armour of the barbettes constituted a major weakness in Agincourt's protection. They were 9 inches thick above the upper deck level, but decreased to 3 inches between the upper and main decks and had no armour at all below the main deck except for "Sunday" barbette (which had 3 inches), and "Thursday" and "Saturday" barbettes (which had 2 inches). The turret armour was 12 inches thick on the face, 8 inches (203 mm) on the side and 10 inches (254 mm) in the rear. The turret roofs were 3 inches thick at the front and 2 inches at the rear. The casemates for the secondary armament were protected by 6 inches of armour and were defended from raking fire by 6-inch-thick bulkheads.

The main conning tower was protected by 12 inches of armour on its sides and it had a 4-inch roof. The aft conning tower (sometimes called the torpedo control tower) had 9-inch sides and a 3-inch roof. The communications tube down from each position was 6 inches thick above the upper deck and 2 inches thick below it. Each magazine was protected by two armour plates on each side as torpedo bulkheads, the first one an inch thick and the second one and a half inches thick.

Agincourt had another weakness in that she was not subdivided to Royal Navy standards as the Brazilians preferred to eliminate all possible watertight bulkheads that might limit the size of the compartments and interfere with the crew's comfort. One example was the officer's wardroom, which was 85 by 60 feet (25.9 by 18.3 m) in size, much larger than anything else in the Grand Fleet.

=== Wartime modifications ===
Approximately 70 long tons (71 t) of high-tensile steel was added to the main deck after the Battle of Jutland to protect the magazines. Two 3-inch (76 mm) anti-aircraft guns were added to the quarterdeck in 1917–18. A 9-foot (2.7 m) rangefinder was added to the former searchlight platform on the foremast at the same time. A high-angle rangefinder was added to the spotting top in 1918.

== Construction and seizure ==
Agincourt depicted on a postcard, prior to the British modifications

Rio de Janeiro, as Agincourt was named by her first owners, was laid down on 14 September 1911 by Armstrong Whitworth at their Elswick Yard in Newcastle upon Tyne and launched on 22 January 1913. After the keel-laying, the Brazilian government found itself in an unenviable position: a European depression after the end of the Second Balkan War in August 1913 reduced Brazil's ability to obtain foreign loans, while at the same time Brazil's coffee and rubber exports collapsed, the latter due to the loss of the Brazilian rubber monopoly to British plantations in the Far East. (Note: The price of coffee declined by 20% and Brazilian exports of it dropped 12.5%^{(This figure is unduly precise)} between 1912 and 1913; rubber saw a similar decline of 25 and 36.6%,^{(This figure is unduly precise)} respectively.) In addition, reports on new dreadnought construction coming in from overseas indicated that the vessel would be outclassed upon completion. These factors caused Brazil to put the ship up for sale in October 1913, and she was sold to the Ottoman Navy for £2,750,000 on 28 December 1913. Renamed Sultân Osmân-ı Evvel, she underwent trials during the July Crisis the following year and was completed in August, just as the First World War was beginning.

The war broke out during her sea trials before delivery. Even though the Ottoman crew had arrived to collect her, the British Government took over the vessel for incorporation into the Royal Navy. The Turkish captain, waiting with five hundred Turkish sailors aboard a transport in the River Tyne, threatened to board his ship and hoist the Turkish flag; First Lord of the Admiralty Winston Churchill gave orders to resist such an attempt "by armed force if necessary." At the same time, the British also took over a second Ottoman battleship, a King George V class-derived vessel being built by Vickers—Reşadiye—which was renamed HMS Erin. Such an action was allowed in the contract only if Britain was at war at the time, but since Britain was not yet at war, these actions were illegal; the British government were nevertheless determined to present the Ottomans with a fait accompli. On 3 August, a day before Germany invaded Belgium, causing British political elites to reach a consensus on entering the war, the British ambassador to the Ottoman Empire informed the government that Britain had seized the ships. Churchill did not want to risk the ships being used against the British, but it had consequences.

The takeover caused considerable ill will in the Ottoman Empire, where public subscriptions had partially funded the ships. When the Ottoman government had been in a financial deadlock over the budget of the battleships, donations for the Ottoman Navy had come in from taverns, cafés, schools and markets, and large donations were rewarded with a "Navy Donation Medal". As a result, the seizure, and the gifts of the German battlecruiser Goeben and the cruiser Breslau to the Ottomans, influenced public opinion in the Empire to turn away from Britain. Although there is no evidence that the seizure played any part in the Ottoman government's October 1914 decision to declare war on Britain and the Triple Entente, the Ottomans did curiously offer to transfer Sultân Osmân-ı Evvel to the Germans at the beginning of August 1914. Historian David Fromkin has speculated that this offer was made in exchange for signing a secret defensive alliance, and that the Ottomans extended it only after learning that their battleship had been seized by the British.

The Royal Navy made modifications to Agincourt before commissioning her: in particular, it removed the flying boat deck over the two centre turrets. The ship was also initially fitted with Turkish-style lavatories that had to be replaced. Her name, "Agincourt", was a favourite of Churchill's, and had initially been allocated to a sixth vessel of the Queen Elizabeth class ordered under the 1914–15 Naval Estimates, but not yet begun at the war's outbreak. Her nickname, The Gin Palace, came from her luxurious fittings and a corruption of her name ("A Gin Court"), pink gin being a popular drink among Royal Navy officers at the time.

The Admiralty was unprepared to man a ship of Agincourt's size on such short notice and her crew was drawn "from the highest and lowest echelons of the service: the Royal yachts, and the detention barracks." Agincourt's captain and executive officer came from HMY Victoria and Albert, most of whose crew was also transferred to Agincourt on 3 August 1914. Most of the naval reservists had already been called up by this time and sent to other ships, so a number of minor criminals who had had their sentences remitted were received from various naval prisons and detention camps.

== Service ==
Agincourt was working up until 7 September 1914, when she joined the 4th Battle Squadron (BS) of the Grand Fleet. The fleet anchorage at Scapa Flow was not yet secure against submarine attack and much of the fleet was kept at sea, where Agincourt spent forty of her first eighty days with the Grand Fleet. This was the beginning of "a year and a half of inaction, only broken by occasional North Sea 'sweeps' intended to draw the enemy from his bases."

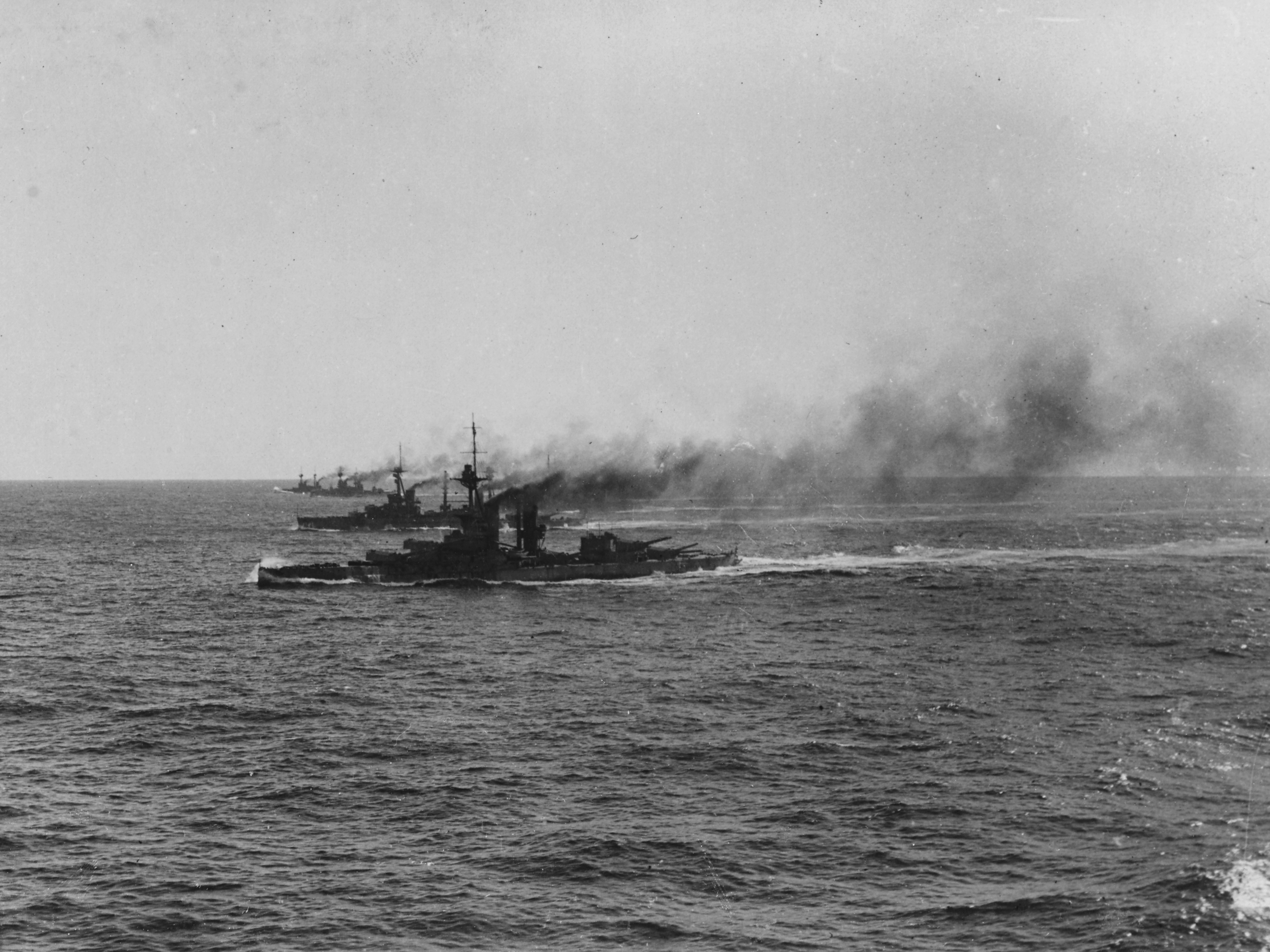
4th Battle Squadron in the North Sea in 1915. Agincourt is the second ship from the front.

On 1 January 1915, Agincourt was still assigned to the 4th BS, but had been assigned to the 1st Battle Squadron before the Battle of Jutland on 31 May 1916. She was the last ship of the Sixth Division of the 1st BS, along with Hercules, Revenge and the flagship, Marlborough, the most heterogeneous group possible as each ship was from a different class. The Sixth Division was the starboardmost column of the Grand Fleet as it headed south to rendezvous with the ships of Admiral Beatty's Battle Cruiser Fleet, then engaged with their opposite numbers from the German High Seas Fleet in the North Sea. Admiral Jellicoe, commander of the Grand Fleet, kept it in cruising formation until 18:15, (Note: The times used in this article are in GMT, one hour behind CET, which is often used in German works.) when he ordered it to deploy from column into a single line based on the port division, each ship turning 90° in succession. This turn made the Sixth Division the closest ships in the Grand Fleet to the battleships of the High Seas Fleet, and they fired on each ship as they made their turn to port. This concentration of fire later became known as "Windy Corner" to the British, as the ships were drenched by German shell splashes although none were hit.

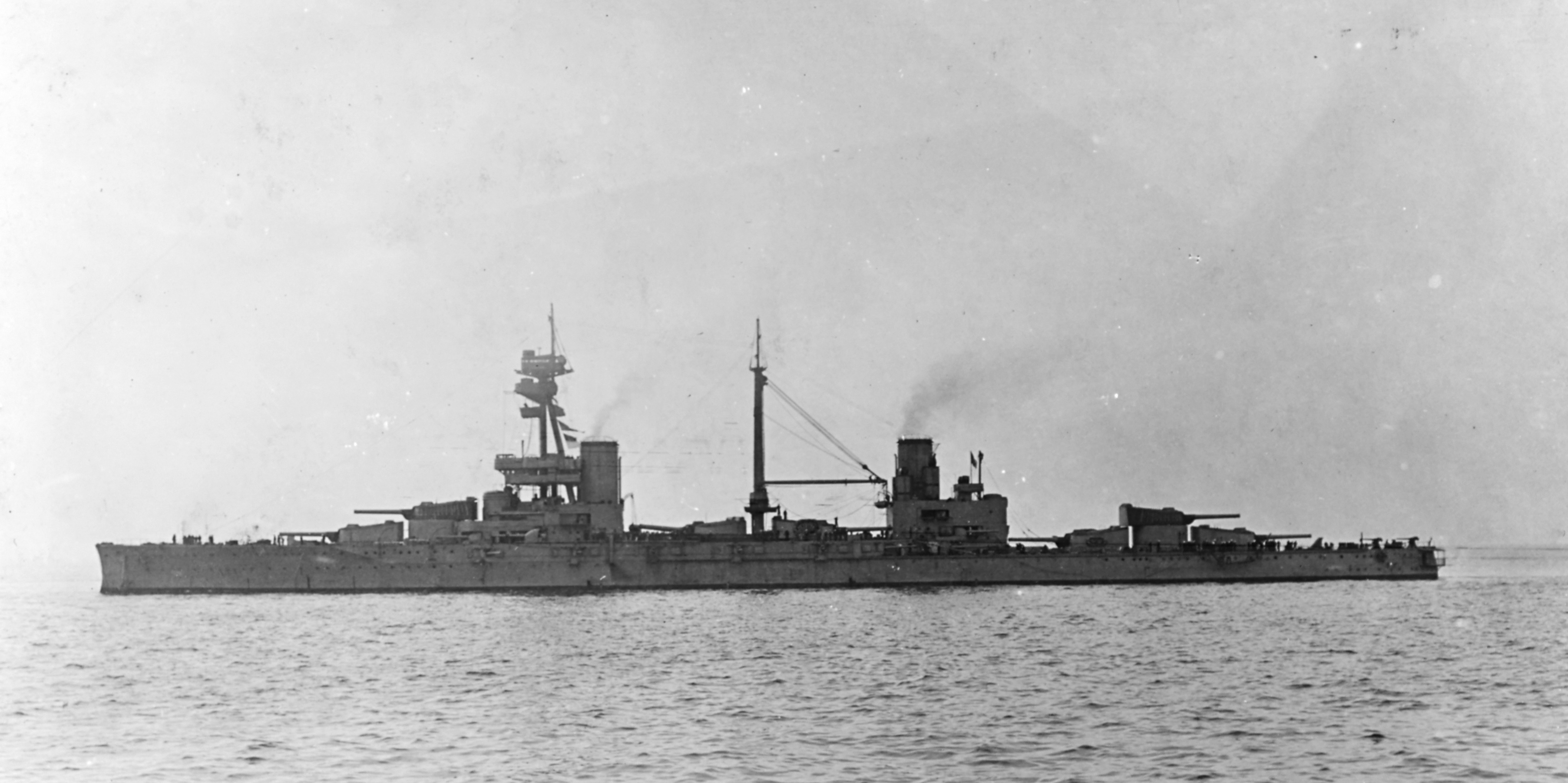
Agincourt in 1918

At 18:24, Agincourt opened fire on a German battlecruiser with her main guns. Shortly afterwards her six-inch guns followed suit as German destroyers made torpedo attacks on the British battleships to cover the turn to the south of the High Seas Fleet. Agincourt successfully evaded two torpedoes, although another struck Marlborough. Visibility cleared around 19:15, and she engaged a Kaiser-class battleship without result before it was lost in the smoke and haze. Around 20:00, Marlborough was forced to reduce speed because of the strain on her bulkheads from her torpedo damage and her division mates conformed to her speed. In the reduced visibility the division lost sight of the Grand Fleet during the night, passing the badly damaged battlecruiser SMS Seydlitz without opening fire. Dawn found them with only the detritus from the previous day's battle in sight and the division arrived back at Scapa Flow on 2 June. Agincourt fired 144 twelve-inch shells and 111 six-inch shells during the battle, although she is not known to have hit anything.

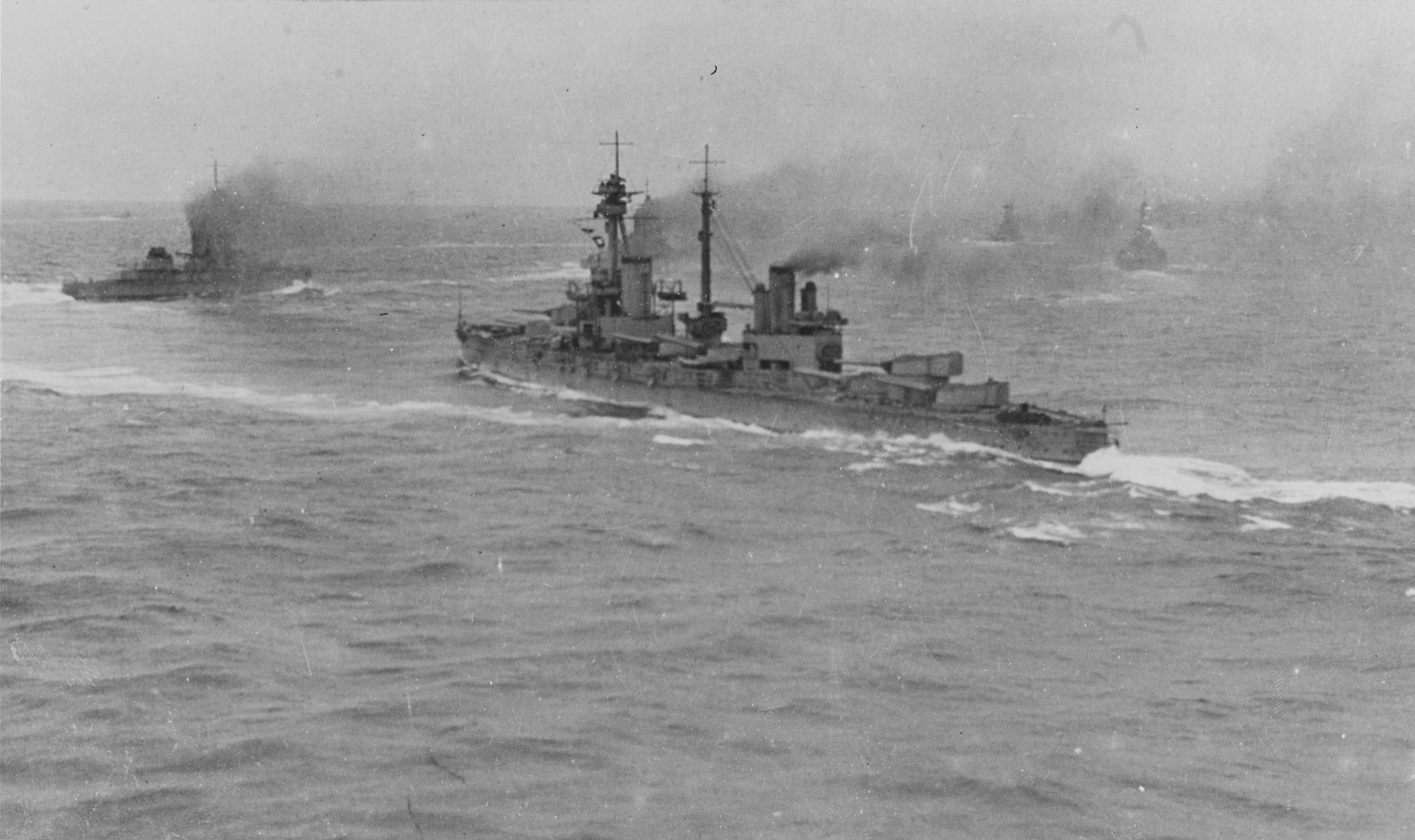
Both of the seized Ottoman ships in 1918: Agincourt (foreground) with Erin

Although the Grand Fleet made several sorties over the next few years it is not known if Agincourt participated in them. On 23 April 1918, Agincourt and Hercules were stationed at Scapa Flow to provide cover for the Scandinavian convoys between Norway and Britain when the High Seas Fleet sortied in an attempt to destroy the convoy. The reports from German Intelligence were slightly off schedule, as both the inbound and outbound convoys were in port when the Germans reached their normal route, so Admiral Scheer ordered the fleet to return to Germany without spotting any British ships.

Agincourt was later transferred to the 2nd Battle Squadron and was present at the surrender of the High Seas Fleet on 21 November 1918. She was placed in reserve at Rosyth in March 1919. After unsuccessful attempts to sell her to the Brazilian Government, she was listed for disposal in April 1921, but was used for experimental purposes later that year. The Royal Navy then planned to convert her into a mobile naval base and she was recommissioned on 21 November in preparation for the conversion, which would have included the removal of five of her seven turrets with their barbettes converted into storage and workshops; Nos. 2 and 5 turrets would have been retained. The conversion was cancelled on 23 February 1922 after the Washington Naval Treaty was signed that limited the battleship tonnage allowed to the RN and she was paid off on 7 April and listed again for disposal.

The ship was sold on 22 January 1923 to J&W Purves for £25,000 with the proviso that she had to be demolished 18 months after the treaty had been ratified. Her contract was immediately transferred to the Rosyth Shipbreaking Co. which had leased facilities at Rosyth Dockyard for that purpose. As the deadline of 17 January 1925 approached, the ship did not yet meet the treaty standards for scrapping. The Admiralty agreed that cutting the hull in half would be acceptable and the company attempted to move the ship through the dockyard locks on the highest Spring Tide to its beaching ground to complete the demolition. Bad weather thwarted that effort and the Admiralty agreed to allow the use of one of Rosyth's dry docks to meet the deadline. Two days later the hull had been severed and both halves had been floated out so they could be beached.

== Bibliography ==
- Burt, R. A. (1986). British Battleships of World War One. Annapolis, Maryland: Naval Institute Press. ISBN 0-87021-863-8.
- Dodson, Aidan (2021). "Warship Notes: The Mobile Naval Base". In Jordan, John (ed.). Warship 2021. Oxford, UK: Osprey Publishing. p. 196. ISBN 978-1-4728-4779-9.
- Dodson, Aidan (2022). "Warship Gallery: The Scrapping of HMS Agincourt, New Zealand, and Princess Royal at Rosyth, 1923–1925". In Jordan, John (ed.). Warship 2022. Oxford: Osprey Publishing. pp. 219–224. ISBN 978-1-4728-4781-2.
- Friedman, Norman (2008). Naval Firepower: Battleship Guns and Gunnery in the Dreadnought Era. Annapolis, Maryland: Naval Institute Press. ISBN 978-1-59114-555-4.
- Fromkin, David (1989). A Peace to End All Peace: The Fall of the Ottoman Empire and the Creation of the Modern Middle East. New York: H. Holt. ISBN 978-0-8050-0857-9.
- Gibbons, Tony (1983). The Complete Encyclopedia of Battleships: A Technical Directory of Capital Ships from 1860 to the Present Day. New York: Crescent Books. ISBN 0-517-37810-8.
- Grant, Jonathan (2007). Rulers, Guns, and Money: The Global Arms Trade in the Age of Imperialism. Cambridge, Massachusetts: Harvard University Press. ISBN 978-0-674-02442-7. OCLC 166262725.
- Harner, Robert (2006). "Question 18/02: British Naval Base at Addu Atoll". Warship International. XLIII (2): 152. ISSN 0043-0374.
- Hough, Richard (1967). The Great Dreadnought: The Strange Story of H.M.S. Agincourt: The Mightiest Battleship of World War I. New York: Harper & Row. OCLC 914101.
- Livermore, Seward (1944). "Battleship Diplomacy in South America: 1905–1925". Journal of Modern History. 16 (1): 31–48. doi:10.1086/236787. ISSN 0022-2801. JSTOR 1870986. OCLC 62219150. S2CID 145007468.
- Martin, Percy Allen (1967) [1925]. Latin America and the War. Gloucester, Massachusetts: Peter Smith. OCLC 468553769.
- Massie, Robert (2004). Castles of Steel: Britain, Germany and the Winning of the Great War. New York: Random House. ISBN 0-224-04092-8.
- Murfin, David (2020). "Warship Notes: The Mobile Naval Base". In Jordan, John (ed.). Warship 2020. Oxford, UK: Osprey. pp. 188–192. ISBN 978-1-4728-4071-4.
- Newbolt, Henry (1997). Naval Operations. History of the Great War: Based on Official Documents. Vol. V (reprint of the 1931 ed.). London: Imperial War Museum and Battery Press. ISBN 1-870423-72-0.
- Parkes, Oscar (1990) [1966]. British Battleships, Warrior 1860 to Vanguard 1950: A History of Design, Construction, and Armament (New & rev. ed.). Annapolis, Maryland: Naval Institute Press. ISBN 1-55750-075-4.
- Preston, Antony (1985). "Great Britain and Empire Forces". In Gardiner, Robert & Gray, Randal (eds.). Conway's All the World's Fighting Ships 1906–1921. Annapolis, Maryland: Naval Institute Press. pp. 1–104. ISBN 0-85177-245-5.
- Scheina, Robert (1987). Latin America: A Naval History, 1810–1987. Annapolis, Maryland: Naval Institute Press. ISBN 0-87021-295-8.
- Tarrant, V. E. (1999) [1995]. Jutland: The German Perspective: A New View of the Great Battle, 31 May 1916. London: Brockhampton Press. ISBN 1-86019-917-8.
- Topliss, David (1988). "The Brazilian Dreadnoughts, 1904–1914". Warship International. XXV (3): 240–289. ISSN 0043-0374.
- Vanterpool, Alan (1969). "The Riachuelo". Warship International. VI (2): 140–141. ISSN 0043-0374.
