= History of the Empire of Brazil =

The Empire of Brazil was established in 1822, when Prince Pedro declared Brazil's independence from Portugal and was acclaimed its first emperor. Portuguese resistance continued until 1824, and Portugal recognized Brazilian independence in 1825. Pedro I promulgated the Brazilian Constitution of 1824 after dissolving the constituent assembly. His reign was marked by political conflict and the Cisplatine War, and he abdicated in 1831 in favor of his young son, Pedro II.

During Pedro II's minority, Brazil was governed by a regency characterized by political instability, regional rebellions, and struggles over the balance of power between the central and provincial governments. Pedro II was declared of age in 1840, and the rebellions of the following years were suppressed. The subsequent period saw the consolidation of the Conservative and Liberal parties, greater political stability and economic growth, infrastructure development, and increasing international influence. Brazil also became involved in conflicts in the Río de la Plata basin, culminating in the Paraguayan War.

The Empire remained prosperous into the 1880s, but support for the monarchy weakened. Measures against slavery, including the Law of Free Birth of 1871 and the complete abolition of slavery by the Golden Law in 1888, contributed to political divisions, while Pedro II became increasingly disengaged from government and discontent grew within the military. Republican and Positivist influence among army officers increased, and on 15 November 1889 a military coup overthrew the monarchy and established a republic.

== Independence ==
The land now known as Brazil was claimed by the Portuguese for the first time on 23 April 1500 when the Navigator Pedro Álvares Cabral landed on its coast. Permanent settlement by the Portuguese followed in 1534, and for the next 300 years they slowly expanded into the territory to the west until they had established nearly all of the frontiers which constitute modern Brazil's borders. In 1808 the army of French Emperor Napoleon I invaded Portugal, forcing the Portuguese royal family into exile. They established themselves in the Brazilian city of Rio de Janeiro, which thus became the unofficial seat of the entire Portuguese Empire. On 12 December 1815 Dom João VI, then regent on behalf of his incapacitated mother, Queen Dona Maria I, elevated Brazil from colony to Kingdom united with Portugal.

Declaration of Brazil's independence by Prince Pedro on 7 September 1822. His Guard of Honor greets him in support while some discard blue and white armbands that represented loyalty to Portugal. Painting Independence or Death by Pedro Américo.

In 1820 the Constitutionalist Revolution erupted in Portugal. The movement, initiated by liberals, resulted in a meeting of the Cortes (English: Courts, a Constituent Assembly) which had as its goal to draft the kingdom's first constitution. The liberals demanded the return of João VI, who had been residing in Brazil since 1808 and who had succeeded his mother as King in 1816. He named his son and heir Prince Dom Pedro (later Pedro I of Brazil and Pedro IV of Portugal) as regent and departed for Europe on 26 April 1821. The Portuguese Cortes enacted decrees which subordinated the Brazilian provincial governments directly to Portugal, abolished all superior courts and administrative bodies created within Brazil since 1808 and recalled Prince Pedro to Portugal.

Two groups emerged, both of which feared that the Cortes was attempting to return Brazil to the status of a mere colony: the Luso-Brazilians (then called Constitutional Monarchists) and the Nativists (then called Federalists). Members of both were mainly Brazilian-born gentry, landowners, farmers and rich business men, with a minority who were immigrants from Portugal. The Luso-Brazilians were men who graduated in the University of Coimbra in Portugal before 1816 and were led by José Bonifácio de Andrada. They called for a constitutional and centralized monarchy to prevent the possibility of provincial secessionism. A few, such as Bonifácio, had further goals which included abolishing the slave trade and slavery itself, instituting land reform, and economic development of the country free of foreign loans. The Nativists, men without a higher education who had lived their entire lives in Brazil, desired exactly the opposite. They opposed the end of slavery, wanted a democracy in which only they were enfranchised, preservation of the existing social hierarchy, a monarch who would be a mere figurehead, and a weak federal organization in which the provinces would be ruled by the local interests without interference from the central government.

Both groups convinced the Prince not to return to Portugal, and he replied on 9 January 1822: "Since it is for the good of all and the general happiness of the Nation, I am willing. Tell the people that I am staying."" He appointed José Bonifácio, leader of the Luso-Brazilians, as head of the Cabinet on 18 January 1822. Pedro traveled to São Paulo province to secure its loyalty to the Brazilian cause, but he received a letter from Bonifácio as he was returning to Rio de Janeiro on 7 September. The prince learned that the Cortes had annulled the remaining powers he had retained. Pedro turned to his companions, who included his Guard of Honor and said: "Friends, the Portuguese Cortes wants to enslave and pursue us. From today onward our relations are broken. No ties unites us any longer". Pulling off his blue and white armband which symbolized Portugal, he continued: "Armbands off, soldiers. Hail to independence, to freedom and to the separation of Brazil". In a moment which would become the most iconic in Brazilian history, he unsheathed his sword and affirmed that "For my blood, my honor, my God, I swear to give Brazil freedom", and then cried out: "Independence or death!"

Pedro's decision to defy the Cortes was met with armed opposition across Brazil by troops loyal to Portugal. The ensuing Brazilian War of Independence spread throughout most of the country, with battles fought in the northern, northeastern, and southern regions. The last Portuguese soldiers surrendered on 8 March 1824, and independence was recognized by Portugal on 29 August 1825. In addition to those Brazilians and Portuguese who fought in the war, much of the credit for this victory is credited to Bonifácio's cabinet. It created an army and a navy practically out of nothing, greatly improved government finances, and unified the provinces under a single, cohesive leadership.

On 12 October 1822 Prince Pedro was acclaimed Dom Pedro I, Constitutional Emperor and Perpetual Defender of Brazil. It was concurrently the beginning of Pedro's reign and the birth of the independent Empire of Brazil. He was later crowned on 1 December. Meanwhile, Bonifácio initiated a judicial inquiry (which would become known as the "Bonifácia") against the Nativists, who were accused of conspiracy against the monarchy. Many were arrested.

== Early years ==
=== The Constituent Assembly ===
Before declaring independence, Pedro had called for holding Brazilian elections to select delegates to a Constituent and Legislative National Assembly. On 3 May 1823, the Constituent Assembly initiated work towards framing a political Constitution for the new nation. Its members, called national deputies, numbered 100 although only 88 actually sat on its sessions. They were indirectly elected by censitary suffrage and none belonged to political parties (these having yet to be formed). There were factions within it: the Luso-Brazilians, the Nativists, the Absolutists (then called Hunchbacks) and the Republicans. The latter were a few individuals with little influence or support. The remaining deputies were all monarchists. The Absolutists were mostly Portuguese who initially opposed Brazilian independence, although they accepted self-determination once it became inevitable. They opposed constitutional government and supported an absolutist form of monarchy. The Luso-Brazilians and Nativists supported a constitutional monarchy, with the former preferring a centralized government and the latter a loose federation.

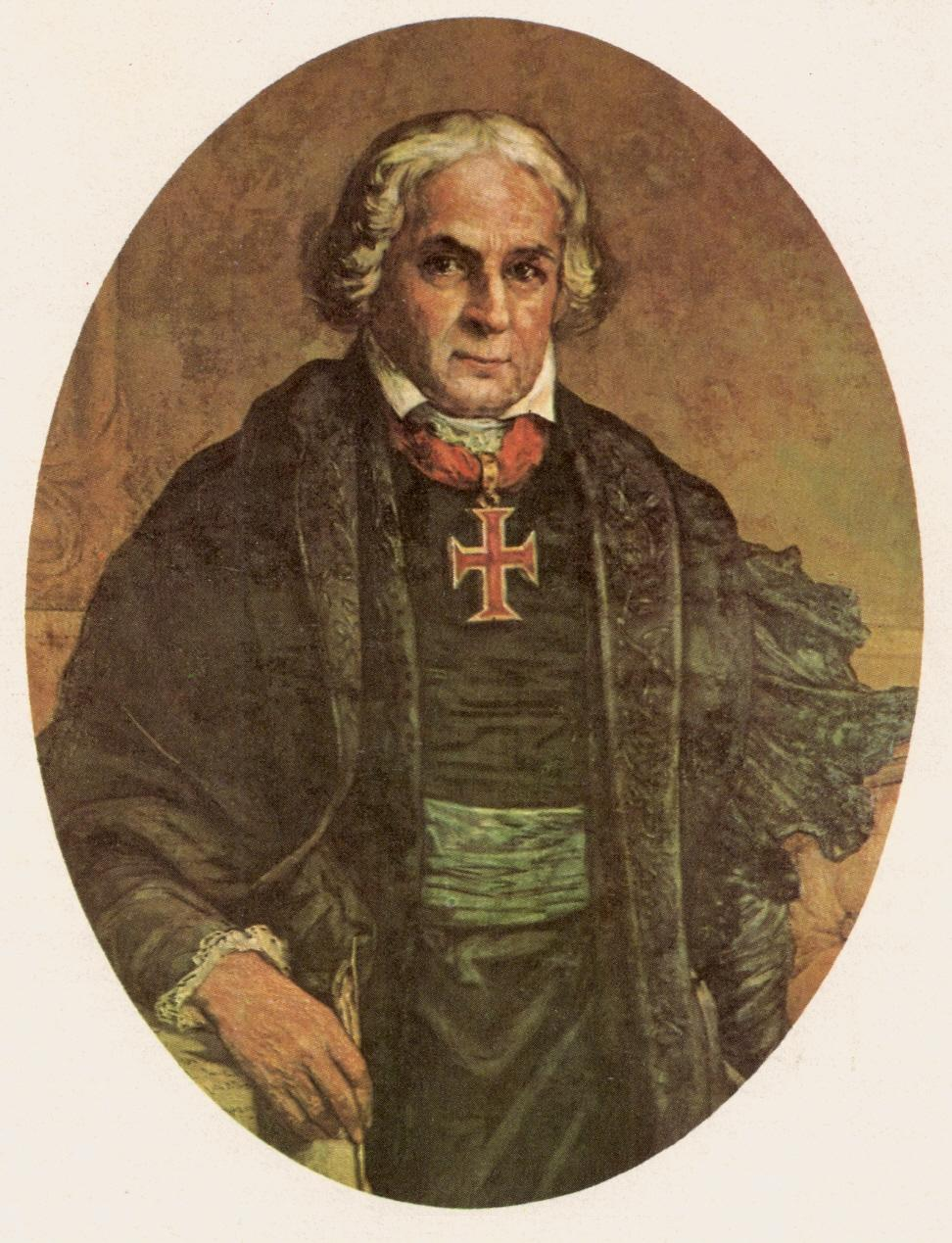
José Bonifácio de Andrada, hero of the Independence, leader of the Luso-Brazilians and later of the Restorationists.

The proposed Constitution was sent to the Assembly, where its members began working towards its promulgation. From the outset, the Nativists made attempts to overthrow the cabinet headed by Bonifácio at any cost. They wanted to avenge the persecution they had experienced during the "Bonifácia" in the previous year. The Absolutists, on the other hand, saw their interests threatened when Bonifácio issued two decrees which eliminated privileges reserved for those of Portuguese birth. Although holding many ideological differences, the Absolutists and the Nativists formed an alliance in order to remove their common enemy from power. Bonifácio himself had begun to lose support inside his own faction due to his arbitrary actions. A far more important factor which fueled the ever-increasing number of dissidents was reaction to the radical, if prescient, ideas he held—including the abolition of slavery. Eventually, disaffected members constituted a majority of the seats in the Assembly and signed a petition requesting the dismissal of Bonifácio's Cabinet. With the only alternative being to enter into an unnecessary conflict with the Assembly, Pedro I complied.

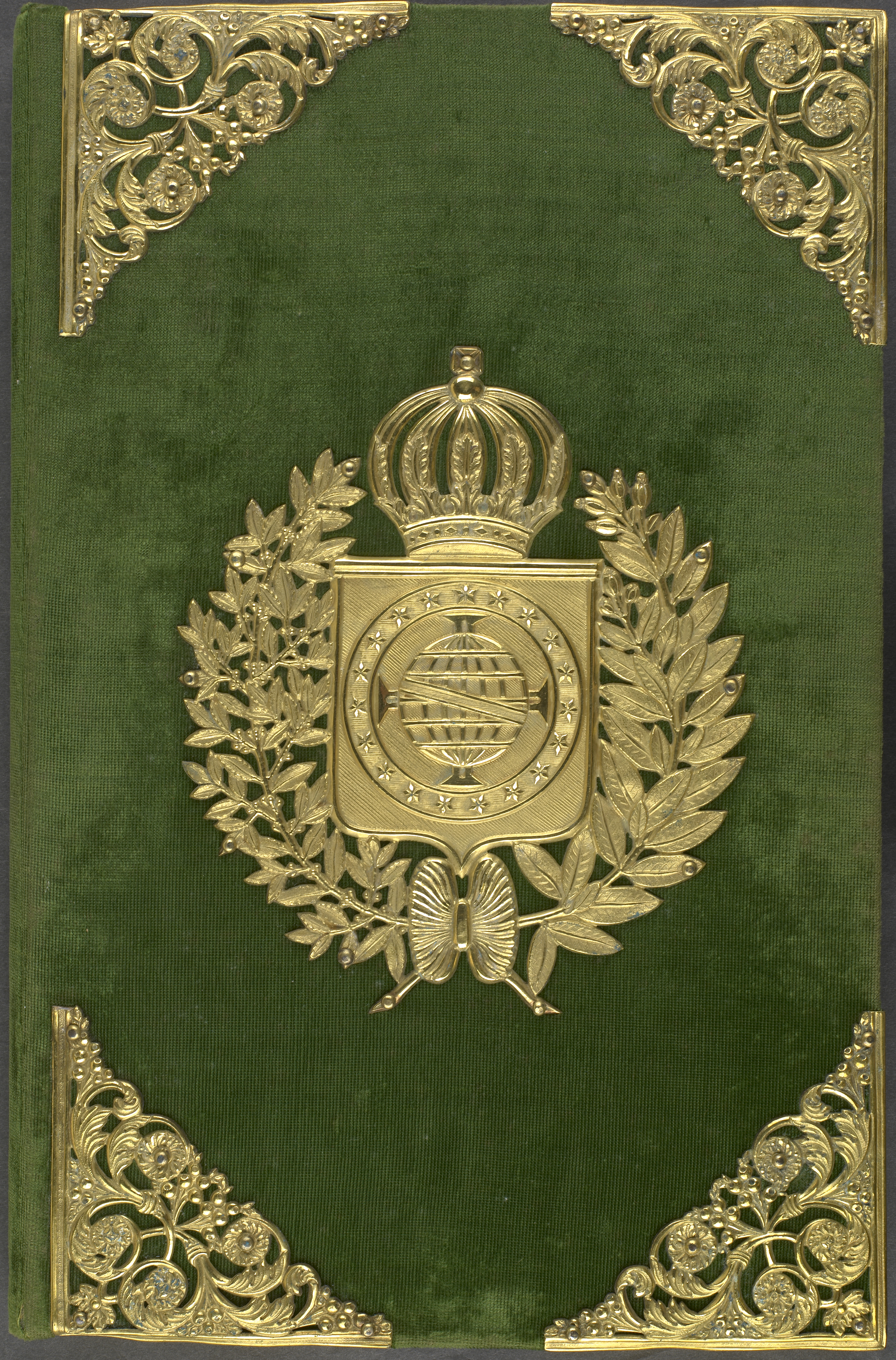
Brazilian Constitution, 1824.

The emperor appointed a member of the Nativists to head a new cabinet. Consequently, the Luso-Brazilians who had supported Bonifácio were recast as the opposition and created newspapers to attack adversaries in the Cabinet and the Assembly. Minor incidents continued to aggravate the internal struggle for power. The members of the Assembly paid little attention to completing work on the Constitution and instead concentrated on taking down their enemies. After several months, they had only approved 24 articles out of a total of 272.

The Emperor signed a decree dissolving the Assembly (something that even Bonifácio believed was the monarch's prerogative). Six deputies, including Bonifácio, were banished to France. However, they received a pension from the Brazilian government as long as they lived there. The Nativists who were persecuted during the "Bonifácia" were pardoned. But the dissolution of the Assembly did not signify an end to the careers of other deputies: 33 would later become Senators, 28 would be appointed Ministers of State, 18 would serve as provincial presidents, 7 would sit as members of the first State Council, and 4 would act as regents.

On 13 November 1823, Pedro I placed the newly established Council of State in charge of writing a proposal for a new Constitution—which was finished in just fifteen days. The Council of State was formed by men from both the Luso-Brazilians and the Nativists. The Council used the partly completed project which had been crafted in the Constituent Assembly as a model for the new charter. After finishing it, a copy was sent to all Municipal Chambers for a decision as to whether or not to accept the new charter and present it to a new Constituent Assembly for endorsement. But some of the Municipal Chambers suggested that, instead, it should immediately be approved as the Brazil's Constitution. Once the idea had been aired, the vast majority of the Municipal Chambers, composed of councilmen elected by the Brazilian people as their local representatives, voted in favor of its instant adoption as the Constitution of the Empire. The first Brazilian Constitution was then promulgated and solemnly sworn in the Cathedral of Rio de Janeiro on 25 March 1824.

=== The liberal opposition ===
Although liberal in its content, the Constitution created a centralized government, where the provinces had no true autonomy. Desire for local control sparked a minor rebellion in some provinces in the northeast in 1824 which was easily suppressed, but the incident was enough to reveal discontent with the State's organization. At the end of 1825, a secessionist rebellion began in Cisplatina, the southernmost Brazilian province. Unlike the rest of the nation, its population consisted of both Luso-American and Hispano-American elements, a result of colonial times when sovereignty over the region shifted between Portugal and Spain. The United Provinces of South America (a former Spanish colony later known as Argentina) formally annexed the Brazilian province. The Empire responded with a declaration of war, which "was to draw Brazil into a long, inglorious, and ultimately futile war in the south" – the Cisplatine War. João VI died in March 1826, a few months after the outbreak, and Pedro I inherited the Portuguese crown, becoming King Pedro IV. Brazil and Portugal were again reunited—though only in a personal union—barely 2 years following the end of the war for Brazilian independence. Pedro I quickly abdicated the Portuguese crown in favor of his eldest daughter Maria II, but as she was a minor, he retained involvement in Portuguese affairs.

When the General Assembly was reopened in May 1826, more than 2 years after the dissolution of the Constituent Assembly by Pedro I, "suspicions about the sincerity of his attachment to constitutional government and to Brazil's independence were already widespread." Pedro I and a considerable part of the legislature shared a similar ideal, that is, "of a constitutional order endowed with an elected legislature and independent judiciary but directed by a supreme ruler whose superior talents and favourable star gave him uncontested authority." Another part of the parliament "accepted the people-or more, precisely, that section of the population who qualified as 'civilized' [that is, the ruling circles only]-to be the source of authority, with they representatives they elected controlling power." The latter would form a loose alliance – known as the first Liberal Party – which also advocated a greater and true provincial autonomy. Thus, a "clash between two conflicting ideologies underlay all the battles that raged from 1826 to 1831 over the organization of the governance, the functioning of the political process, and the goals to be pursued in international affairs." The situation only worsened in 1828 when the war in the south ended with the loss of Cisplatina, which became the independent republic of Uruguay and the usurpation of Maria II's throne by Prince Miguel, Pedro I's younger brother. Uncapable of dealing with Brazil and Portugal affairs at the same time, the emperor abdicated in behalf of his son (who became Pedro II) on 7 April 1831 and immediately departed for Europe to restore his daughter to her throne.

=== Regency ===
==== A troubled regency ====
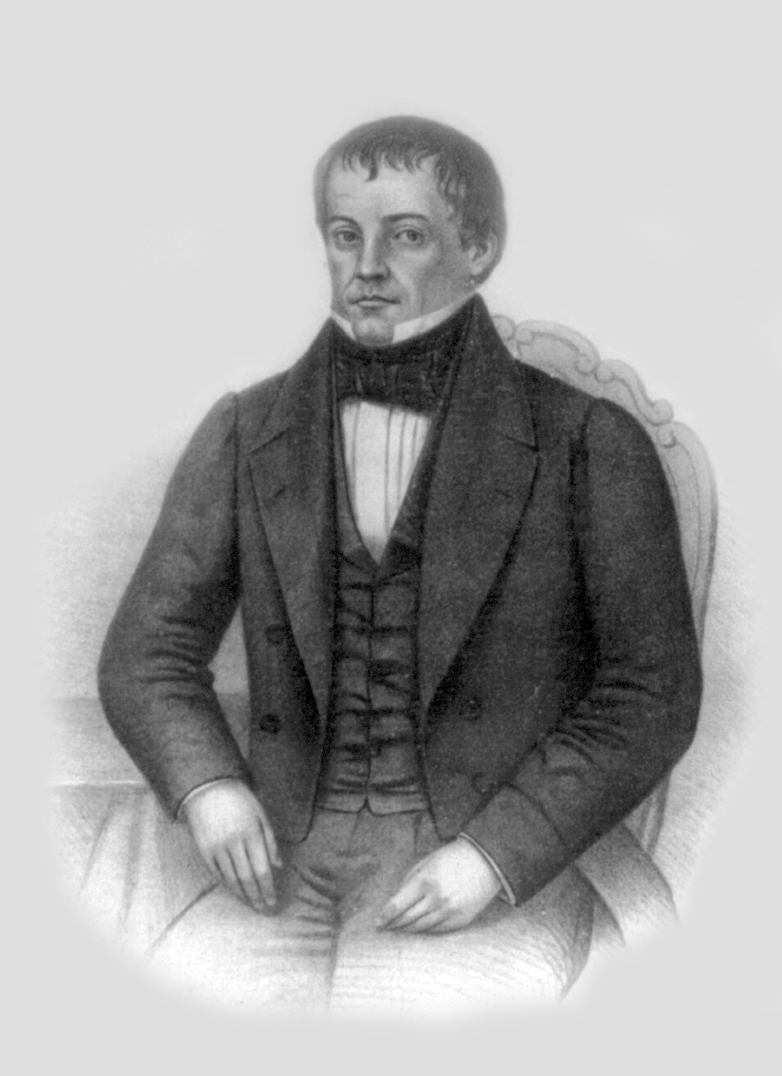
Diogo Antônio Feijó, regent, leader of the Nativists and later of the second Liberal Party. He staged a failed coup to rule as dictator in 1832 and was later arrested due to his involvement in the Liberal rebellions of 1842.

Since Pedro II would only be 18 in 1843, an elected regency was created to replace the emperor during his minority. Joaquim Nabuco, writing in the 1890s, remarked that the Brazilian republicans saw this period as their chance to prove that the country could survive in peace without a monarch as superior arbiter, as a neutral character above rival parties. However, this republican experience proved itself to be a complete disaster: as a republic, Brazil was no better than its Hispanic-American neighbors. The regency had little effective authority which resulted in nine years of chaos during which the country was plagued by rebellions and coup attempts initiated by unruly political factions.

The Liberal Party which assumed power on 7 April had been only a loose coalition representing "disparate interests, united only by their opposition to Pedro I." Although they were called liberals various groups within the coalition championed one or another liberal ideal while others opposed these points preferring to promote other aspects of liberalism. The party soon split into two factions: the republicans (also known as the "Extremists" or "Tatters") which was a small but aggressive group and the "moderate" liberals. The moderate liberals consisted of a coalition of the Nativists whose main leader was the priest Diogo Antônio Feijó and the Coimbra bloc–so-called because many of its supporters had graduated from Coimbra University. The Coimbra bloc's main leaders were Pedro de Araújo Lima (later Marquis of Olinda) and Bernardo Pereira de Vasconcelos. Vasconcelos acted not only as a leader but also as a mentor to the younger generation of his faction which included Honório Hermeto Carneiro Leão (later the Marquis of Paraná), Paulino Soares de Sousa (later the first Viscount of Uruguay) and Joaquim José Rodrigues Torres.

There were also other, smaller groups not related to the moderates of which the most important were the restorationists (or Caramurus) who called for the return of Pedro I as regent for his son. Beyond the need to fight the restorationist threat the only other common interest uniting the Nativists and the Coimbra bloc into the Moderate Party was their support of federalism. The Brazilian constitution was overly centralized and this was one of the main reasons behind their opposition to the former emperor who was openly against any constitutional amendment. The Moderate Party believed that by granting more autonomy to the provinces it could placate discontent and extinguish any separatist threat.

A constitutional amendment effecting greater decentralization was voted upon and approved in the Chambers of Deputies, but it still faced major opposition in the Senate. The priest Antônio Feijó planned a coup d’état in which he would assume dictatorial powers and the constitutional amendment would be enacted concurrently without the approval of the National Assembly (Parliament). On 30 July 1832 some Nativist deputies (in concert with Feijó) put a proposal before the Chamber that parliament be turned into a constituent assembly and that a new constitution be adopted using as part of their argument that the senate was filled with restorationist senators. The Deputy Carneiro Leão managed to successfully rally the other deputies against the Nativists' proposal and the coup attempt was crushed. The Coimbra bloc's firm actions prevented restriction of legal rights and kept Brazil from sliding into dictatorship during the regency even under the threat of rebellions and political crises.

==== The Additional Act and resulting rebellions ====
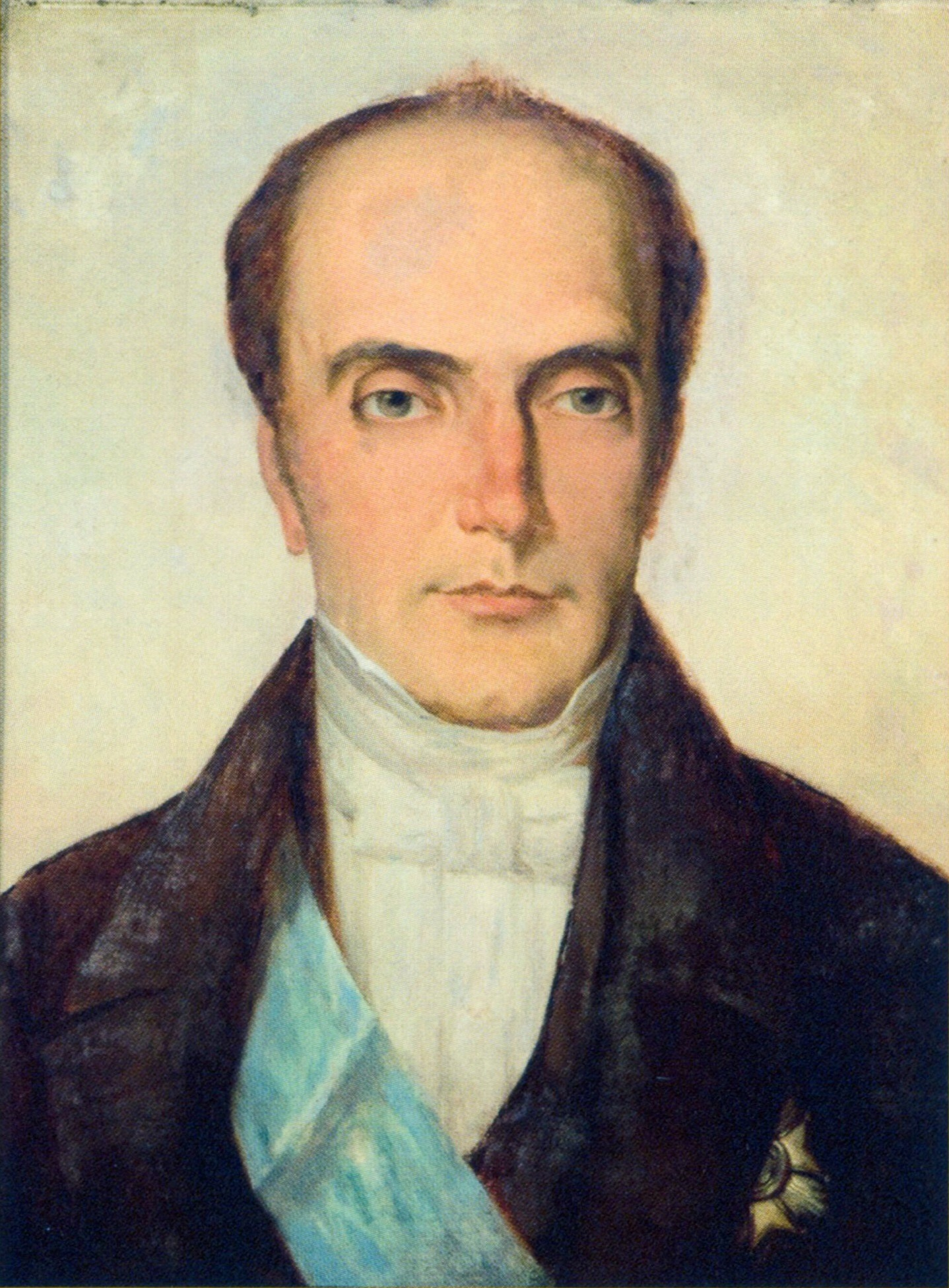
Pedro de Araújo Lima (Marquis of Olinda), regent and founder of the Conservative Party, of the Progressist League and of the third Liberal Party.

The constitutional amendment, called the Ato Adicional (Additional Act), was finally promulgated on 12 August 1834. Among its provisions was the establishment of a quasi-federal national structure due to administrative and political provincial decentralization. "Dissolution of power to the provinces, far from placating local ambitions and discontents, kindled them into flame. In the far north and the far south, civil wars broke out." The higher administrative and political provincial decentralization exacerbated conflicts between political parties, as whichever dominated the provinces would also gain control over the electoral and political system. Those parties which lost elections rebelled and tried to assume power by force. Rebellious factions, however, continued to uphold the Throne as a way of giving the appearance of legitimacy to their actions (that is, they were not in revolt against the monarchy per se). The Cabanagem (1835–40), the Sabinada (1837–38) and the Balaiada (1838–41) all followed this course, even though in some instances provinces attempted to secede and become independent republics (though ostensibly only so long as Pedro II was a minor). The exception was the Ragamuffin War, which began as yet another dispute between political factions in the province of Rio Grande do Sul but quickly evolved into a separatist rebellion financed by the Argentine dictator Don Manuel Rosas. But even in this case, the majority of the province's population, including the largest and most prosperous cities, remained loyal to the Empire.

In April 1835 an election was held to select a new regent. The outcome was problematic as no candidate won a majority of the vote. Feijó, the leader of the Nativists, garnered the most votes and assumed office on 12 October. News of the premature death of former emperor Pedro I on 24 September 1834 had arrived from Europe effectively removing the restorationist movement as a factor in national politics. Many restorationists joined the ranks of the Coimbra bloc. Both groups shared similar economic, social and ideological views. They were all firm monarchists and opposed Feijó. The death of Pedro I eliminated the chief difference between them as the Coimbra bloc was firmly opposed to his return. The first hints of what would later become the Conservative Party appeared when they began throwing their support to candidates other than Feijó and it became clearer after Deputy Carneiro Leão initiated talks with the restorationists in October 1834.

Once in office Feijó proved to be an authoritarian with little inclination to be accountable to parliament. By 1837 his government's credibility and support had disappeared. Uprisings both in the north and south had not been suppressed and other issues were ignored. "The country's needs were not being addressed." The reinvigorated Coimbra bloc intensified its efforts to remove Feijó from office due to inappropriate behavior and in August 1837 the regent resigned. He was replaced by Araújo Lima who appointed his colleagues to fill ministry portfolios. The Coimbra bloc "had come to power—not through a coup, not through a dynast's favor, but through the conquest of a representative majority in the Chamber."

This marked the extinction of the always weak Moderate Party, whose demise was symbolized with the death of Evaristo de Veiga in May, the last tie that kept united both Nativists and the Coimbra bloc. The Coimbra bloc began a policy aimed at restoring and enforcing order throughout Brazil. A new law was passed which built upon the Ato Adicional of 1834 to allow the national government to reassert control over provincial police and courts. This greatly enhanced the national government's ability to deal with rebels. However, no changes were made to the administrative and political autonomy granted to the provinces by the amendment of 1834. The Coimbra bloc's credibility was considerably enhanced by "the close links, both political and personal, that its leaders established with the booming coffee sector in the Paraíba valley just to the north of Rio de Janeiro city. Coffee exports quadrupled during the 1820s and doubled again between 1829 and 1835." "The economic boom strengthened the position of the national government, increasing its revenues and its ability to secure loans."

Feijo's Nativists allied with minor parties and remnants of other factions in opposition to the new government. These shared no common principles or ideology. "They were a pragmatic alliance involving everyone from republican radicals to moderate reformists to liberal monarchists to former restorationists." This group would evolve during the 1840s into the second "Liberal Party". Fearful that their adversaries would perpetuate themselves in power the Liberals began to call for a lowering of the age at which Pedro II would attain majority. They saw an opportunity to regain influence by doing away with the regency and instead dealing directly with a pliable young emperor. "Without experience, he might be manipulated by whoever brought him to power." Towards that end they allied themselves with a new and powerful political faction known as "The Courtier Faction" led by Aureliano de Sousa Oliveira Coutinho (later the Viscount of Sepetiba) who was one Feijó's supporters in the 30 July 1832 failed coup. The Courtier Faction had been formed by politicians and high-ranking servants in the Imperial Palace who were close to the young emperor.

== Consolidation ==
=== The Courtier Faction and Pedro II's early majority ===
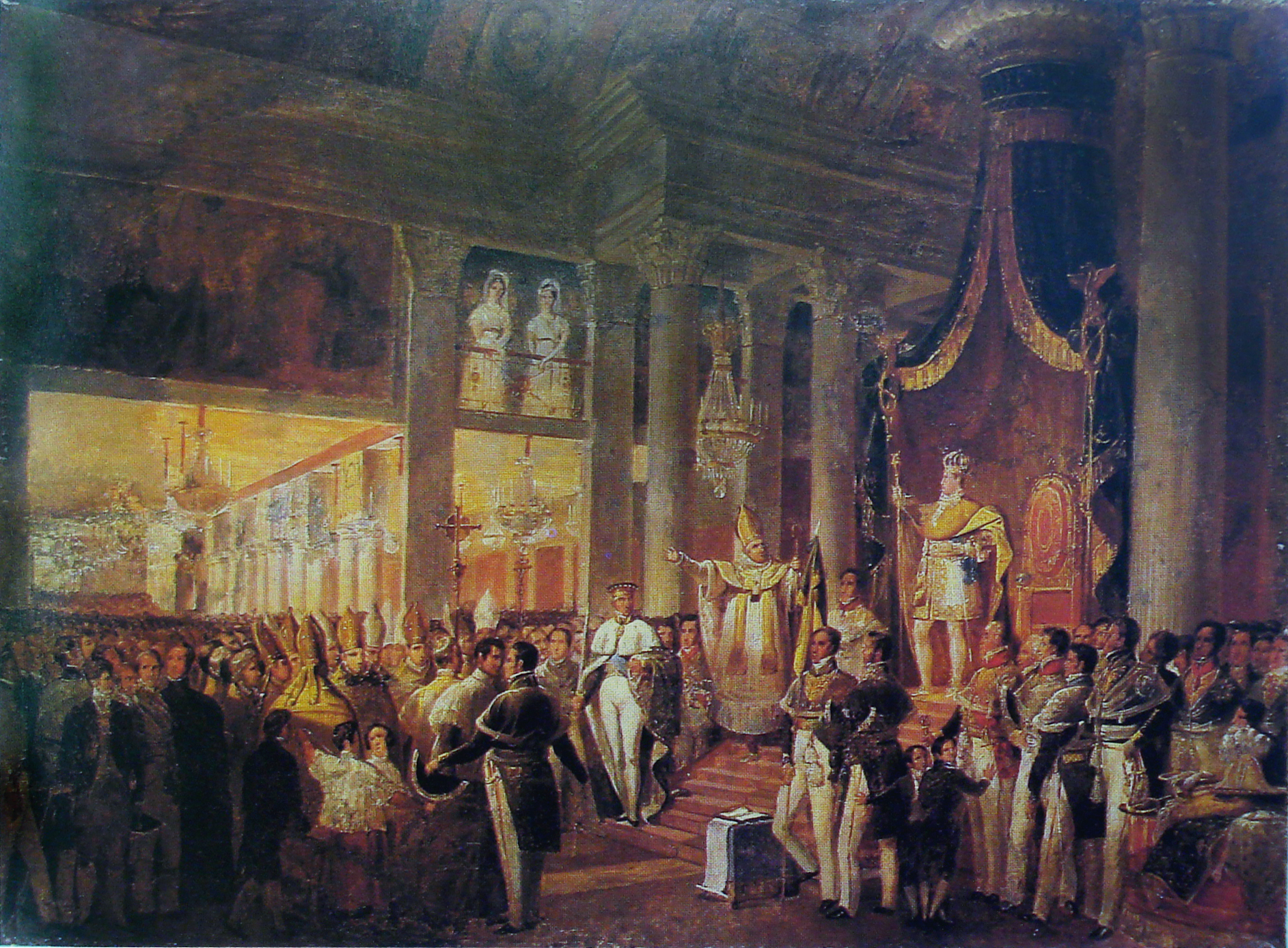
Coronation of Emperor Dom Pedro II, 18 July 1841.

The Coimbra bloc was not opposed to lowering the age of majority for the emperor but they demanded that any change should be made through legal means i.e. a constitutional amendment. After their experience of the perils and obstacles of government, the political figures – from both the Conservative and Liberal Parties – who had arisen during the 1830s became wary of taking on a greater role in ruling the nation. They looked to the Emperor as providing a fundamental and useful source of authority essential both for governing and for national survival. It was an ironic turn: the same politicians who opposed Pedro I for being a central figure in politics were now trying to put his son in that same position. Unlike the conservatives, however, the liberals were less scrupulous and with popular support and after pressuring the regent to accept the loss of his position declared Pedro II of age on 23 July 1840.

This outcome was predictable since 1838. When Araújo Lima was elected regent in place of Feijó he named Bernardo Pereira de Vasconcelos to one of the ministry portfolios and he soon became a de facto Prime Minister, with even more power than the regent himself. He "could not cooperate but had to dominate, and he could not tolerate centers of authority independent of his will. No wonder that even his allies at lengtht became resentful and rebellious". Vasconcelos also tried, unsuccessfully, to remove the Imperial Palace servants that were part of the Courtier Faction. Araújo Lima, disliked with the loss of power, removed his support to Vasconcelos' cabinet, who at the point had lost cohesion and resigned office on 18 April 1839. After that, the regent "could do no more than to construct a succession of ramshackle cabinets lacking support in the legislature". With the decline of the Coimbra bloc also came of Vasconcelos', whose political influence and power over the party was superseded by the next generation, mainly Carneiro Leão, Rodrigues Torres and Paulino de Sousa.

The Liberal cabinet, formed upon the assumption of majority by Pedro II, called national elections in 1840. These were so violent and fraudulent that they became known as "Eleições do cacete" ("Bludgeon elections"). The alliance between liberals and courtiers did not last long. The liberal ministers in the cabinet presented their resignations in an attempt to get rid of their courtier allies. The young and inexperienced emperor was compelled to choose between the ministers and the courtiers. The bluff failed and Pedro II, influenced by the courtiers, accepted the cabinet's resignation. On 23 March 1841 a new cabinet was nominated which included some ministers taken from the Coimbra bloc.

The liberals did not accept their loss of power gracefully. In May and June 1842 there followed three uprisings within the provinces of São Paulo, Minas Gerais and Rio de Janeiro itself. The pretext was a claim "to be acting against the tyrannical measures of the imperial government, which, they alleged, was holding the monarch captive." The rebels were easily defeated and by late August the rebellions were over. Among the rebel leaders was the former Regent Feijó who was arrested and died shortly afterwards in 1843.

Members of the Coimbra bloc began to call it the "Party of Order" in contrast to what they perceived as the "unruly" Liberals. Their suppression of the uprisings left them in a powerful position. In the cabinet there was increasing friction caused by Aureliano Coutinho who owed his seat as minister solely to his influence over Pedro II. It was widely known that he had been antagonistic towards the Party of Order from its inception. Aureliano "found himself increasingly ostracized and excluded by his fellow ministers". After a new legislature was seated on 1 January 1843, Aureliano's position worsened and the cabinet pressured him to resign. Pedro II did not want to lose Aureliano and instead opted to dismiss the entire cabinet on 20 January.

=== Rise of the Conservative Party ===
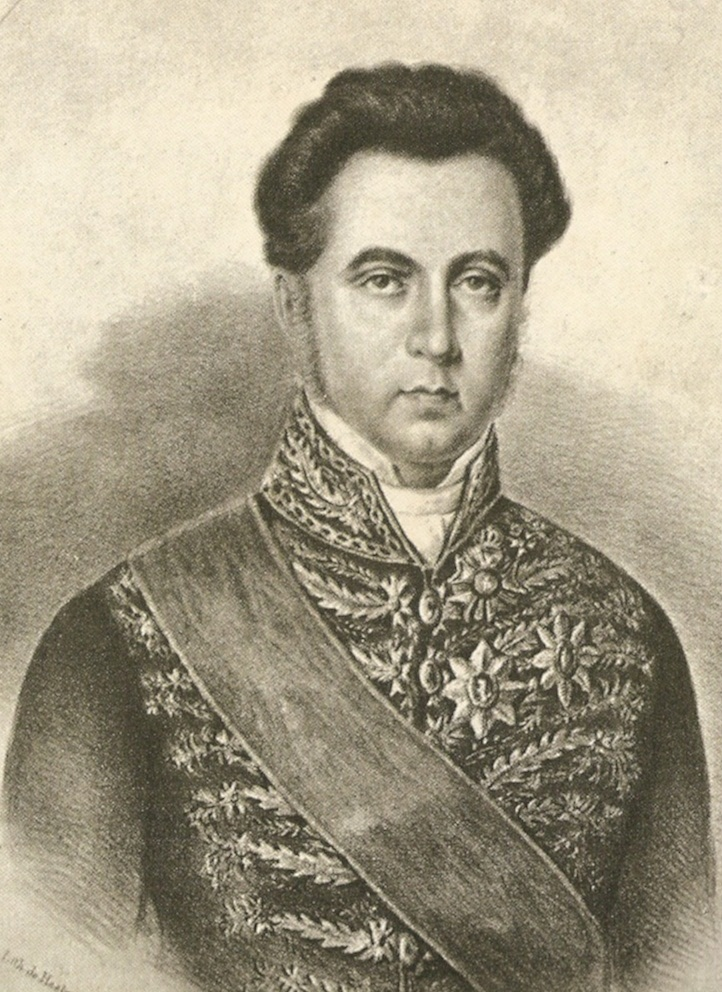
Aureliano de Sousa e Oliveira Coutinho (Viscount of Sepetiba), leader of the Courtier Faction.

On 20 January 1843 the emperor appointed Carneiro Leão, who was now a senator, to head a new cabinet. By personally selecting the cabinet members he became Brazil's de facto first prime minister. Prior to this, the emperor had always designated the cabinet ministers. Building upon this precedent, the office of prime minister would be officially instituted four years later with the title "President of the Council of Ministers". The Party of Order at this time held majorities in the Senate, the Chamber of Deputies and the Council of State. The new cabinet opposed amnesty for participants in the 1842 uprisings. This refusal was despite many involved having already been imprisoned for almost a year which rendered the possibilities for successful prosecution unlikely. Carneiro Leão acting as minister of Justice also pursued indictments against five senators who had collaborated during the revolts seeking a trial in the upper house. This came to dominate debate in the Senate and sidelined action on the government's legislative agenda during the ten months of the extended session. The cabinet's uncompromising position lost them the support of many who had cooperated with the ministry. A quarrel between Pedro II and Carneiro Leão led to the cabinet's resignation at the end of January 1844.

For the next four years the Party of Order stood in opposition to the Liberals. During this time they also witnessed the rise and fall of Aureliano Coutinho's "Courtier Faction" which was allied to the Liberal Party. The Courtier Faction held nearly absolute sway over Brazilian politics for a couple of years. This lasted until the emperor, now fully grown and experienced, purged everyone linked to the group, including Aureliano—whose influence in politics disappeared after an implicit ban from Pedro II precluded his holding any political post. The monarch made clear that he thereafter would make his own impartial decisions free from the influence of others. From February 1844 through May 1848 the country saw four cabinets in succession—all composed of members from the Liberal Party. The inability of these cabinets to produce any concrete results stood as testimony to their internal divisions. Progressive initiatives lay dormant including new technology (e.g., railroads and the electric telegraph) and new institutions (e.g., a primary school system). After the last Liberal cabinet resigned, Pedro II called upon the Party of Order to form a new cabinet. They were by then known simply as the "Conservative Party" due to their goal of "preserving" order and the constitutional monarchy. The former regent Pedro de Araújo Lima, the chief figure among the conservatives, assumed the office of president.

=== The Praieira revolt and the Platine War ===
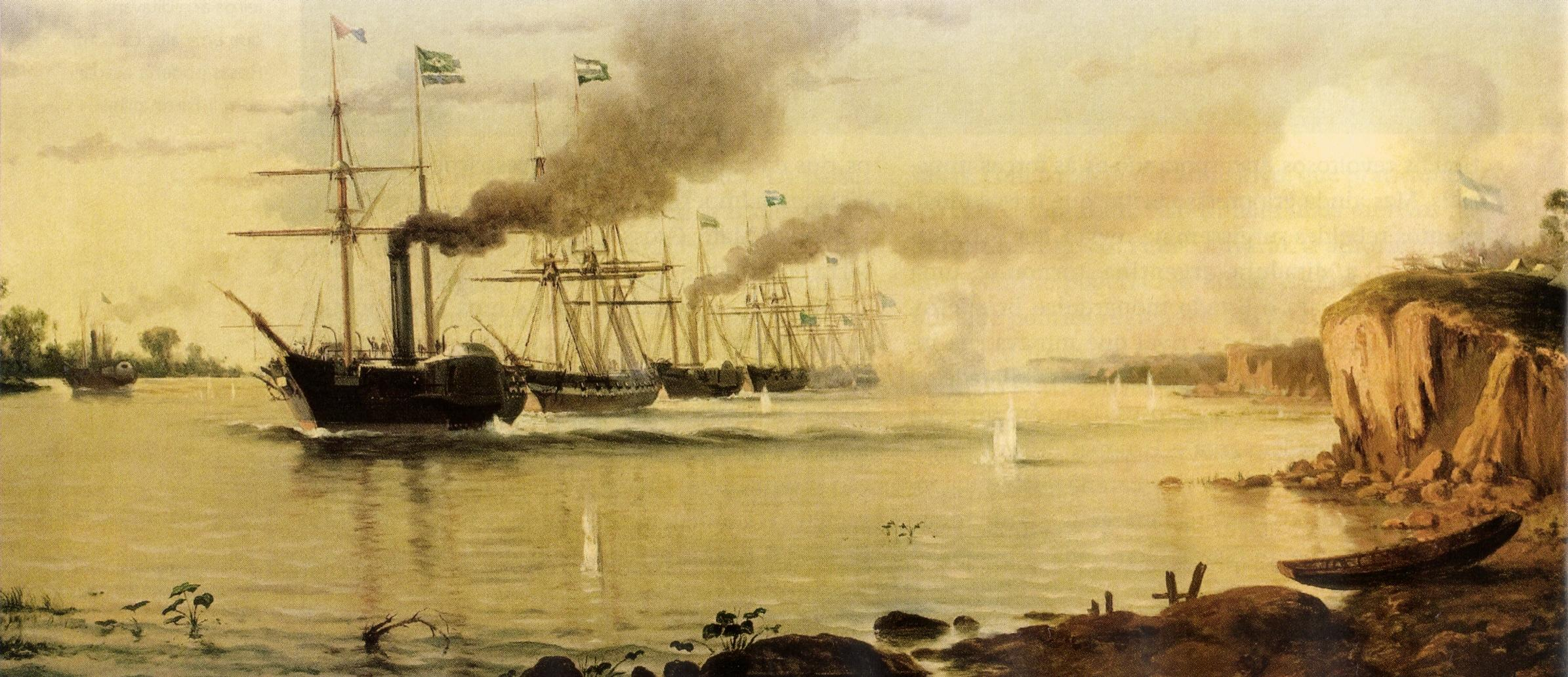
Argentine artillery attacking Brazilian warships during the Platine War.

Unlike their rivals, the liberals were incapable of taking turns in office. The most radical faction of the liberals in the province of Pernambuco, known as the Partido da Praia ("Party of the Beach"), were openly prepared to revolt and retake power by force. Although nominally liberal, the praieiros were in reality related to the "Courtier Faction" and had Aureliano Coutinho as their national leader. In a sense the rebellion would represent the last gasp of the once-powerful "Courtier Faction" which had languished all but defunct since 1847. The praieiros had no popular support and they knew that public opinion was against them—the more so as it became apparent they had no coherent rationale to justify rebellion. The rebellion which had begun on 7 November 1848 had a small reach and was crushed on 2 February 1849 when the praieiros were decisively defeated after attacking the capital of Pernambuco, Recife. The main consequences following the end of the Praieira revolt included the almost complete disappearance of the Liberal Party who were rejected by public opinion for its actions, consolidation of support for the parliamentary monarchy among Brazilians and the supremacy of the Conservative Party in politics during the next decade.

Another issue came in confronting the trade in illegally imported slaves which had been banned in 1826 as part of a treaty with Britain. The traffic continued unabated and the British government's passage of the Slave Trade (Brazil) Act 1845 (8 & 9 Vict. c. 122) authorized British warships to board Brazilian shipping and seize any found involved in the slave trade. A bill was issued on 4 September 1850 which gave the Brazilian government the authority to combat the illegal slave traffic. With this new tool, Brazil moved to eliminate the importation of slaves and Britain recognized that the trade had been at last suppressed.

With Brazil internally pacified and the British menace gone, the conservative cabinet could turn its attention to another serious foreign threat, the Argentine dictator Don Juan Manuel de Rosas. Rosas had sought to annex the Brazilian province of Rio Grande do Sul and planned the conquests of Paraguay, Uruguay and Bolivia. These moves threatened the creation of a dominion encompassing the territories of the old Viceroyalty of the Río de la Plata (a former Spanish colony in South America). Brazil's cabinet decided to forge alliances with other nations threatened by the dictator's ambitions and sent an army commanded by Luis Alves de Lima e Silva (later the Dukes of Caxias) to Uruguay which crossed the border on 4 September 1851. The Brazilian army split into two parts. Half of it, consisting of a division along with Uruguayan forces and Argentine rebel troops, invaded Argentina. On 3 February 1852, the allies defeated an army led by Rosas who fled to the United Kingdom. The victory over the Argentine dictator was followed by a period of stability and prosperity in Brazil during the 1850s. Chile was the only Latin American nation of the era which was comparable to Brazil in political cohesion and economic strength.

== Growth ==
=== The Conciliation policy ===
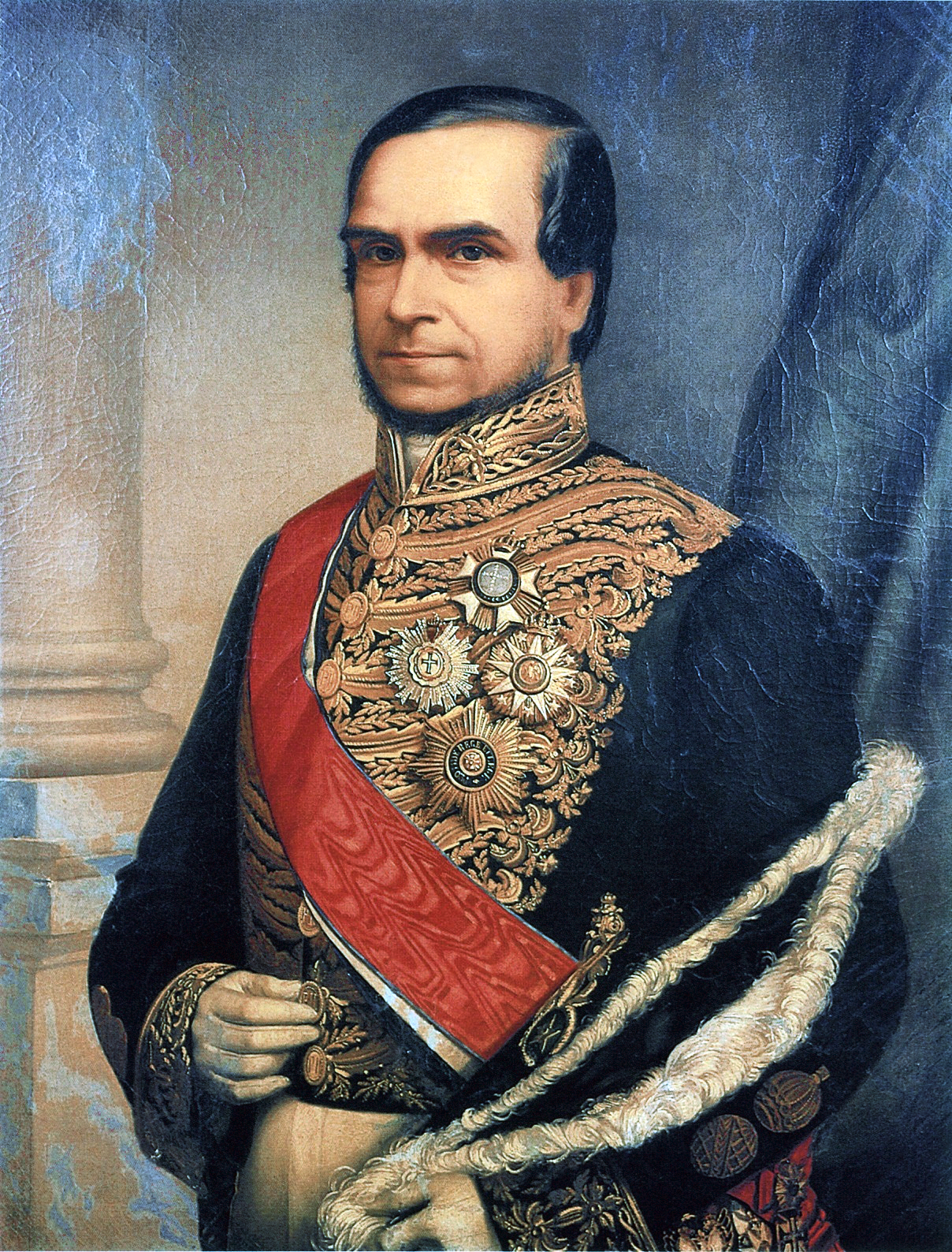
Honório Hermeto Carneiro Leão (Marquis of Paraná), one of the main figures in national politics from 1831 until 1856.

On 6 September 1853 Carneiro Leão was appointed President of the Council of Ministers and charged with organizing a new cabinet. He was at this time the most influential politician in the country and leader of the Conservative Party. Emperor Pedro II wished to advance his ambitious plan: the Conciliation. The goal of the Conciliation was to put an end to the recurrent factional conflicts which had started with the Restorationists at the beginning of the 1830s and had been continued by the Liberals. It had become usual for parties which were ousted from power in elections to attempt to regain it by force of arms as happened in 1842 and 1848. From that point on political disputes were to be settled democratically in the parliament. Both parties would be required to rise above partisanship and instead devote themselves to the common good of the nation.

The new president invited several Liberals to join the Conservative ranks and went so far as to name some as ministers. The cabinet was plagued from the beginning by strong opposition from Conservative Party members who repudiated the newly adopted conservatives believing that these did not truly share the party's ideals and were mainly interested in gaining public offices. Despite the mistrust Carneiro Leão demonstrated great resilience in fending off threats and overcoming obstacles and setbacks. Improvements throughout the country were made including the first railroad, steamship passenger lines, sewers, and public gas illumination as well as new incentives to promote immigration from Europe.

With the sudden and unexpected death of Carneiro Leão in September 1856, his cabinet would survive him by only a few months. The Emperor, a critic of the Conciliation as it had been implemented, learned to appreciate its merits and was eager to continue with it. Thus the cabinet survived Carneiro Leão, albeit with another president, until 4 May 1857.

The traditional Conservatives who opposed the Conciliation policy were led by Joaquim José Rodrigues Torres, the Viscount of Itaboraí, Eusébio de Queirós and Paulino Soares de Sousa, the Viscount of Uruguay—the "Saquarema Triumvirate". The Conservative Party was also known as "Saquarema Party" due to the coastal town of Saquarema in Rio de Janeiro province where Rodrigues Torres owned coffee plantations. These elder-statesmen were of the same generation as the late Carneiro Leão and had assumed the leadership of the Conservative Party after his death. Although conservative in name, they had repeatedly proven more progressive than their Liberal rivals in many areas.

=== A new party: the Progressist League ===
During the years following 1857 none of the cabinets survived long. They had quickly collapsed due to the lack of a majority in the Chamber of Deputies. The Conservative Party had split down the middle: on one side were the Traditionalists and on the other the Conciliators (who by 1860 were called simply "moderate conservatives"). The true reason for the schism was not the Conciliation policy as the speeches made it appear. In the wake of Carneiro Leão's cabinet a new generation of politicians had emerged eager to acquire more power inside the Conservative Party. These saw their path to the top ranks as being blocked by the conservative elders who would not easily relinquish control.

Remaining members of the Liberal Party, which had languished since the Praieira rebellion in 1849, took advantage of the Conservative Party's apparent dissolution to return to national politics with renewed strength. They delivered a powerful blow to the government when they managed to win several seats in the Chamber of Deputies in 1860. The Emperor asked the Marquis (later Duke) of Caxias, who had commanded the Brazilian forces in the Platine War and who was also a member of the Conservative Party, to head a new cabinet on 2 March 1861. The new government had to face a major challenge as the Chamber of Deputies was divided in three groups: the traditional or "pure" Conservatives, the "moderate" Conservatives and the Liberals. Caxias named men who were part of the pure and moderate Conservatives to the remaining portfolios in an effort to weaken the revigorated Liberal opposition and consolidate a workable governing majority.

The cabinet was unable to function due to a lack of true support internally. It was doomed when José Tomás Nabuco de Araújo Filho, the former Justice minister in the Conciliation cabinet, delivered a speech advocating a merger of moderate Conservatives and Liberals into a truly new political party. So well-received was this speech that both groups voted together as a single cohesive faction, leaving the government without a majority. The cabinet requested Pedro II dissolve the Chamber and call for new elections, but he refused. With no remaining alternative, the ministers resigned. On 24 May 1862 the Emperor named a member of the Moderate-Liberal coalition to form a new cabinet. The new political party, in which the majority of members were former Conservatives, was called the "Progressist League".

It was the end of 14 years of Conservative dominance in national politics. The period had marked a time of peace and prosperity for Brazil. "The political system functioned smoothly. Civil liberties were maintained. A start had been made on the introduction into Brazil of railroad, telegraph and steamship lines. The country was no longer troubled by the disputes and conflicts that had racked it during its first thirty years."

This tranquility disappeared when the British consul in Rio de Janeiro, William Dougal Christie, nearly sparked a war between Britain and Brazil. Christie believed in Gunboat diplomacy and sent an ultimatum containing abusive demands arising out of two minor incidents at the end of 1861 and early in 1862. The first was the sinking of a commercial barque on the coast of Rio Grande do Sul and the ensuing ransack of the wreck by local inhabitants. The second was the arrest of drunken British officers who were causing a disturbance in the streets of Rio. The Brazilian government refused to yield and Christie issued orders for British warships to capture Brazilian merchant vessels as indemnity. Brazil's Navy prepared for imminent conflict, the purchase of coastal artillery was ordered, several ironclads were authorized and coastal defenses were given permission to fire upon any British warship that tried to capture Brazilian merchant ships. Pedro II was the main reason for Brazil's resistance as he rejected any suggestion of yielding. This response came as a surprise to Christie, who changed his tenor and proposed a peaceful settlement through international arbitration. The Brazilian government presented its demands and severed diplomatic ties with Britain in June 1863 upon seeing the British government's position weaken.

== Apogee ==
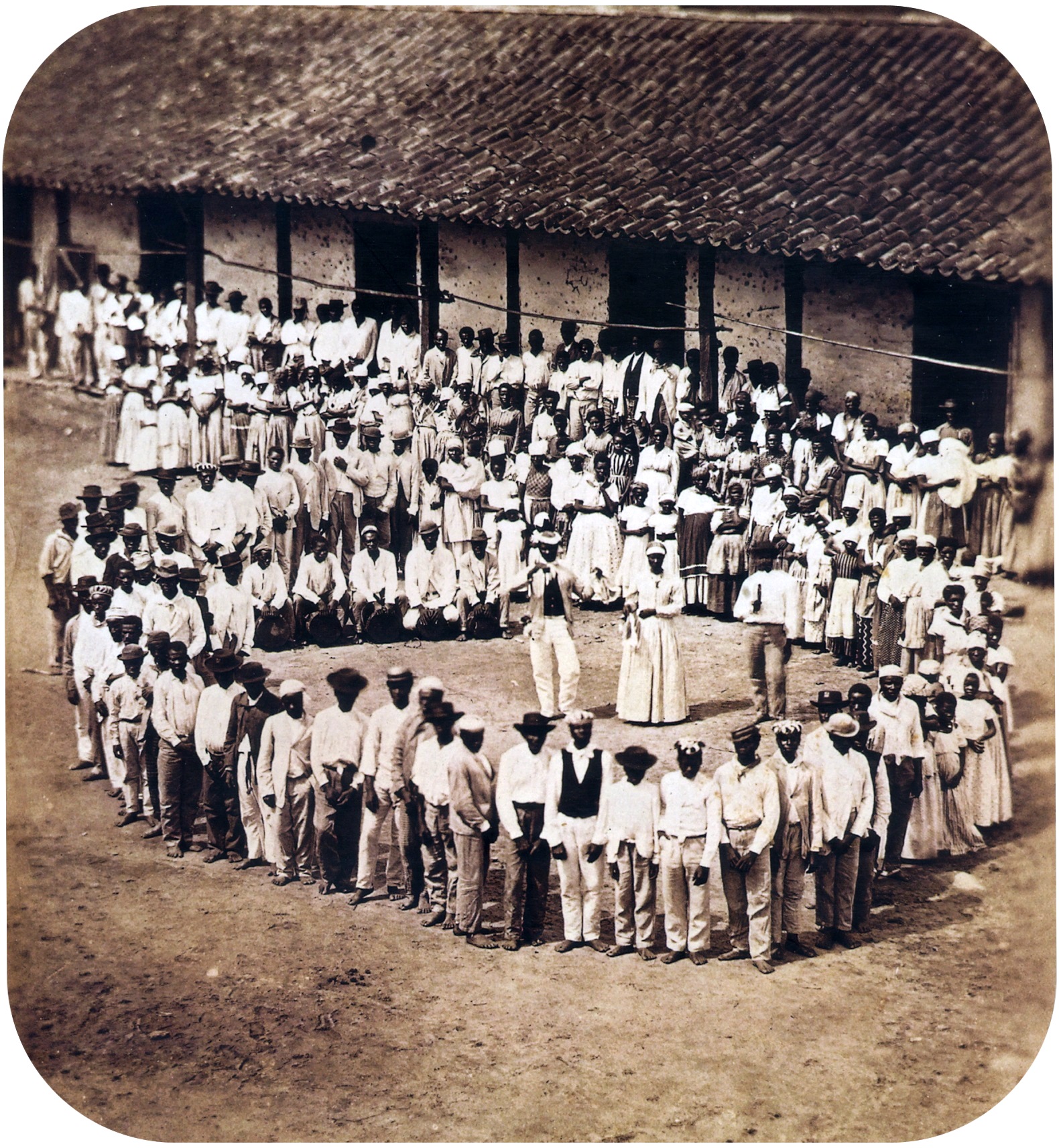
A large group of slaves gathered on a farm in the province of Minas Gerais (Brazilian southeast), 1876

The diplomatic victory over the British Empire and the military victory over Uruguay in 1865, followed by the successful conclusion of the war with Paraguay in 1870, marked the beginning of the "golden age" of the Brazilian Empire. The Brazilian economy grew rapidly; railroad, shipping and other modernization projects were started; immigration flourished. The Empire became known internationally as a modern and progressive nation, second only to the United States in the Americas; it was a politically stable economy with a good investment potential.

In March 1871, Pedro II named the conservative José Paranhos, Viscount of Rio Branco as the head of a cabinet whose main goal was to pass a law to immediately free all children born to female slaves. The controversial bill was introduced in the Chamber of Deputies in May and faced "a determined opposition, which commanded support from about one third of the deputies and which sought to organize public opinion against the measure." The bill was finally promulgated in September and became known as the "Law of Free Birth". Rio Branco's success, however, seriously damaged the long-term political stability of the Empire. The law "split the conservatives down the middle, one party faction backed the reforms of the Rio Branco cabinet, while the second—known as the escravocratas (English: slavocrats)—were unrelenting in their opposition", forming a new generation of ultraconservatives.

The "Law of Free Birth", and Pedro II's support for it, resulted in the loss of the ultraconservatives' unconditional loyalty to the monarchy. The Conservative Party had experienced serious divisions before, during the 1850s, when the Emperor's total support for the conciliation policy had given rise to the Progressives. The ultraconservatives led by Eusébio, Uruguai and Itaboraí who opposed conciliation in the 1850s had nonetheless believed that the Emperor was indispensable to the functioning of the political system: the Emperor was an ultimate and impartial arbiter when political deadlock threatened. By contrast, this new generation of ultraconservatives had not experienced the Regency and early years of Pedro II's reign, when external and internal dangers had threatened the Empire's very existence; they had only known prosperity, peace and a stable administration. To them—and to the ruling classes in general—the presence of a neutral monarch who could settle political disputes was no longer important. Furthermore, since Pedro II had clearly taken a political side on the slavery question, he had compromised his position as a neutral arbiter. The young ultraconservative politicians saw no reason to uphold or defend the Imperial office.

=== Paraguayan War ===
As the threat of war with the British Empire became more real, Brazil had to turn its attention to its southern frontiers. Another civil war had begun in Uruguay turning its political parties against each other. The internal conflict led to the murder of Brazilians and looting of their property in Uruguay. Brazil's government decided to intervene, fearful of giving any impression of weakness in the face of conflict with the British. A Brazilian army invaded Uruguay in December 1864 beginning the brief Uruguayan War, which ended on 20 February 1865.

Meanwhile, in December 1864 the dictator of Paraguay, Francisco Solano López took advantage of the situation to establish his country as a regional power. The Paraguayan army invaded the Brazilian province of Mato Grosso (currently the state of Mato Grosso do Sul), triggering the Paraguayan War. Four months later, Paraguayan troops invaded Argentine territory as a prelude to an attack upon the Brazilian province of Rio Grande do Sul.

== Decline ==
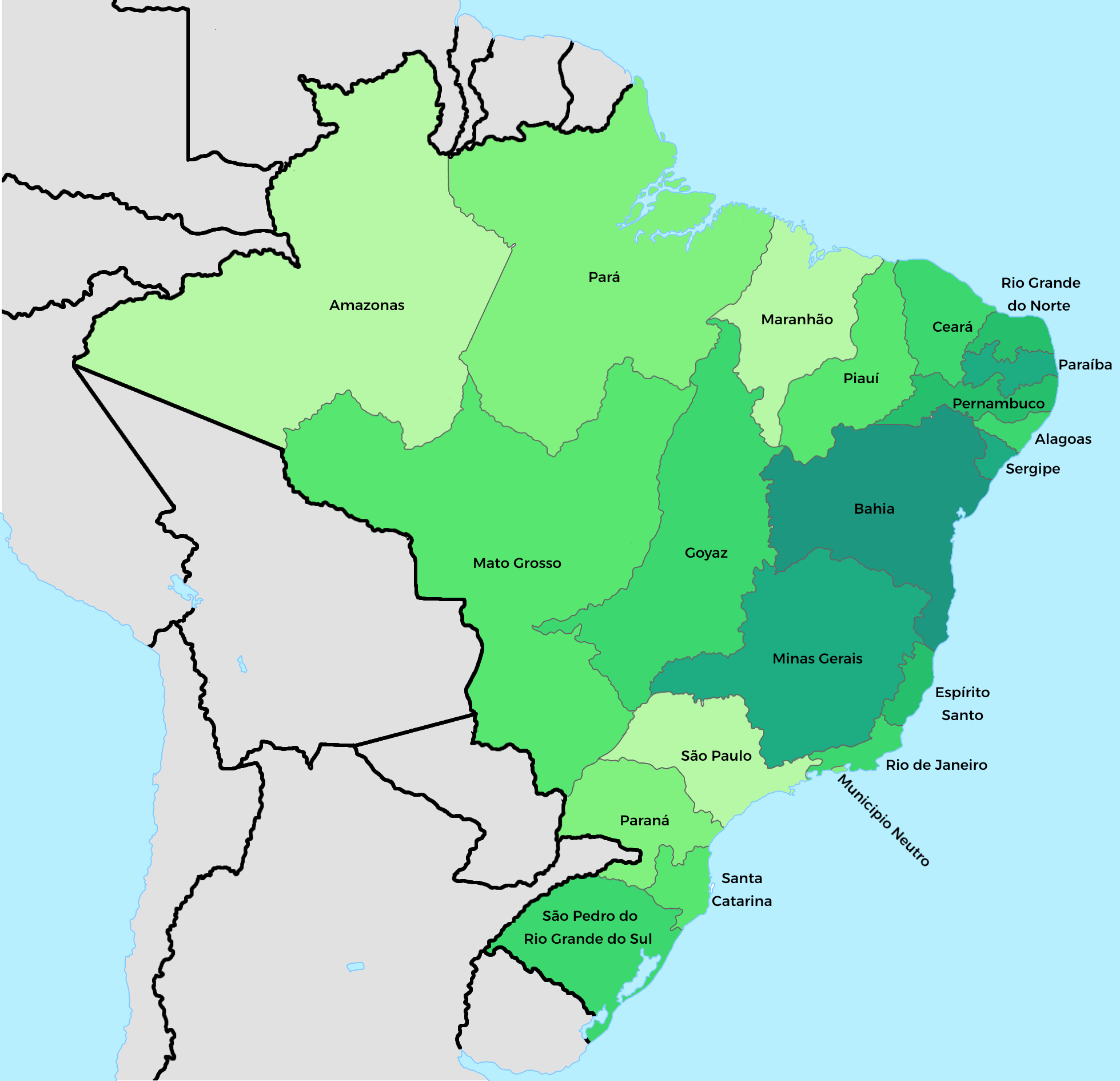
The Empire of Brazil, c. 1889. Cisplatina had been lost since 1828 and two new provinces had been created since then (Amazonas and Paraná)

The weaknesses in the monarchy took many years to become apparent. Brazil continued to prosper during the 1880s, with the economy and society both developing rapidly, including the first organized push for women's rights (which would progress slowly over the next decades). By contrast, letters written by Pedro II reveal a man grown world-weary with age, increasingly alienated from current events and pessimistic in outlook. He remained meticulous in performing his formal duties as Emperor, albeit often without enthusiasm, but he no longer actively intervened to maintain stability in the country. His increasing "indifference towards the fate of the regime" and his inaction to protect the imperial system once it came under threat have led historians to attribute the "prime, perhaps sole, responsibility" for the dissolution of the monarchy to the emperor himself.

The lack of an heir who could feasibly provide a new direction for the nation also threatened the long-term prospects for the Brazilian monarchy. The Emperor's heir was his eldest daughter, Isabel, who had no interest in, nor expectation of, becoming the monarch. Even though the Constitution allowed female succession to the throne, Brazil was still a very traditional, male-dominated society, and the prevailing view was that only a male monarch would be capable as head of state. Pedro II, the ruling circles and the wider political establishment all considered a female successor to be inappropriate, and Pedro II himself believed that the death of his two sons and the lack of a male heir were a sign that the Empire was destined to be supplanted.

A weary Emperor who no longer cared for the throne, an heir who had no desire to assume the crown, an increasingly discontented ruling class who were dismissive of the Imperial role in national affairs: all these factors presaged the monarchy's impending doom. The means to achieve the overthrow of the Imperial system would soon appear within the Army ranks. Republicanism had never flourished in Brazil outside of certain elitist circles, and had little support in the provinces. A growing combination of republican and Positivist ideals among the army's junior and mid-level officer ranks, however, began to form a serious threat to the monarchy. These officers favored a republican dictatorship, which they believed would be superior to the liberal democratic monarchy. Beginning with small acts of insubordination at the beginning of the 1880s, discontent in the army grew in scope and audacity during the decade, as the Emperor was uninterested and the politicians proved incapable of re-establishing the government's authority over the military.

== Fall ==
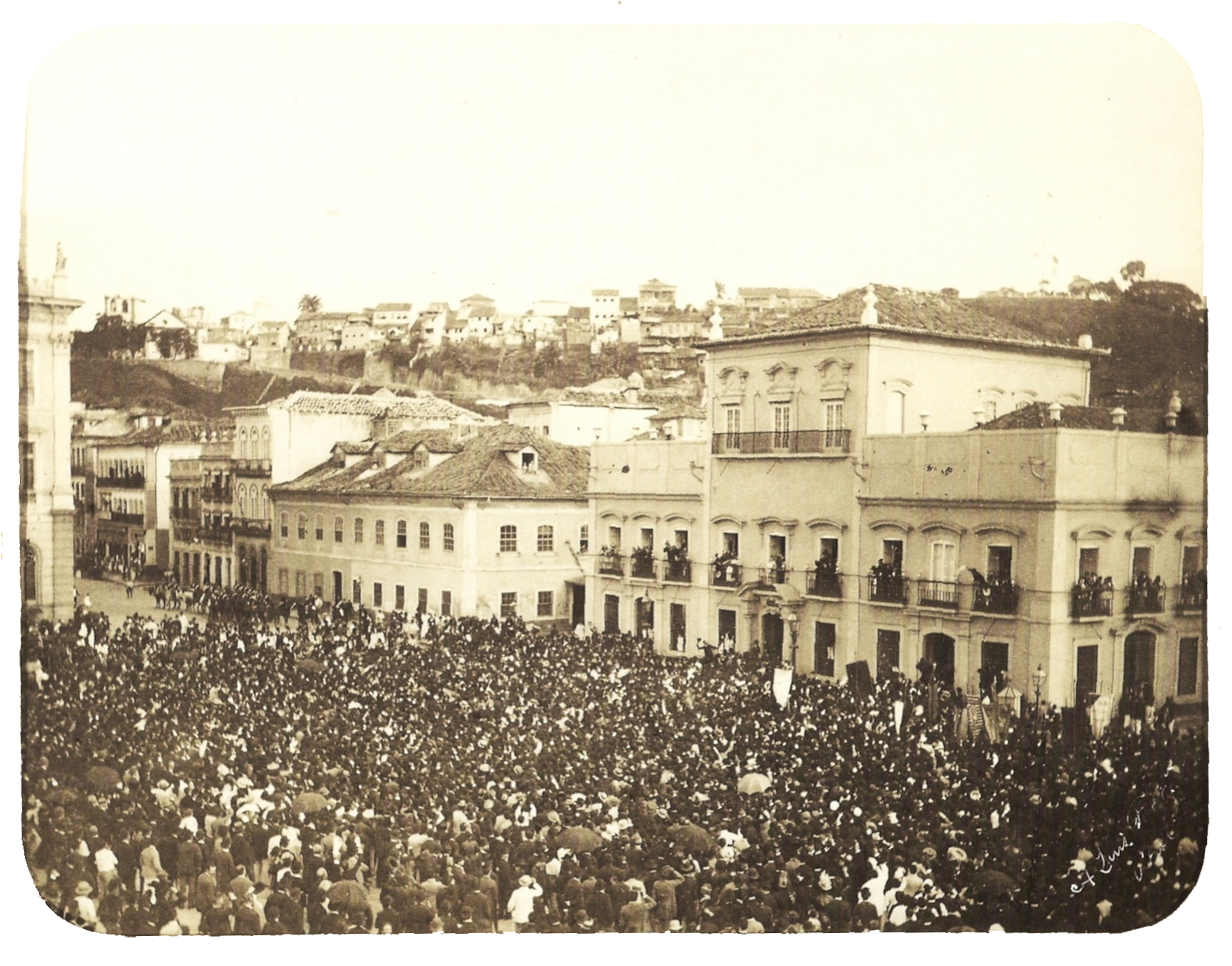
A few moments after signing the Golden Law, Princess Isabel is greeted from the central balcony of the City Palace by a huge crowd below in the street

The nation enjoyed considerable international prestige during the final years of the Empire and had become an emerging power in the international arena. While Pedro II was receiving medical treatment in Europe, the parliament passed, and Princess Isabel signed on 13 May 1888, the Golden Law, which completely abolished slavery in Brazil. Predictions of economic and labor disruption caused by the abolition of slavery proved to be unfounded. Nonetheless, the end of slavery was the final blow to any remaining belief in the crown's neutrality, and this resulted in an explicit shift of support to Republicanism by the ultraconservatives—themselves backed by rich and powerful coffee farmers who held great political, economic and social power in the country.

To avert a republican backlash, the government exploited the credit readily available to Brazil as a result of its prosperity to fuel further development. The government extended massive loans at favorable interest rates to plantation owners and lavishly granted titles and lesser honors to curry favor with influential political figures who had become disaffected. The government also indirectly began to address the problem of the recalcitrant military by revitalizing the moribund National Guard, by then an entity which existed mostly only on paper.

The measures taken by the government alarmed civilian republicans and the positivists in the military. The republicans saw that it would undercut support for their own aims, and were emboldened to further action. The reorganization of the National Guard was begun by the cabinet in August 1889, and the creation of a rival force caused the dissidents among the officer corps to consider desperate measures. For both groups, republicans and military, it had become a case of "now or never". Although there was no desire among the majority of Brazilians to change the country's form of government, republicans began pressuring army officers to overthrow the monarchy.

They launched a coup and instituted the republic on 15 November 1889. The few people who witnessed what occurred did not realize that it was a rebellion. Historian Lídia Besouchet noted that, "[r]arely has a revolution been so minor." Throughout the coup Pedro II showed no emotion, as if unconcerned about the outcome. He dismissed all suggestions put forward by politicians and military leaders for quelling the rebellion. The Emperor and his family were sent into exile on 17 November. Although there was significant monarchist reaction after the fall of the Empire, this was thoroughly suppressed, and neither Pedro II nor his daughter supported a restoration. Despite being unaware of the plans for a coup, once it occurred and in light of the Emperor's passive acceptance of the situation, the political establishment supported the end of the monarchy in favor of a republic. They were unaware that the goal of the coup leaders was the creation of a dictatorial republic rather than a presidential or parliamentary republic.

== See also ==
- Empire of Brazil
