= Albuera (ship) =

Several ships have been named Albuera, originally for the Battle of Albuera (1811):

- Albuera (1811 ship) was launched at Sunderland. She was wrecked in November 1827.
- Albuera (1826 ship) was launched at Aberdeen. A privateer captured her in 1828, but she returned to her owners. She was wrecked in October 1829.
- Albuera (1854 ship) was launched at Moulmain (British Burma), in 1854. She was last listed in 1881.
- Albuera (1874 ship), of 655 GRT, was built by J.Hillis at Bridgetown, Nova Scotia. She was wrecked in 1888.

== See also ==
- HMS Albuera
