= Night of the Bottle Fight =

1831 brawl in Brazil

The Night of the Bottle Fight was an incident in the Empire of Brazil in 1831 between Portuguese supporters of the Emperor Dom Pedro I and Brazilians who opposed him. It was one of the events leading to Dom Pedro's abdication in April 1831.

== History ==
The Night of the Bottle Fight involved a riot that occurred in opposition to Pedro I (then emperor of Brazil). In 1830, prior to the Night of the Bottle Fight, Líbero Badaró, a liberal journalist, was assassinated in São Paulo for denouncing Pedro I's policies. The perpetrators were allied with the emperor's politicians. The assassination unleashed a wave of protests against Pedro I's government.

Opposition continued in March 1831, when Pedro I travelled to Minas Gerais and was received with hostility by the locals. The conflict reached its climax on the night of March 13, when, during a party for the emperor's reception organized by his Portuguese supporters, Brazilians attacked with stones and bottles. This involved a dispute between allies from the Portuguese party that favored the emperor, and liberals from the Brazilian party who opposed him. This episode played an important role in the political crisis that resulted in the abdication of Dom Pedro I on 7 April 1831.
