= Irish and German Mercenary Soldiers' revolt =

1828 military revolt in Brazil by Irish and German mercenaries

Mercenary Revolt
Date	June 9–11, 1828
Location	Rio de Janeiro, Empire of Brazil
Result	Revolt suppressed

Belligerents
Empire of Brazil; Kingdom of France; United Kingdom	Irish mercenaries German mercenaries

Commanders and leaders
(Empire of Brazil) Dom Pedro I (Empire of Brazil) Miguel de Frias	August von Steinhousen

Strength
(Empire of Brazil) Effective military police of Rio de Janeiro: 1,000 Brazilian Recruits; 600 French Marines (United Kingdom) 400 Royal Marines	3,000+

Casualties and losses
120 dead 180 wounded	240 dead 300 wounded

The Irish and German revolt (Portuguese: Revolta dos Mercenários) in Brazil was a revolt of German and Irish mercenaries in 1828 during the Cisplatine War of 1825–1828. The immigrants, who were recruited in their homelands to come to Brazil, discovered that the promises made to them by the Brazilian government were not fulfilled. In the revolt, the Irish and Germans took control of large parts of Rio de Janeiro. Citizens of the town and troops from French and British warships suppressed the revolt.

== Background ==
The Cisplatine War (1825–1828) between the Empire of Brazil and the United Provinces of the Río de la Plata over Cisplatina (present-day Uruguay), was not going well for either side. Argentine victories on land were offset by Brazil's effective control over the Río de la Plata and the naval blockade imposed on the port of Buenos Aires.

== The recruitment ==
Pedro I, the Brazilian emperor, sent colonel William Cotter back to his native Ireland to recruit Irish mercenary soldiers. Cotter arrived in early January 1827; no mention was made to the Irish of their being recruited as mercenaries. Instead, it was suggested that they would be needed to join a militia in Brazil but that this would not interfere with their farming endeavors.

Advertisements were run in local newspapers, and notices were posted on numerous church doors, mainly in County Cork and in County Waterford. Cotter promised free passage, free land – 50 acres for each family, six shillings per day, and military training (local militia only). No mention of the war against the Argentines was ever made.

Almost 3,000 mostly poor and illiterate people quickly volunteered to make the long and dangerous sea voyage. Some sold what little they owned to buy farm implements for their new life in Brazil. Most apparently did not realize that they had been recruited to fight as mercenaries. 2,700 people actually showed up on sailing day, and boarded the nine ships anchored in Cork Harbour.

== The voyage to Brazil ==
The first ship sailed for Rio de Janeiro in August 1827, and the rest of the fleet soon followed. Two of the ships, the Eliza and the Charlotte and Maria, were shipwrecked along the way.

== The uprising ==
Once ashore in Rio de Janeiro, the Irish were assigned to several barracks buildings. They complained of poor food, and of no replacement clothing for the sea voyage rags that had largely rotted off of them. Some of the Irish simply refused to join the Imperial Brazilian Army, claiming that they had been falsely recruited. Several hundred of these holdouts and their families were finally sent, in March 1828, to the town of Taperoá, in Bahia, to farm. Those who did join the army were subject to drilling under unpopular officers offset by endless hours of idleness. Relief, and trouble, were readily available to all the mercenaries at the local grog shops in the form of a cheap yet powerful rum, called cachaça.

Rio de Janeiro's black slaves and the Irish did not get along. Taunts of 'white slaves' when the Irish first landed escalated into individual fights, then large scale brawls, and finally, into murders by roving bands on both sides in the dark streets.

Unrest grew among both the Irish and the German mercenaries due to rough treatment, non-payment of wages, general misery and rumors of going into battle soon. The similarly recruited German mercenary soldiers started the Great Mercenary Revolt on 9 June 1828. When one of them was sentenced to fifty lashes for a minor infraction, which was quintupled to 250, after 210 lashes the Germans freed their comrade, and attacked the officer, who fled for his life. Word of the German revolt quickly reached the Irish, and about 200 Irish joined. Weapons and liquor were seized. Irish sources state that the homes of a few hated officers were looted and burned by marauding bands. Brazilian sources record that whole blocks of downtown Rio de Janeiro were razed.

By the second day, it was realised that the available Brazilian troops in Rio de Janeiro were insufficient to quell the armed and drunk mobs. Black slaves, who needed no coaxing, and other citizens, were given arms and sent against the mercenaries. The Irish and Germans were slowly pushed from the streets and back into their barracks, their best defensive positions.

The emperor requested and received help from marines aboard British and French ships in the harbour. Not wanting to fight against them, many of the rebel barracks surrendered on the third day. The final barracks building was only taken by storm on the fourth morning with very heavy casualties on both sides.

== Aftermath ==
The surviving people were rounded up. The Germans were sent to outlying provinces in southern Brazil. At Brazil's expense, 1,400 of the 2,400 Irish who had arrived in January 1828 were sent back to Ireland in July 1828. They arrived home even poorer than when they had left.

The mutiny virtually destroyed two of emperor Pedro's supposed best units and ended his hopes for a land victory to augment his successful naval blockade of Argentina. Brazil and Argentina both agreed to give up their stalemated war. Pedro ratified the peace treaty on 28 August 1828, and the Cisplatina province became independent as Uruguay, a buffer state between Brazil and Argentina. Thus, the mercenaries can be considered to have significantly helped Uruguay become independent, though that was not their intent.

== See also ==
- Revolutions of Brazil
