= Declaration of majority of Pedro II =

Coup that declared Pedro II of age

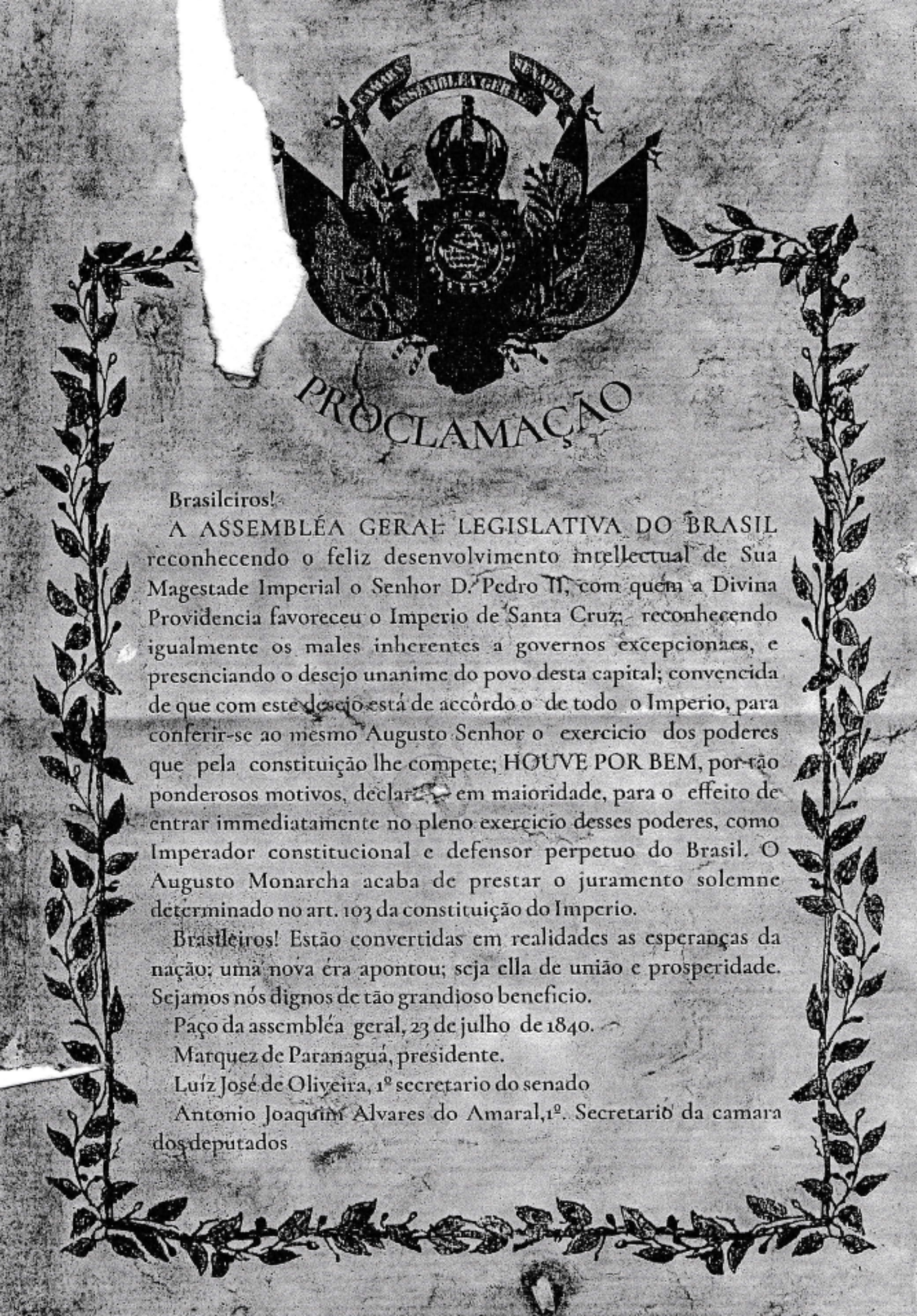
- Legislative document on the coming of age of Pedro II
- Native name: Declaração da Maioridade
- Date: July 23, 1840
- Location: Rio de Janeiro, Brazil
- Also known as: Majority Coup
- Outcome: Pedro II takes over as Emperor; The Second Reign begins

The Declaration of majority of Pedro II (Portuguese: Declaração da Maioridade de D. Pedro II ) was a document signed by the General Assembly of Brazil on 23 July 1840 which invested 14-year old Emperor Pedro II of Brazil with legal majority before the normal age of 18, in order to end the troublesome regency that ruled on his behalf and was mired in crises. The Liberal Party had mobilized the public, who pressured the Senate to declare Pedro II of legal age before he turned 15. In an 1834 precedent, the Portuguese Parliament had already declared the majority of Pedro II's sister Maria II, who became Queen of Portugal at age 15 without a regent.

The main purpose of this act was to transfer power to Pedro II in order that he, although inexperienced, could put an end to the political disputes that were affecting Brazil through his authority. They believed that the figure of the Emperor would prevent the revolts occurring in the country, such as the Ragamuffin War, the Sabinada, the Cabanagem, the Malê Revolt and the Balaiada.

To assist Pedro II, the liberal Ministry of the Majority was created. It was also known as the Ministry of the Brothers, because it was composed, among others, of the Andrada brothers—Antônio Carlos and Martim Francisco, from São Paulo—and the Cavalcanti brothers—the future Viscounts of Albuquerque and Suassuna, from Pernambuco.

== Accession to the throne de jure ==
Under pressure from society and the agrarian elite, Emperor Pedro I abdicated the throne on April 7, 1831, leaving his six-year-old son, Pedro de Alcântara, as the Brazilian heir.

=== Context of crisis in the First Reign ===
Characterized by economic, social and political crises, the First Reign preceded the Regency period and the government of Pedro II. During this period, the rules of the Brazilian electoral system were defined based on the Constitution of 1824, and the General Assembly, the highest legislative body, was created, comprising the Senate and the Chamber of Deputies.

There was also a rapprochement between the state and religion. The influence of the Catholic Church on national political relations was reflected in the requirement that clerics be treated as civil servants and receive income from the Empire. In addition, decisions taken by the Church had to be approved by the Emperor.

The decline and end of the First Reign is related to numerous factors, including the situation in Portugal, Brazil's liberal opposition and the loss of Cisplatina.

==== Cisplatine War ====
When the Uruguayans occupied the Cisplatine Province with the help of the Argentine government, political crises aggravated the government of Pedro I. After the loss of the territory, an economic crisis was created when the Spanish colonies recovered their sugar production. They also gained their independence and normalized exports.

In order to resolve the deficits after the defeat in the Cisplatine War, Pedro I fomented more dissatisfaction by issuing unbridled paper money. Inflation ensued and the poorest sections of the population lost their purchasing power.

==== Crown succession crisis in Portugal ====
After the Cisplatine War, King João VI appointed Pedro as his successor in Portugal. In May 1826, he accepted and returned to his native country to become King Pedro IV. However, the Brazilian constitution prohibited the Emperor of the country from holding the title of Regent of Portugal at the same time.

A month after being crowned Portuguese king, Pedro I abdicated the throne and guaranteed the succession to his firstborn, Maria II. On his return to Brazil, the Emperor found a disorganized and weakened political environment.

==== Opposition in Brazil ====
For the Portuguese, Pedro I was the heir to the Crown, but for the Brazilians, he should have had no connection with Portugal. Even after abdicating the throne, he faced strong opposition in Brazil. The situation faced by the Emperor ranged from financial difficulties, due to the bankruptcy of the first Bank of Brazil, to personal problems. With an increasingly damaged image, numerous protests against the Empire had emerged in the country.

From 1835 onwards, the idea of anticipating the coming of age of Pedro de Alcântara to began to gain force. The large land and slave owners were skeptical of the process of political-administrative decentralization initiated by the authorities during the Regency period. At the same time, the social revolts that broke out in various provinces demanded some measure to guarantee order and social peace. People believed that only the re-establishment of monarchical authority could contain the excesses of local powers and appease dissent.

=== Regency period ===
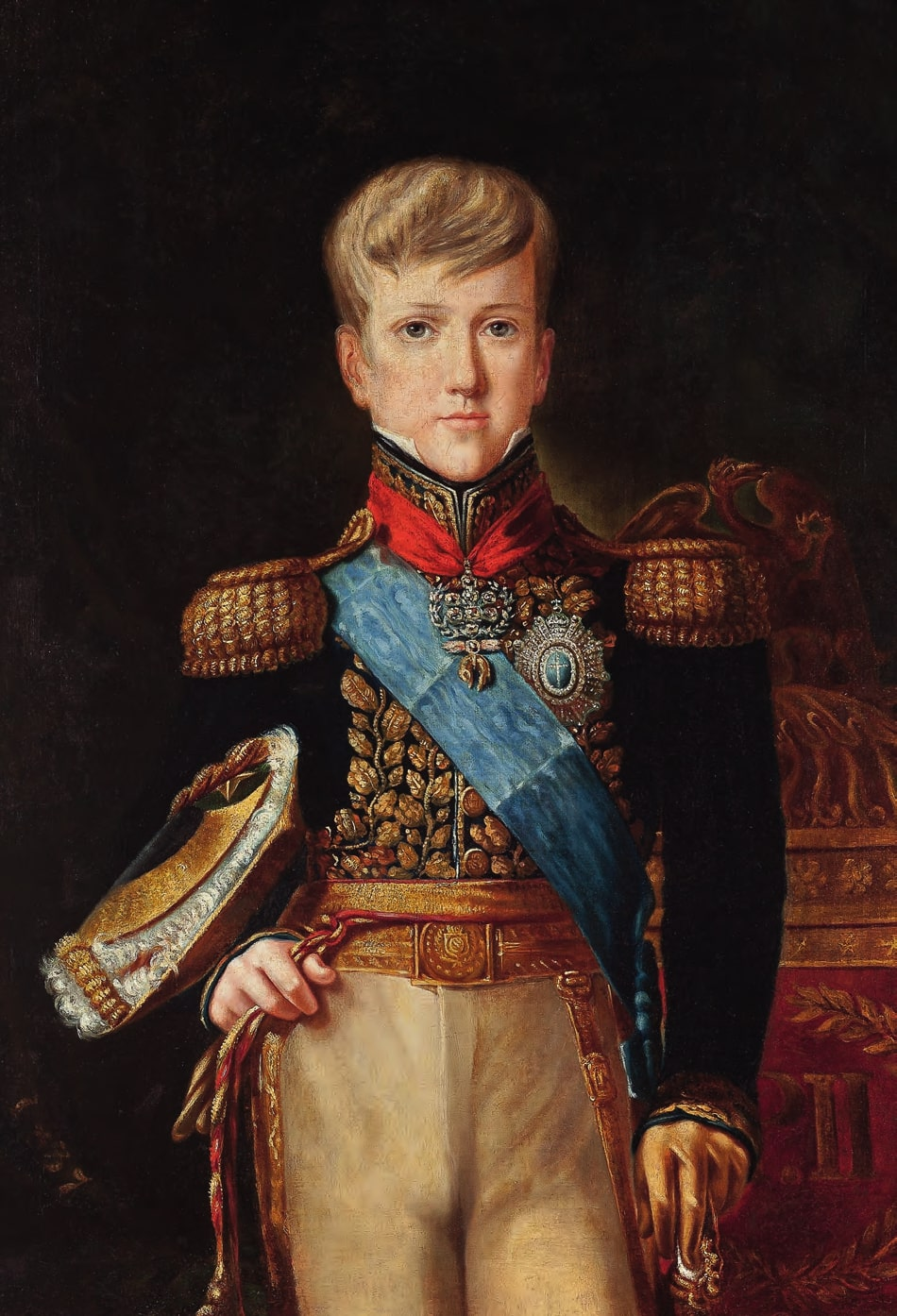
Emperor Pedro II as a teenager wearing the imperial gala uniform, by Félix Émile Taunay, in the Imperial Museum

According to the Constitution of 1824, the age of majority was 21, meaning that Pedro II had to wait a few years before ascending the throne; this waiting period, which lasted from 1831 to 1840, was called the Regency Period. It was characterized by strong crises, decentralization, great party polarity and several revolts. In the meantime, Pedro de Alcântara received advice from José Bonifácio about assuming the throne.

This period also saw the expansion of coffee growing in the Paraíba Valley with the emergence of the coffee barons. In order to develop a cultural policy for the country, the Colégio Pedro II and the Brazilian Historic and Geographic Institute were created.

The Regency Period, which lasted nine years, can be divided into the Provisional Triumviral Regency (1831), the Permanent Triumviral Regency (1831–1835), the Single Regency of Feijó (1835–1837) and the Single Regency of Araújo Lima (1837–1840).

==== Provisional Triumviral Regency (1831) ====
After a meeting between deputies and senators in Rio de Janeiro, the first Regency was created, composed of Francisco de Lima e Silva, Nicolau Vergueiro and José Joaquim Carneiro dos Campos. Among the main measures taken by the new government, an amnesty was decreed for all prisoners convicted or sentenced for political crimes, and a law that set limits on the power of the regents was passed.

==== Permanent Triumviral Regency (1831–1835) ====
Also formed by Francisco de Lima e Silva, the new Regency put the military in power and approved a series of reforms to the Constitution. In November 1832, the Code of Criminal Procedure, the first measure included in the so-called "liberal advance", appeared.

==== Single Regency of Feijó (1835–1837) ====
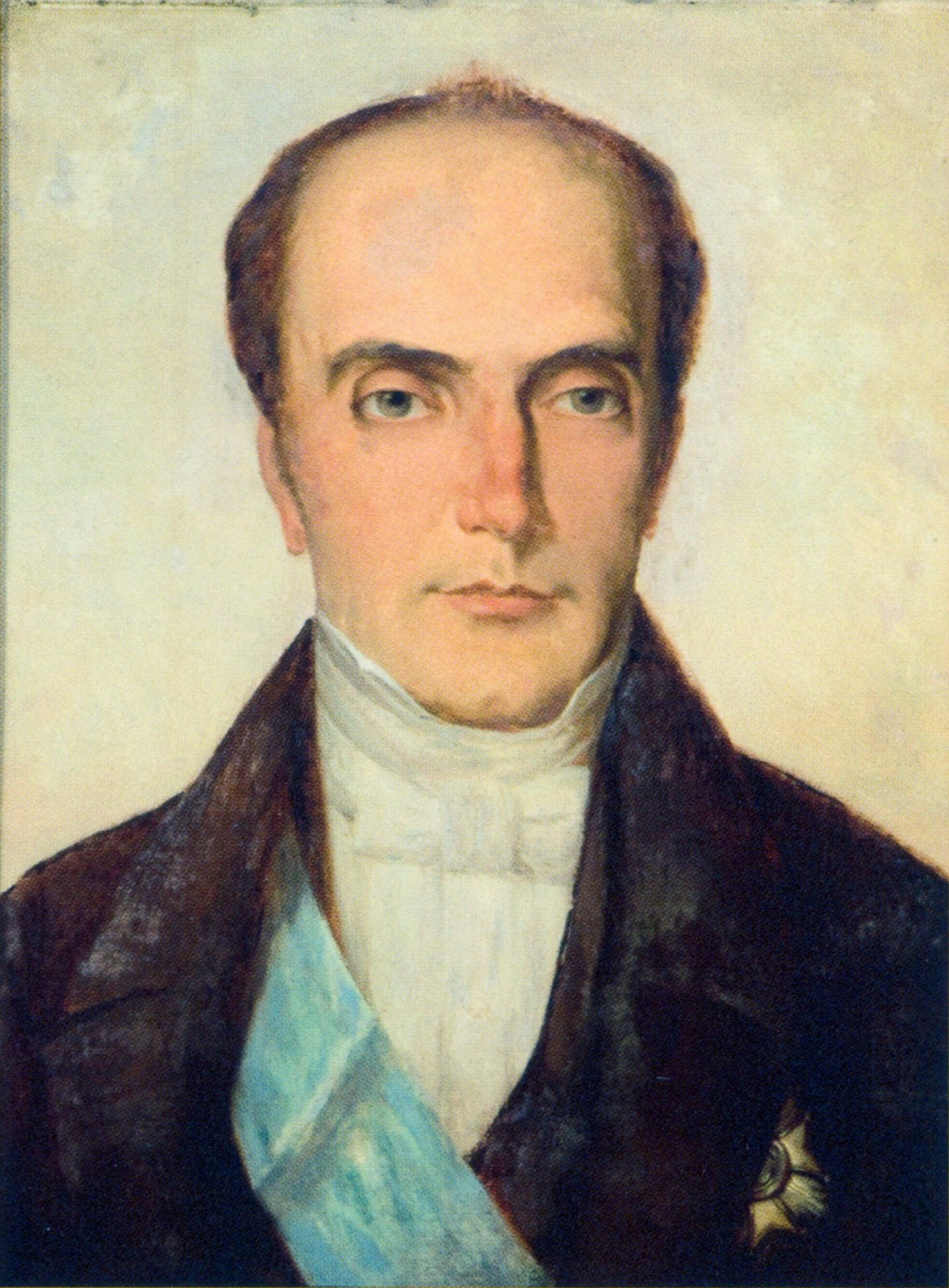
Pedro de Araújo Lima, from Pernambuco, a "calm, thoughtful and tolerant" conservative

As a result of the Additional Act, an election was held to choose the candidate for Single Regent. Among the most prominent candidates were Diogo Antônio Feijó from São Paulo and Antônio Francisco de Paula de Holanda Cavalcanti de Albuquerque from Pernambuco.

With a small difference in votes, Feijó beat Cavalcanti and took office on October 12, 1835. He and his companions created the Progressive Party and, in opposition to it, the Regressist Party was formed, which wanted to repeal the Additional Act.

The Regressist Party gave rise to the Conservative Party, while the other originated the Liberal Party. The period was characterized by political instability, democracy and the project of freedom, and ended with Feijó's resignation on September 19, 1837.

==== Single Regency of Araújo Lima (1837–1840) ====
The second election for Single Regent took place in 1838, in which the then Minister of Justice, Araújo Lima, was elected with a large majority of the votes. As a result, the conservatives were installed in power.

The goal for the party was to restore state authority, strengthen the Executive and eliminate the disorder that was spreading throughout the country. At the same time, Sabinada broke out in Bahia in 1837.

After the Balaiada in Maranhão, politicians felt the need to consolidate their authority and preserve the position of their parties. Afraid of losing political space to their opponents, the conservatives wanted to restore public and private security.

At this point, there was already a lot of popular support for bringing forward the age of majority. The press took part in the movement and leaflets were pasted on walls and scattered around Rio de Janeiro. One of the verses sung in the streets was:

We want Pedro II

Although he has no age.

The nation disregards the law,

And long live the age of majority!

== Accession to the throne de facto ==
=== Campaign for Early Majority ===
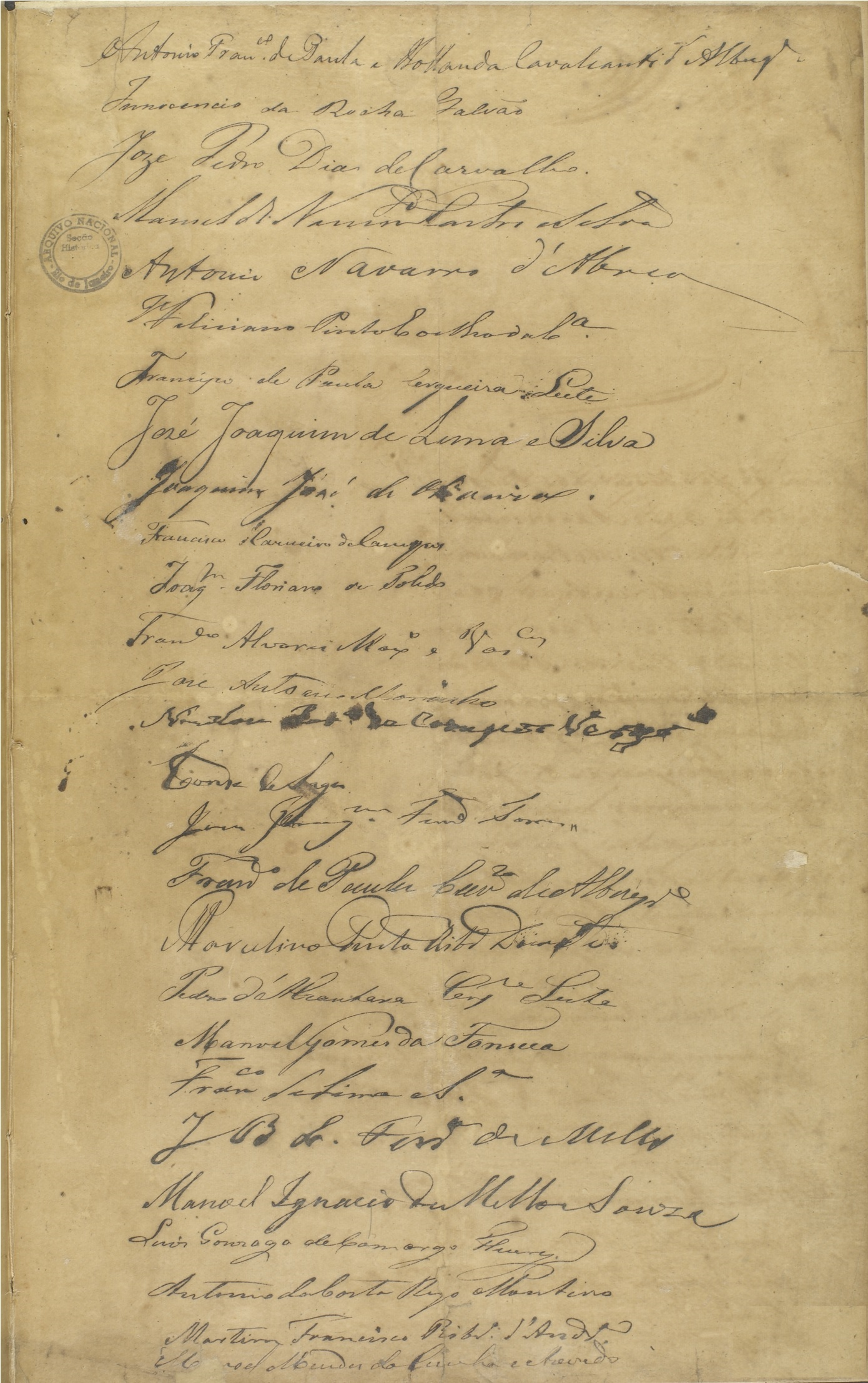
Page of the petition sent by deputies and senators of the Empire questioning the legitimacy of the regent and defending the assumption of the throne by Pedro II, July 22, 1840. National Archives.

Commonly known as Clube da Joana (English: Joana's Club), the conservative groups exerted influence over the royal family and Pedro II. According to them, the disorder was caused by the excesses of freedom due to the Additional Act. In 1840, the Sociedade Promotora da Maioridade (Society for the Promotion of Majority) was created, which was soon renamed the Clube da Maioridade (Majority Club).

The campaign won the Chamber of Deputies and Senate. In addition, there were several popular demonstrations. In order to bring forward the government of Pedro II, the liberal representatives presented the General Assembly with a bill to declare the age of majority. Although the Regency government tried to save time, the deputies formed a committee and asked Pedro II to assume power. After accepting, on July 23, 1840, he was sworn in to the General Assembly.

Brazilians!

The General Legislative Assembly of Brazil, recognizing the happy intellectual development of H.M.I. Pedro II, with whom Divine Providence has favored the Empire of Santa Cruz; recognizing also the evils inherent in exceptional governments, and witnessing the unanimous desire of the people of this capital; convinced that this desire is in agreement with that of the entire Empire, to confer on the same Lord the exercise of the powers that, by the Constitution, are incumbent upon him, it was well, for such weighty reasons, to declare him of age, for the purpose of immediately entering into the full exercise of these powers, as Constitutional Emperor and Perpetual Defender of Brazil.

Brazilians! The nation's hopes have become reality; a new era has dawned, one of unity and prosperity. Let us be worthy of such a great benefit.

On the same date, the Emperor took the oath before the General Assembly, in the following terms:

I swear to uphold the Roman Catholic religion, the integrity and indivisibility of the Empire, to observe and enforce the political Constitution of the Brazilian nation, and the other laws of the Empire, and to provide for the general good of Brazil, as far as I am concerned.

The coronation of the new emperor took place on July 18, 1841, in the city of Rio de Janeiro. The event only ended on July 24.

== Consequences ==
With the anticipation of the government, the Regency was extinguished. The centralization of power in the hands of Pedro II allowed for the political stabilization of the country, focusing attention on the figure of the young Emperor. Among the remaining Regency revolts, the Balaiada ended in 1841 and the Ragamuffin War in 1845.

Subsequently, the Emperor appointed his first Ministry, known as the Ministry of Majority or Ministry of Brothers, composed of the brothers Antônio Carlos and Martim Francisco de Andrada, and the two Cavalcanti brothers, the future Viscounts of Albuquerque and Suassuna.

The Ministry, formed by members of the Liberal Party, was responsible for dissolving the Chamber and calling new polls in 1840. In the election, the supporters of the Ministry of the Majority did not hesitate to use violence to ensure victory, which the conservatives called the "eleições do cacete". Changes were made to the electoral process and polling stations were robbed. Fraud was one of the main features of this election, which not only had its vote count altered, but also accepted non-existent people and allowed IDs to be exchanged when voting.

The Ministry of the Majority was short-lived, mainly due to the worsening of the Ragamuffin War in Southern Brazil, as well as British pressure to end the slave trade. Surprising the country's elites, the Emperor dissolved the liberal Ministry of the Majority and convened a conservative one in 1841. The loss of the liberals laid the foundations for the revolts of 1842, an attempt to seize power by armed struggle. After the defeat, conservative politics were definitively established.

== See also ==
- First Reign
- Second Reign
- Abdication of Pedro I
