= First reign (Empire of Brazil) =

Historical period of Brazil (1822–1831)

First Reign
- 1822–1831
| Kingdom of Brazil | Regency period |
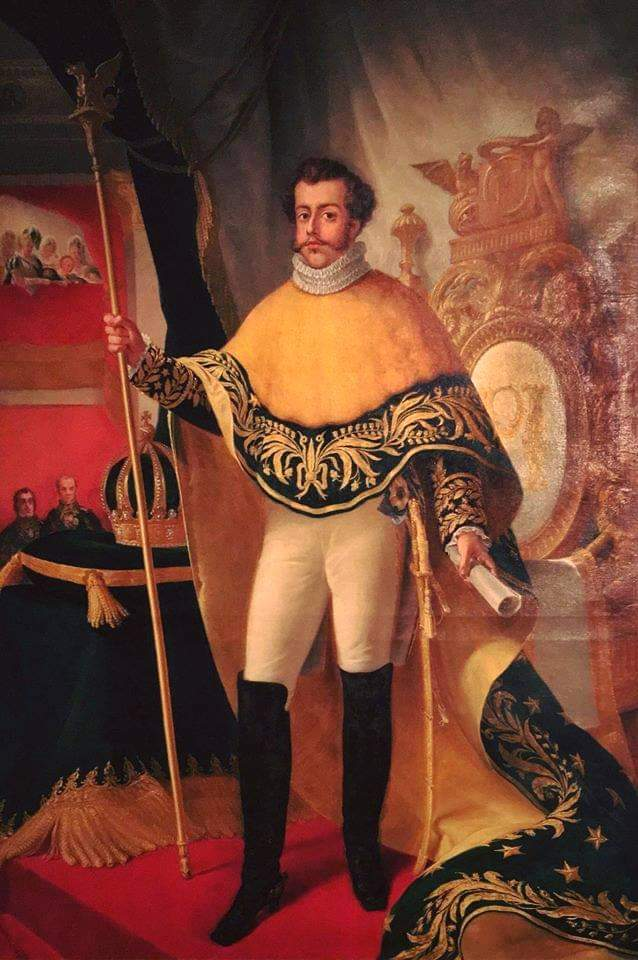
- Emperor Pedro I in his majestic costume with imperial insignia
- Key events: Dia do Fico; Independence of Brazil; Confederation of the Equator; Cisplatine War; Abdication of Pedro I

The First Reign was the period of Brazilian history in which Pedro I ruled Brazil as Emperor. It began on September 7, 1822, when Brazil's independence was proclaimed, and ended on April 7, 1831, when Pedro I abdicated the Brazilian throne.

When Pedro I declared independence, defeating those who were still loyal to Portugal, he achieved great prestige and power. In 1823, he convened the Constituent Assembly which, amid great disagreements between parliamentarians and the Emperor, was dissolved in the Night of Agony. The emperor then convened a Council of State to draft Brazil's first constitution, which was enacted the following year. The document brought centralizing aspects along with the controversial moderating power, which contributed to growing discontent and revolts, including the outcome of the Cisplatine War and the assassination of Líbero Badaró, a well-known journalist. These incidents diminished the emperor's popularity and led to incidents such as a trip to Minas Gerais, where Pedro I was harassed by the locals.

At this point, two of the most important groups supporting the emperor also withdrew their support: the nobility and the army. This made the political situation untenable; confronted, Pedro I found no solution and, in April 1831, abdicated in favor of his son, Pedro de Alcântara, then 5 years old.

This period of transition was marked by a major economic, financial, social and political crisis. It is historically incorrect to refer to this period as the "First Empire", since Brazil had a single continuous imperial period, divided into the First Reign, the Regency Period and the Second Reign.

== Independence of Brazil ==
Independence or Death, by Pedro Américo, oil on canvas, 1888.

After Napoleon Bonaparte declared war on England's allies, he ordered an invasion of Portugal, which had refused to comply with the French demands regarding the continental blockade. For this reason, the British crown financed the arrival of the Portuguese Royal Family in Rio de Janeiro in 1808. After a few years living in the colony, John VI became king of the country, founding the United Kingdom of Portugal, Brazil and the Algarves on December 16, 1815; Rio de Janeiro was named the capital of the United Kingdom.

Under this new political status, Brazil experienced some conditions not seen before, such as the installation of some small industries in Rio de Janeiro and trade with countries other than Portugal. One of these countries was England, which benefited greatly from the political change, since it wouldn't have to wait for Brazilian products (raw materials, gold, minerals) to pass through Portugal first. For helping the Portuguese crown, the British signed two treaties with them, the Strangford Treaty (1810) and the Treaty of Alliance and Friendship (1810), which established the payment of only 15% in taxes, while the Portuguese paid 16% and the rest of the European countries 24%.

=== Liberal Revolution of 1820 ===
In 1820, the Portuguese population demanded the return of King John VI to Lisbon, as Napoleon had already been deposed in France. On August 24 of the same year, the Liberal Revolution broke out, first in the city of Porto and then in other Portuguese metropolises. Despite managing to postpone it for a few months, John VI was forced to return to Lisbon in 1822.

=== Beberibe Convention ===
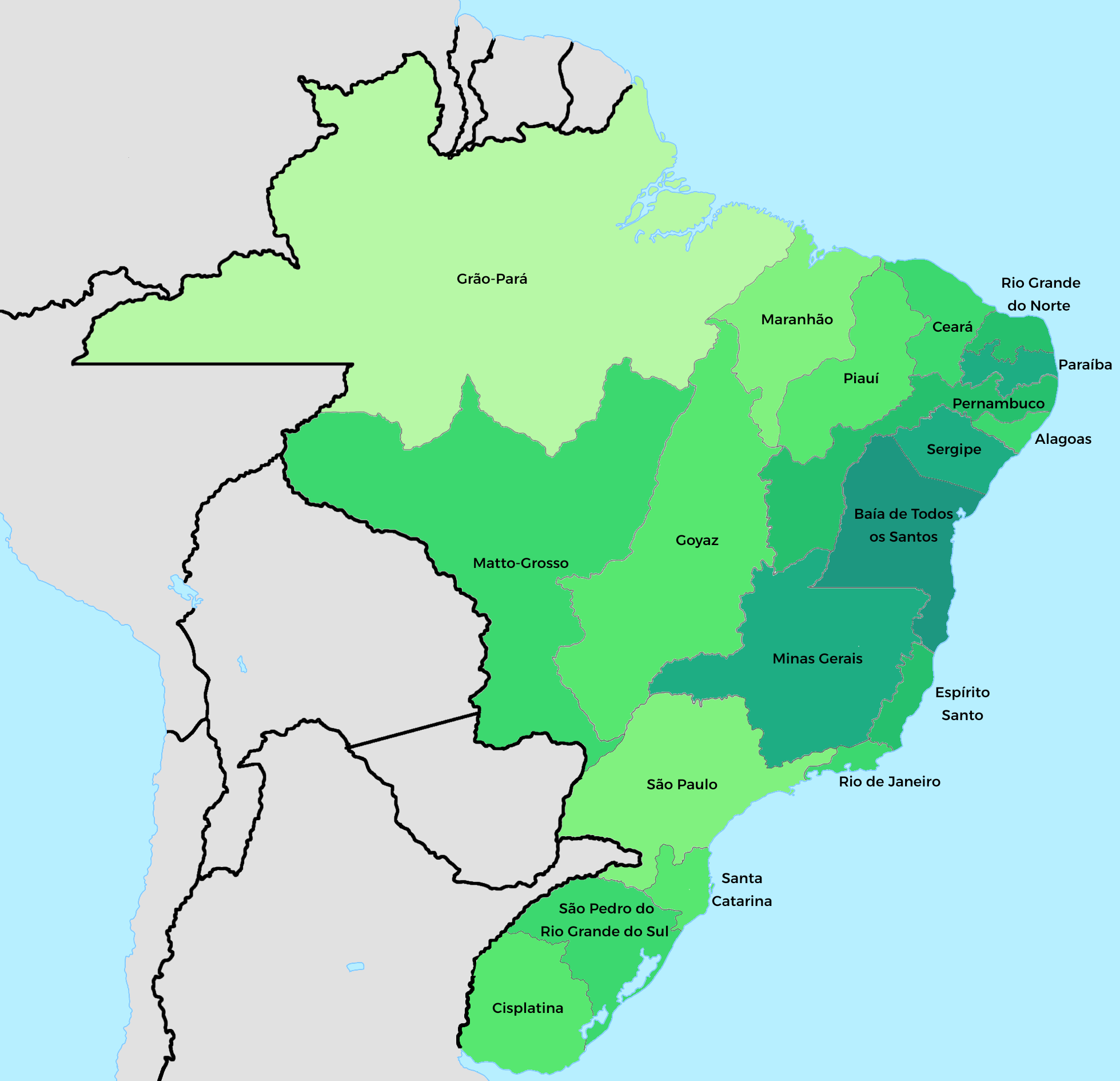
Brazilian provinces at the time of independence.

Pernambuco was the first Brazilian province to secede from the Kingdom of Portugal, eleven months before the proclamation of Brazil's independence. On August 29, 1821, an armed movement began against the government of Captain General Luís do Rego Barreto – the leader of the Pernambucan revolt – culminating in the formation of the Junta de Goiana. On October 5, the Portuguese troops surrendered and were expelled from Pernambuco in a movement known as the Beberibe Convention, considered to be the first episode of Brazilian independence.

=== Dia do Fico ===
Pedro I refused to go to Portugal and remained in Brazil. On January 9, 1822, he pronounced the famous phrase: "If it is for the good of all and the general happiness of the nation, it is declared: tell the people that I stay". John VI was forced to swear an oath to the constitution and reinstate Brazil's status as a colony. In order to reverse the situation, the Brazilian people obtained around 9,000 signatures and convinced Pedro I to proclaim the Independence of Brazil on September 7, 1822.

=== Wars of independence ===
Pedro, now Emperor Pedro I, sought to remove possible centers of Portuguese resistance within Brazilian territory. He encountered strong opposition in the provinces of Maranhão, Bahia, Pará and Piauí, not to mention Portuguese troops who were still installed in Rio de Janeiro and other Brazilian cities. To solve the situation, Pedro I hired some European soldiers, mostly English and French, who, under the command of British Marshal Thomas Cochrane, managed to remove the enemy forces; in Maranhão, he succeeded in dissipating the resistance with just one warship.

By defeating the opposition in mid-1823, Pedro I consolidated his leadership. His first major political act was to convene the Constituent Assembly, which was elected in early 1823. This was also its first failure; due to a strong disagreement between the deputies and the Emperor, who demanded more personal power than the legislature and the judiciary, the Assembly was dissolved in November.

== First reign of Brazil ==
Flag of the Empire of Brazil.

=== Imperial Constitution ===
==== Constituent Assembly of 1823 ====
On March 3, 1823, the General Constituent and Legislative Assembly of the Empire of Brazil began its activities with the objective of creating the country's first political constitution. On the same day, Pedro I delivered a speech to the assembled deputies, stating that the constitution should be worthy of Brazil and of himself (a phrase that was José Bonifácio's idea, not the Emperor's):

As Constitutional Emperor, and especially as Perpetual Defender of this Empire, I said to the people on December 1st of last year, when I was crowned and consecrated – that with my sword I would defend the Homeland, the Nation and the Constitution, if it were worthy of Brazil and of me... a constitution in which the three powers are well divided... a constitution which, by putting up inaccessible barriers to despotism, whether royal, aristocratic or democratic, will chase away anarchy and plant the tree of liberty under whose shade the union, tranquillity and independence of this Empire must grow, which will be the wonder of the new and old world. All the constitutions which, in the style of 1791 and 1792, have laid their foundations and wanted to be organized, have shown us are totally theoretical and metaphysical, and therefore unworkable: this is proven by France, Spain and, lately, Portugal. They have not brought about general happiness as they should have done, but rather, after a licentious freedom, we see that in some countries despotism is already appearing, and in others it will soon appear, in one, after having been exercised by many, with the necessary consequence that the peoples are reduced to the sad situation of witnessing and suffering all the horrors of anarchy.

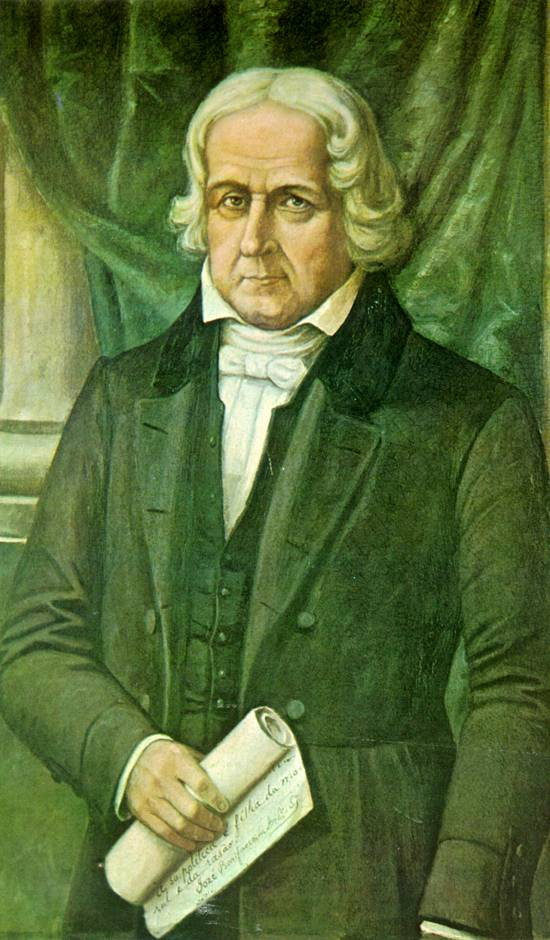
José Bonifácio was the leader of one of the groups in the Constituent Assembly of 1823.

In his speech, Pedro I pointed out to the deputies that the constitution should prevent possible abuses, not only by the monarch, but also by the political class and the population itself. To this end, it would be important to avoid creating laws that would be violated in practice. At first, the Assembly was ready to accept the Emperor's request, but some deputies felt uncomfortable with Pedro's speech. One of them, Andrade de Lima, a representative from Pernambuco, expressed his discontent, claiming that Pedro's words were too ambiguous. The majority of the deputies in the Constituent Assembly were moderate liberals, gathering together "what was best and most representative in Brazil". They were elected indirectly, by census vote and did not belong to parties, which did not yet exist in the country.

However, there were political divisions and three groups were distinguishable: the "bonifacios", who were led by José Bonifácio, defended the existence of a strong, but constitutional and centralized monarchy, in order to avoid the possibility of the fragmentation of the country, wanted to abolish the slave trade and slavery, carry out agrarian reform and develop the country economically free of foreign loans; the "portugueses absolutistas" ("absolutist Portuguese"), who included not only Lusitanians but also Brazilians and defended an absolute and centralized monarchy, as well as the preservation of their economic and social privileges; and the "liberais federalistas" ("federalist liberals"), who included Portuguese and Brazilians and advocated a merely figurative and decentralized monarchy, if possible federal, together with the maintenance of slavery, as well as strongly opposing the projects of the "bonifacios". Ideologically, the Emperor identified with the "bonifacios", since he had no interest either in acting as an absolute monarch or in serving as "a cardboard figure in government".

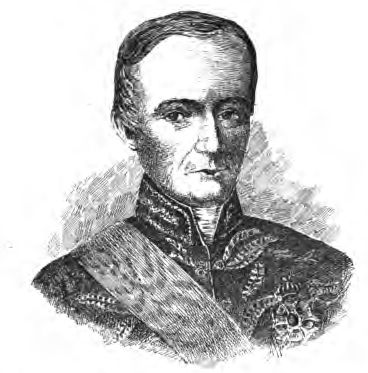
Andrada Machado e Silva, José Bonifácio's brother, was the author of the first draft of a Brazilian constitution, after being freed from prison for his participation in the Pernambucan revolt.

The draft of the 1823 constitution was written by Andrada Machado, under the strong influence of the French and Norwegian constitutions, and sent to the Constituent Assembly, where the deputies began work on the document. There were several differences between the project of 1823 and the official text of 1824. In terms of federalism, it was centralizing, as it divided the country into comarcas, which are judicial and not administrative divisions. In addition, the electoral qualifications were much more restrictive than in the 1824 Constitution. The draft also stated that only free men in Brazil would be considered Brazilian citizens, and not slaves who might be freed, unlike the promulgated document. The separation of the three powers was planned, with the executive being under the authority of the Emperor, but the responsibility for his actions resting with the ministers of state. The Constituent Assembly also included the Emperor's veto (maintained in the final document), who could even veto the draft constitution if he so decided. However, political changes led the deputies to propose making the monarch a symbol completely subordinate to the Assembly. This fact, followed by the approval of a bill on June 12, 1823, which stated that the laws created by the organization would not have to be sanctioned by the Emperor, led Pedro I to confront the Constituent Assembly.

On one hand, the "liberais federalistas" wanted to overthrow the ministry presided over by José Bonifácio and get revenge for the persecutions they had suffered during the previous year. On the other hand, the "portugueses absolutistas" saw their interests threatened when José Bonifácio issued the decrees of November 12, 1822, and December 11, 1822, which eliminated the privileges of the Lusitanians and confiscated the goods, merchandise and property belonging to those who had supported Portugal during Brazilian independence, respectively. Despite their differences, the "portugueses" and the "liberais" allied with the purpose of removing their common enemy from power. They recruited the:

[...] disaffected by the Andradas, whose reputation with the Emperor stimulated a lot of envy and whose arrogance, sometimes rude, stirred up a lot of feelings and hurt a lot of vanities. Harsh towards their opponents, the Andradas had made plenty of enemies out of the prestige earned by their intellectual superiority and honesty. The disaffected joined forces to overthrow them, and in the alliance, moderates were mixed up with the exalted.

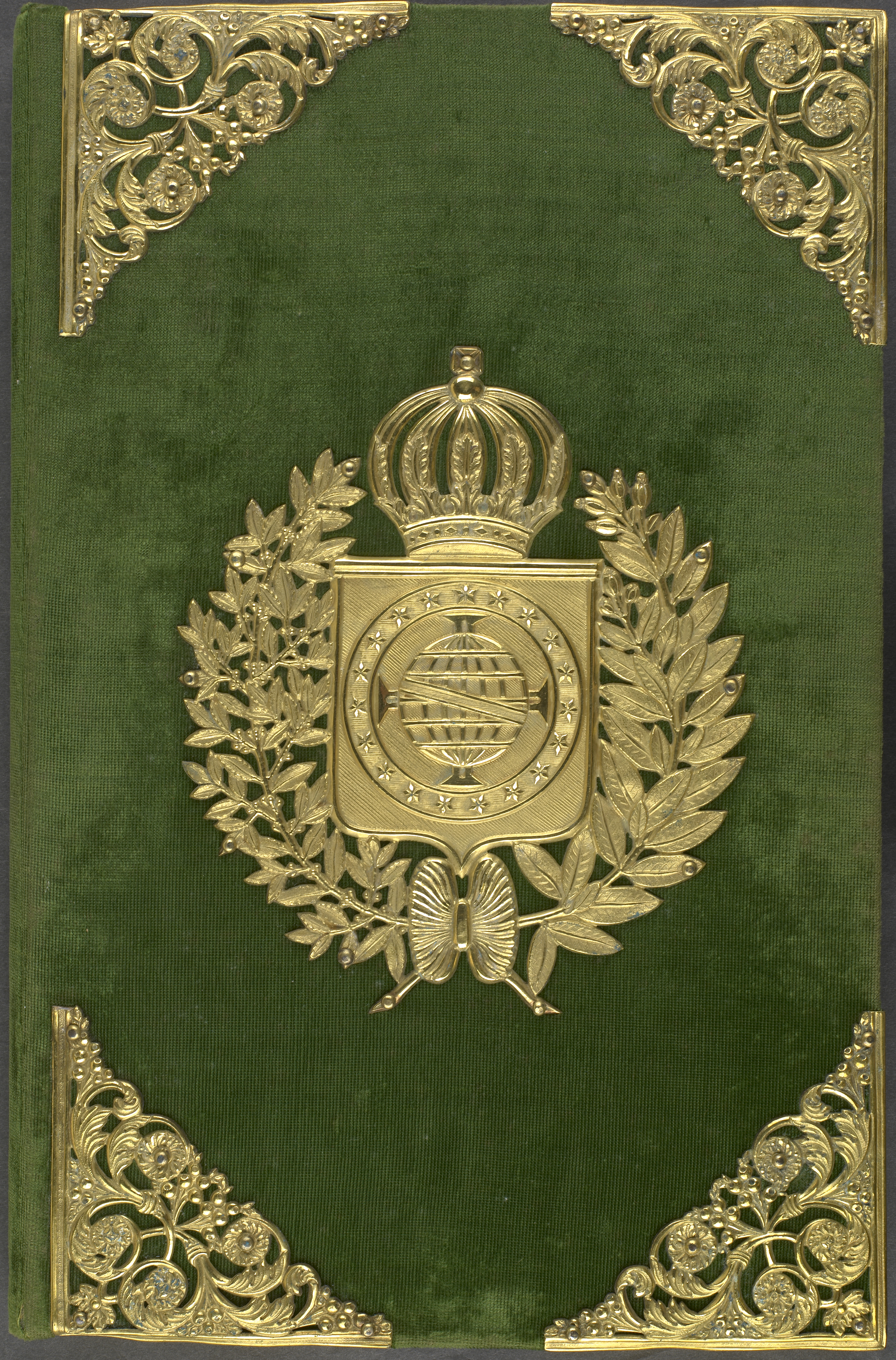
1824 Constitution. Document held by the Brazilian National Archives.

The two allied groups mobilized the Emperor's close friends to their side, who soon tried to damage Pedro's relationship with José Bonifácio. Seeing most of the assembly openly displeased with the Andrada ministry and influenced by his friends, who identified with the interests of the "portugueses", Pedro I removed the ministers. A battle broke out between the country's newspapers that defended different groups. The alliance between the "liberais" and the "portugueses" was short-lived; as soon as the Andrada ministry was dismissed, the two groups turned against each other. For the Emperor, any relationship with the "liberais" would be unacceptable, as he knew of their intentions to turn him into a merely decorative figure. The attacks on the Portuguese and Pedro I by newspapers and deputies in favor of the Andradas led the Emperor to get closer to the "portugueses".

The crisis became worse when a Brazilian-born apothecary, who also worked as a journalist, was physically attacked by two Portuguese officers who mistakenly believed he had written an insulting article. The Andradas took the opportunity to claim that the aggression was an attack on the honor of Brazil and the Brazilian people. Antônio Carlos de Andrada and Martim Francisco de Andrada were carried away on the shoulders of a crowd and a wave of anti-Lusitanian xenophobia intensified tensions. Pedro I watched the demonstration from the window of the Imperial Palace and ordered the army to prepare for a conflict. The deputies were apprehensive and required answers regarding the reason for the gathering of troops in São Cristóvão. The Minister of the Empire, Vilela Barbosa, representing the government, addressed the Assembly demanding that the Andradas brothers be prosecuted for the alleged abuses they had committed. The assembled deputies debated the government's proposal and remained in session until the early hours of the morning. The following day, when Vilela Barbosa returned to the assembly to explain the meeting of the troops, some deputies shouted demanding that Pedro I be declared an "outlaw". About the episode, Oliveira Lima stated that:

The dawn of the "night of agony" did not illuminate any martyrdom. The deputies who had declared themselves ready to fall to the imperial bayonets returned quietly to their homes, without the soldiers bothering them. Only six were deported to France, including the three Andradas.

The Portuguese proposed to Pedro I that he send the Andradas brothers to Portugal, where they would probably be condemned to death for their part in the independence of Brazil. "No! I don't consent because it's perfidy [disloyalty]," replied the Emperor. Worried about the possibility of becoming a null figure in the country's government and faced with disputes among the deputies, Pedro I decided to dissolve the Constituent Assembly.

==== Establishment of the 1824 Constitution ====
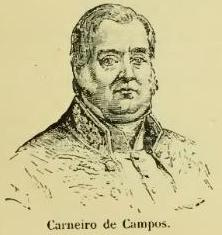
José Joaquim Carneiro de Campos, the main author of the new constitution.

After dissolving the Constituent Assembly, the Emperor commissioned the Council of State, created on November 13, 1823, and composed of renowned Brazilian jurists, to draft a new constitution. The group included Carneiro de Campos, Villela Barbosa, Maciel da Costa, Nogueira da Gama, Carvalho e Mello, among others. The Council of State used the 1823 draft as a basis and after finishing it, dispatched a copy of the new document to all the municipal councils in the expectation that it would serve as a blueprint for a new Constituent Assembly. However, the councillors, elected by the Brazilian people as their representatives, suggested to the Emperor that the draft be officially adopted as the official document and voted in favor of its approval as the constitution. On March 25, 1824, the first Brazilian Constitution, influenced by the French Constitution of 1791 and the Spanish Constitution of 1812, was granted by Pedro I and solemnly sworn in at the Cathedral of the Empire.

The text was a "beautiful document of French-style liberalism", with a system based on the theory of national sovereignty. The form of government was monarchical, hereditary, constitutional and representative; the country was formally divided into provinces and political power was split into four, according to the liberal philosophy of the separation of powers theories and Benjamin Constant.

The 1824 Constitution was one of the most liberal that existed at the time, even surpassing European ones. Although it provided for the possibility of religious freedom only in the domestic sphere, in practice it was total. Protestants, Jews and followers of other faiths were allowed to keep their religious temples with freedom of worship. It also contained the moderating power, whose creation was attributed to Martim Francisco de Andrada, a great admirer of Benjamin Constant. This power would serve to "resolve impasses and ensure the functioning of the government". The separation of the executive and moderating powers emerged from the practice of the British monarchical-parliamentary system.

The document contained "some of the best possibilities of the liberal revolution that was sweeping the West – those that would come to fruition, albeit imperfectly, during the reign of Pedro II". Isabel Lustosa says that according to [Neill] Macaulay, "he provided an unusual statute, under which Brazil protected for more than 65 years the basic rights of its citizens better 'than any other nation in the Western Hemisphere, with the possible exception of the United States'." According to João de Scantimburgo:

Pedro I and his constituents had the good sense to choose the best regime for the tropical nation, which was establishing itself in America, without copying the already consolidated United States, and the Spanish-American nations that had been retaliated by endless stumbles, by the relay of brief democratic periods and caudillesque dictatorships

=== Political and electoral structure in the Empire ===
The 1824 Constitution established the first rules for the Brazilian electoral system. The General Assembly, highest body of the national legislature, was created, composed of the Senate and the Chamber of Deputies, whose members were chosen by popular vote.

Before the reform of 1881, elections were indirect. There were two levels of voting; in the first stage, exercised by parish electors, citizens who were at least 25 years old and had an annual income of 100,000 réis voted, and in the second stage, electors were chosen. These, also known as provincial electors, elected the deputies. Senators were elected by the Emperor. Voting was not compulsory, but was defined according to their economic means, restricting the electorate to the wealthiest citizens. Salaried workers in general, soldiers, women, indigenous people and those under the age of 25 were excluded from national political life. At the end of the Empire, only 1.5% of the Brazilian population had the right to vote.

Another important characteristic of the Brazilian electoral system during the Empire was the relationship between the state and religion, the so-called padroado. Catholicism, declared the official religion of Brazil, had a strong influence on national political relations, which was reflected in the legal requirement for candidates for political office to follow Catholicism, as well as the conduct of elections within churches. At that time, a good percentage of the politicians elected in Brazil were of sacerdotal origin, since the recruitment of electors and the organization of the polls were carried out by priests. Clergymen received income from the Empire, making them equivalent to civil servants. All decisions made by the Church had to be approved by the Emperor.

== Decline and end of the First Reign ==
=== Confederation of the Equator and Cisplatine War ===
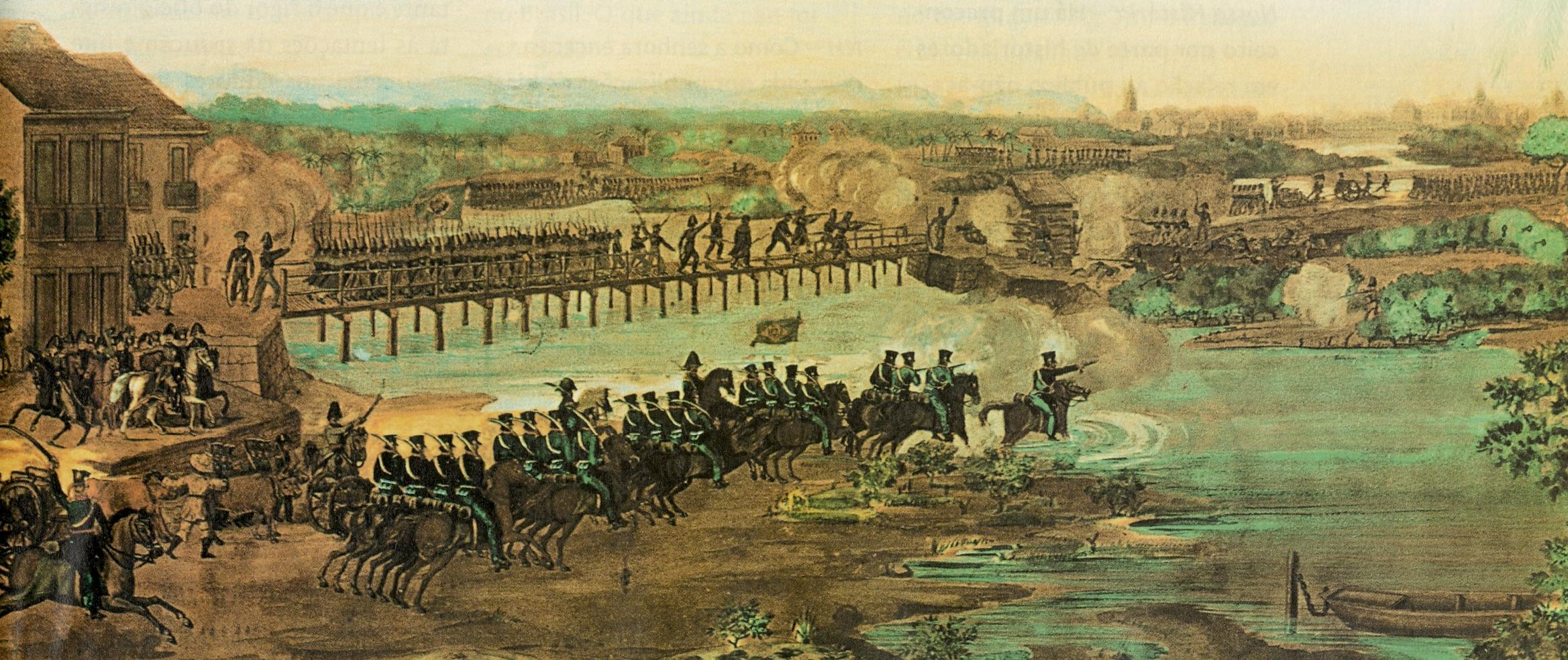
The army of the Brazilian Empire attacks the Confederate forces in Recife in 1824, during the Confederation of the Equator.

The political forces of the northeastern provinces, led by Pernambuco, rebelled against the government and the constitution, claiming that it gave too many powers to the sovereign. They preached a republic with Recife as its capital, which would be called the Confederation of the Equator. The movement was repressed with extreme violence by the imperial troops. Although the 1824 Constitution stipulated that the regime in force was liberal, Pedro I imposed his will firmly, creating a conflict with the liberals who began to identify him as a dictatorial and authoritarian ruler.

Another important event of the First Reign was the Cisplatine War, when Uruguayans, supported by the Argentine government, occupied the entire Cisplatine Province and incorporated it into the Republic of the United Provinces of the River Plate. As a result, the Cisplatine Province lost its independence under the name of the Oriental Republic of Uruguay, which intensified Pedro I's problems and worsened the economic crisis generated by the restoration of sugar exports and production by the Spanish colonies with their recent independence.

The excessive issuance of paper money with the purpose of covering the deficits caused by the defeat in the Cisplatine War also caused dissatisfaction, as it led to inflation and reduced the purchasing power of the poorer sections of the population. There was also the outflow of monetary reserves, previously deposited in the Bank of Brazil, taken to Portugal on the return of King John VI.

=== Abdication of the Portuguese throne ===
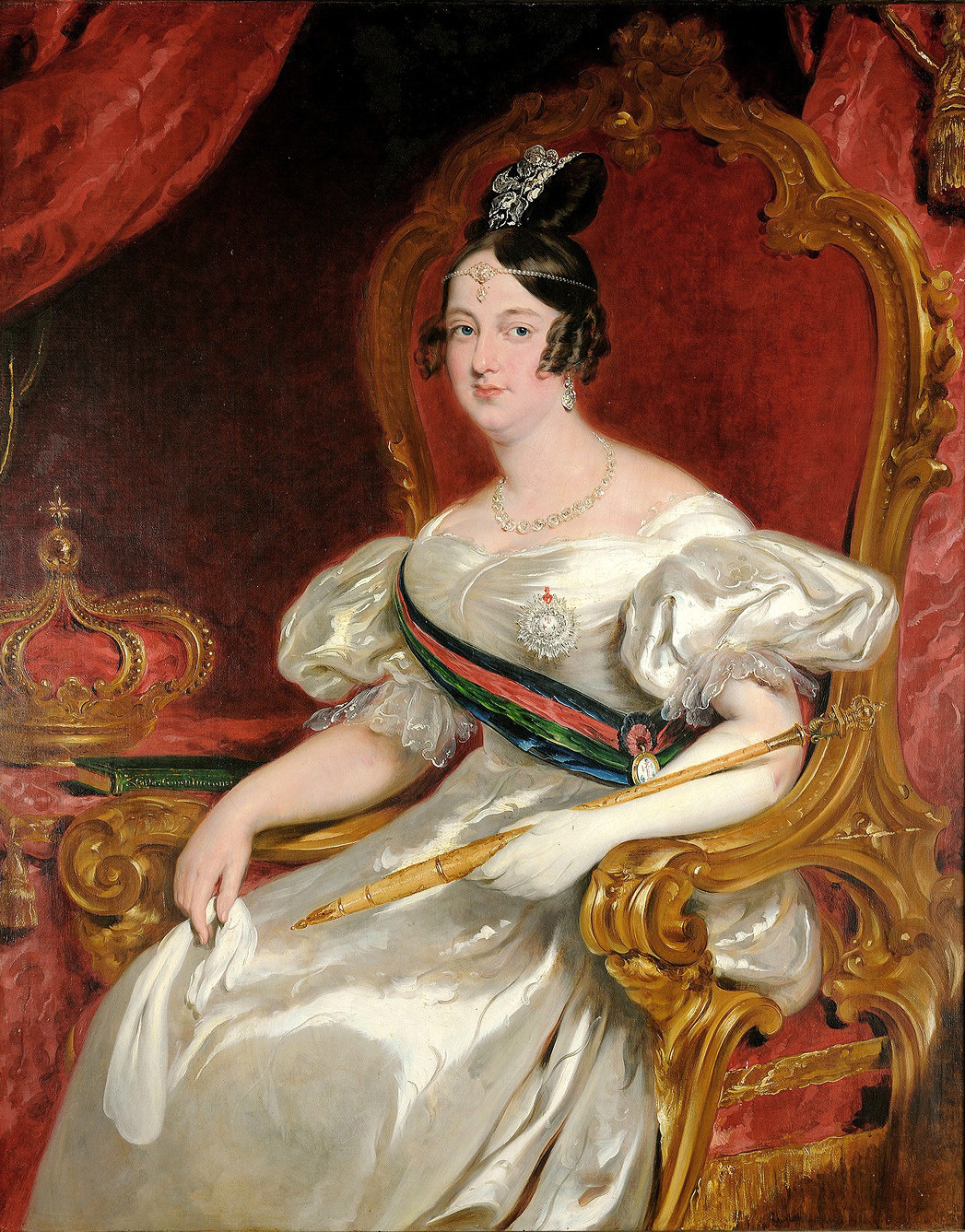
In 1826, Pedro I abdicated the Portuguese throne in favor of his daughter, Maria II, and returned to Portugal.

In line with the policy of the Portuguese constitution and taking advantage of Brazil's fragility after the Cisplatine War, King John VI and the absolutist group of his ministry sought to reclaim Brazilian territory in mid-1825. On the verge of war, John VI decided to appoint Pedro as his successor in Portugal, ignoring the desertion that he had imposed on his son due to his rebellion and the events of 1822 – a negotiation that was monitored from a distance by the British government. In May 1826, Pedro I accepted the proposal and returned to his home country to finally become Pedro IV of Portugal, after his father's abdication. However, because of the Brazilian constitution, Pedro I was forbidden to hold the title of Regent of Portugal and Emperor of Brazil at the same time. Just a month after being crowned Portuguese king, Pedro I abdicated the throne, but guaranteed the succession to his firstborn, Maria II, who was unable to assume it at the time due to her age and handed over the regency to Miguel I. He proclaimed himself king instead of the Brazilian Emperor's daughter. All these problems led to the successive replacement of ministers on March 13 and 14, 1831. Pedro returned to Brazil, where he faced an increasingly unfavorable political situation.

=== Crisis ===
After his father's death, Pedro I became increasingly involved in the question of succession in Portugal. For the Portuguese, he was the heir to the Crown; for the Brazilians, the Emperor should have no connection to the former metropolis because, by proclaiming Independence, he had renounced the Lusitanian inheritance. Later, the emperor formalized his abdication and resigned the throne of Portugal in favor of his eldest daughter, Maria da Glória.

Even though he had resigned, the Brazilian liberal opposition continued to put pressure on him, especially in view of the Emperor's foreign involvement in the problems arising from this succession. The situation worsened with the loss of the Cisplatine Province.

Internally, the Emperor was faced with several problems, such as the financial difficulties arising from the bankruptcy of the first Bank of Brazil (1829), inflation caused by food prices, the Emperor's family situation after the death of his first wife, Empress Dª. Maria Leopoldina (1826), due to his involvement with her lover, the Marchioness of Santos, the murder of journalist Líbero Badaró in São Paulo (1830), executed by police officers linked to the Empire (Pedro I was blamed for the death), and the constant support requested by Pedro from the bureaucrats and military of the Portuguese sector, creating conflicts between Portuguese and Brazilians. With his reputation increasingly damaged in the eyes of Brazilian public opinion, protests were violently repressed.

== Abdication of the Brazilian throne ==
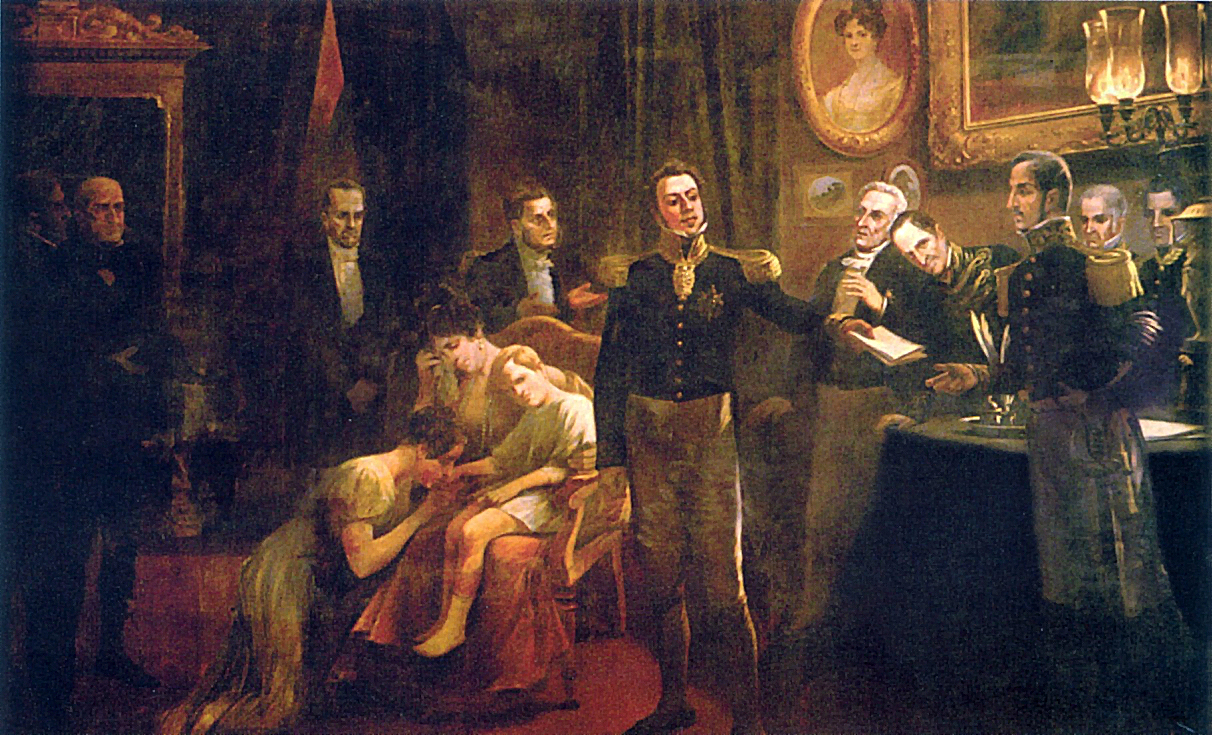
Pedro I delivers his letter of abdication to Major Frias.

In an attempt to restore his political prestige, Pedro I made one last visit to Minas Gerais with the intention of reaching an agreement with the province's politicians. However, he was greeted with a cold reception as there were sectors of the local elite who linked him to the murder of Libero Badaró.

Seeking to reconcile his government with public opinion, Pedro I appointed a new ministry with people accepted by the liberals. However, the opposition did not accept this tactic and continued to pressure him. The ministry that had been formed was dismissed and a new one was formed with Portuguese of absolutist tendencies. The Brazilian soldiers were quartered in the São Cristóvão neighborhood and the people reacted by forming an opposition, culminating in the siege of the Imperial Palace by the population. There was no resistance, as this could lead to civil war.

Outraged, the Portuguese settled in Rio de Janeiro held a public demonstration in protest, which triggered retaliation from the anti-Portuguese sectors, with riots and street conflicts. Enraged, the Emperor promised punishment, but he lacked political support. On April 7, 1831, Pedro I renounced the Empire, leaving the country in the hands of his firstborn, Pedro II, who was five years old; he appointed José Bonifácio de Andrada e Silva as guardian of his younger children and left for Portugal.

Pedro I died in Sintra in 1834, after having taken part in the Portuguese Liberal Wars, where he fought on behalf of his daughter, Maria II, whose Portuguese throne had been usurped by her uncle, Miguel I.

== See also ==
- Second Reign
- Regency Period
- Declaration of age of Pedro II
