= List of shipwrecks in October 1829 =

The list of shipwrecks in October 1829 includes some ships sunk, wrecked or otherwise lost during October 1829.

== 1 October ==
List of shipwrecks: 1 October 1829
Ship	State	Description
Frederickton	(United Kingdom of Great Britain and Ireland) British North America	The ship was wrecked on Brier Island, Nova Scotia. She was on a voyage from Saint John, New Brunswick to Saint Kitts.

== 2 October ==
List of shipwrecks: 2 October 1829
Ship	State	Description
Milford	United Kingdom	The ship was driven ashore and wrecked at Aberthaw, Glamorgan. She was on a voyage from Milford Haven, Pembrokeshire to Bristol, Gloucestershire.

== 3 October ==
List of shipwrecks: 3 October 1829
Ship	State	Description
Blessing	United Kingdom	The ship was wrecked at the mouth of the Seine. Her crew were rescued. She was on a voyage from Newcastle upon Tyne, Northumberland to Caen, Seine-Inférieure, France.
Milo	United Kingdom	The ship was wrecked on the Ecrihou Rock, 6 nautical miles (11 km) off Jersey, Channel Islands. Her crew were rescued. She was on a voyage from Dublin to Memel, Prussia.

== 4 October ==
List of shipwrecks: 4 October 1829
Ship	State	Description
Marquis of Donegal	United Kingdom	The ship was wrecked on Prince Edward Island, British North America. She was on a voyage from Belfast, County Antrim to Pictou, Nova Scotia, British North America.

== 6 October ==
List of shipwrecks: 6 October 1829
Ship	State	Description
Ricon	United Kingdom	The ship sank in the River Mersey. Her crew were rescued.
No. 4 (Note: Listed as No. 3 by Chernyshev.)	Imperial Russian Navy	Russo-Turkish War: The transport ship, a prize captured from the Ottomans, was lost in a storm in the Black Sea. She was on a voyage from Sozopol, Ottoman Empire to Nikolayev. No further trace, presumed foundered with the loss of all hands.

== 7 October ==
List of shipwrecks: 7 October 1829
Ship	State	Description
Jane	United Kingdom	The ship foundered off Groom's Point. She was on a voyage from Ayr to Belfast, County Down.
Jean	United Kingdom	The sloop foundered in the Irish Sea off Bangor, County Down with the loss of all five of her crew. She was on a voyage from Ayr to Belfast, County Antrim.
Jessie	United Kingdom	The ship was wrecked at "Cape d'Aguailles" with the loss of at least fifteen lives. She was on a voyage from Table Bay to Algoa Bay.
Union	Netherlands	The ship was driven ashore at Katwijk, North Holland. Her crew were rescued. She was on a voyage from Riga, Russia to Antwerp.

== 8 October ==
List of shipwrecks: 8 October 1829
Ship	State	Description
Arethusa	United Kingdom	The ship was abandoned in the North Sea off Great Yarmouth, Norfolk. She was on a voyage from Newcastle upon Tyne, Northumberland to Rio de Janeiro, Brazil.
George Alexander	United Kingdom	The ship was wrecked on the Herd Sand, in the North Sea off North Shields, County Durham. Her crew were rescued by the North Shields Lifeboat.
Hoffnung	Prussia	The ship foundered in the North Sea off Hook of Holland, South Holland, Netherlands with the loss of two of her crew.
Mars	United Kingdom	The ship was driven ashore and wrecked at Ilfracombe, Devon. Her crew were rescued. She was on a voyage from Newport, Monmouthshire to Bideford, Devon.
Rosina	United Kingdom	The ship struck the Flemish Banks, in the North Sea and was abandoned. She was towed into Dunkerque, Nord, France, where she sank. Rosina was on a voyage from Plymouth, Devon to Sunderland, County Durham.

== 9 October ==
List of shipwrecks: 9 October 1829
Ship	State	Description
Alfred	United Kingdom	The schooner was lost in the North Sea off Terschelling, Friesland, Netherlands.
Anna Charlotta	(Denmark) Duchy of Holstein	The ship foundered in the North Sea. Her crew survived. She was on a voyage from Tönning to Hull, Yorkshire, United Kingdom.
Casimir Delavigne	France	The ship was driven ashore and wrecked. She was on a voyage from Saint Petersburg, Russia to Havre de Grâce, Seine-Inférieure.
Frau Catherina	(Denmark) Duchy of Holstein	The ship was wrecked off Terschelling. Her crew were rescued. She was on a voyage from Neustadt in Holstein to Hull.
Friendship	United Kingdom	The ship was wrecked on Biorka Island. She was on a voyage from Hull to Saint Petersburg, Russia.
Governor Fenner	United States	The ship was abandoned in the Atlantic Ocean (42°00′N 52°00′W). She was on a voyage from Richmond, Virginia to Liverpool, Lancashire, United Kingdom.
Haabet	Norway	The ship was wrecked off Terschelling. Her crew were rescued. She was on a voyage from Kragerø to Ghent, East Flanders, Netherlands.
Heroine	United Kingdom	The ship was wrecked south of Bic, Lower Canada, British North America. All on board survived.
Isabella and Margaret	United Kingdom	The ship was abandoned in the North Sea off the Dogger Bank. Her crew were rescued by Glory (United Kingdom). Isabella and Margaret was on a voyage from Danzig, Prussia to Newcastle upon Tyne, Northumberland.
Jong Pieter	Netherlands	The ship was wrecked near Dunkerque, Nord, France. She was on a voyage from Newcastle upon Tyne to Nantes, Loire-Inférieure, France.
Maria	France	The ship was driven ashore and wrecked. She was on a voyage from Havre de Grâce to Schiedam, South Holland, Netherlands.
Susannah	United Kingdom	The ship foundered in the North Sea 100 nautical miles (190 km) off Domesnes, Norway. Her crew were rescued by Docterdobbs (Sweden). She was on a voyage from Riga, Russia to Leith, Lothian.
Urania	Netherlands	The ship was driven ashore near Middelkerke, West Flanders. She was on a voyage from Saint Petersburg to Schiedam, South Holland.
Wilhelmina	Danzig	The ship sprang a leak and was abandoned. Her crew were rescued. She was on a voyage from Danzig to Liverpool, Lancashire, United Kingdom.

== 10 October ==
List of shipwrecks: 10 October 1829
Ship	State	Description
Betsey and Mary	{{{flag}}}	The ship was driven ashore at Humberstone, Lincolnshire.
Durham	United Kingdom	The ship was driven ashore at Humberstone.
Elizabeth	United Kingdom	The ship was driven ashore at Humberstone.
Staines	United Kingdom	The ship foundered in the North Sea off Texel, North Holland, Netherlands. Her crew survived. She was on a voyage from Newcastle upon Tyne, Northumberland to Danzig, Prussia.
Tiber	United Kingdom	The ship was driven ashore at Humberstone. She was refloated on 30 October and taken in to Hull, Yorkshire.

== 11 October ==
List of shipwrecks: 11 October 1829
Ship	State	Description
Amiable	France	The ship was wrecked on the Cross Sand, in the North Sea off Great Yarmouth, Norfolk. Her crew were rescued. She was on a voyage from Cherbourg, Seine-Inférieure to Newcastle upon Tyne, Northumberland, United Kingdom.
Catherine Maria	Netherlands	The ship was driven ashore at the "Triessche-gat" with the loss of her captain. She was on a voyage from Riga, Russia to Amsterdam, North Holland.
Isis	United Kingdom	The ship was in collision with Cumberland (United Kingdom) in the North Sea 3 nautical miles (5.6 km) north of Scarborough, Yorkshire and sank. Her crew were rescued by Cumberland.

== 12 October ==
List of shipwrecks: 12 October 1829
Ship	State	Description
Bonito	United Kingdom	The ship was lost in the Gulf of St. Lawrence.
Britannia	United Kingdom	The paddle steamer sank at Donaghadee, County Antrim. All on board were rescued. She was on a voyage from Newry, County Antrim to Glasgow, Renfrewshire.
Kron Prins	Netherlands	The ship departed from Amsterdam, North Holland for London, United Kingdom. She subsequently foundered, wreckage from the ship washed up on the Dutch coast on 1 November.
St. Daniel	Greifswald	The ship foundered in the North Sea. Her crew were rescued. She was on a voyage from Shoreham-by-Sea, Sussex to Griefswald.

== 13 October ==
List of shipwrecks: 13 October 1829
Ship	State	Description
Alliance	United Kingdom	The barque was driven ashore at Great Yarmouth, Norfolk. She was on a voyage from Bristol, Gloucestershire to Newcastle upon Tyne, Northumberland.
Adriatic	United Kingdom	The ship was driven ashore and wrecked at Sunderland, County Durham. Her crew were rescued.
Barbara	United Kingdom	The ship was driven ashore and wrecked at Sunderland. Her crew were rescued.
Blagdon	United Kingdom	The ship was wrecked at Sunderland. Her crew were rescued.
Caledonia	United Kingdom	The ship was driven ashore and wrecked at Sunderland. Her crew were rescued.
Catherine	United Kingdom	The sloop was driven ashore and wrecked at Sunderland. Her crew were rescued.
Clio	United Kingdom	The ship was driven ashore near Hartlepool, County Durham.
Dois Sostre	Portugal	The ship was wrecked at the mouth of the Dwina with the loss of all hands. She was on a voyage from Lisbon to Saint Petersburg, Russia.
Eleanor	United Kingdom	The sloop foundered in the North Sea off Sunderland with the loss of all four of her crew.
Friends	United Kingdom	The ship was driven ashore and wrecked at Sunderland. Her crew were rescued.
Hunter	United Kingdom	The ship was driven ashore and wrecked at Sunderland. Her crew were rescued.
Isis	United Kingdom	The ship was driven ashore.
James	United Kingdom	The ship was driven ashore.
Lion	United Kingdom	The ship was driven ashore and wrecked near "Bolderao". She was on a voyage from Londonderry to Saint Petersburg.
Lively's Increase	United Kingdom	The brig was driven ashore and wrecked near Mundesley, Norfolk. She was on a voyage from Hull, Yorkshire to London. Her crew were rescued by rocket apparatus.
Louisa	United Kingdom	The ship was driven ashore and wrecked at Sunderland. Her crew were rescued.
Margaret	United Kingdom	The ship was driven ashore and wrecked at Sunderland. Her crew were rescued.
Mary	United Kingdom	The ship was driven ashore near Mundesley.
Nœvius	United Kingdom	The ship was driven ashore and wrecked at Sunderland.
Phœnix	United Kingdom	The ship was driven ashore and wrecked at Sunderland. Her crew were rescued.
Providence	United Kingdom	The ship was driven ashore near Mundesley. She was on a voyage from London to Spalding, Lincolnshire
Sythe	United Kingdom	The ship was driven ashore and wrecked at Sunderland. Her crew were rescued.
Thomas	United Kingdom	The ship was driven ashore and wrecked at Sunderland. Her crew were rescued.
Thomas Fenwick	United Kingdom	The brig foundered in the North Sea off Sunderland after having been abandoned by her crew.
Thorney Close	United Kingdom	The ship was driven ashore and wrecked at Sunderland. Her crew were rescued.
Vine	United Kingdom	The ship was driven ashore and wrecked at Sunderland. Her crew were rescued.
William	United Kingdom	The ship was driven ashore near Woodside, Cheshire. She was on a voyage from Liverpool, Lancashire to Charleston, South Carolina, United States.
William	United Kingdom	The ship was driven ashore near Hartlepool.

== 14 October ==
List of shipwrecks: 14 October 1829
Ship	State	Description
Amiable Victoire	France	The ship was driven ashore at Reval, Russia. She was on a voyage from Saint Petersburg, Russia to Havre de Grâce, Seine-Inférieure.
Blessing	United Kingdom	The ship was driven ashore and wrecked near Filey, Yorkshire. Her crew were rescued. She was on a voyage from Spalding, Lincolnshire to Newcastle upon Tyne, Northumberland.
Cowslip	United Kingdom	The ship was driven ashore and wrecked at Scarborough, Yorkshire, She was on a voyage from King's Lynn, Norfolk to Grangemouth, Stirlingshire.
Isabella	United Kingdom	The ship was driven ashore at Filey. Her crew were rescued. She was on a voyage from Cromarty to Newcastle upon Tyne.
Malvina	United Kingdom	The schooner was lost on "Sulthorp" or "Salthorn". Her crew were rescued. She was on a voyage from London to Bremen.
Mary	United Kingdom	The ship was driven ashore at Sea Palling, Norfolk. Her crew were rescued. She was on a voyage from London to Leeds, Yorkshire.
Providence	United Kingdom	The ship was driven ashore at Weybourne, Norfolk. She was on a voyage from London to Spalding, Lincolnshire.
Thomas and Martha	United Kingdom	The ship was driven ashore at Filey. Her crew were rescued.
Wilhelmina	Prussia	The ship was wrecked at South Shields, County Durham with the loss of all hands.

== 15 October ==
List of shipwrecks: 15 October 1829
Ship	State	Description
Barbara	United Kingdom	The ship was driven ashore at Stanton, Northumberland.
Bee	United Kingdom	The ship was driven ashore at Stanton.
Clio	United Kingdom	The ship was driven ashore at Stanton.CM241029b/
Colluts	Stettin	The ship was wrecked on the Flockington Bank, in Liverpool Bay. She was on a voyage from Liverpool, Lancashire, United Kingdom to Stettin.
Duck	United Kingdom	The ship was driven ashore at Stanton.
Diana	Netherlands	The ship was driven ashore at Egmond aan Zee, North Holland. Her crew were rescued. She was on a voyage from Memel, Prussia to Harlingen, Friesland.
Peggy	United Kingdom	The ship was driven ashore at Stanton. She was on a voyage from Newcastle upon Tyne, Northumberland to Arbroath, Forfarshire.
Robert and Margaret	United Kingdom	The ship was driven ashore at Stanton. She was on a voyage from Hull to Alnmouth, Northumberland.
Tiber	United Kingdom	The ship was driven ashore between Cleethorpes and Tetney, Lincolnshire
William	United Kingdom	The ship was driven ashore at Stanton. She was on a voyage from London to Sunderland, County Durham.

== 16 October ==
List of shipwrecks: 16 October 1829
Ship	State	Description
Bank Note	United Kingdom	The sloop was driven ashore in Berwick Bay. All six people on board were rescued. She was on a voyage from Sunderland, County Durham to Brechin, Forfarshire.
Buffalo	United Kingdom	The ship was in collision with Hebden (United Kingdom) off Beachy Head, Sussex and foundered. She was on a voyage from Chichester, Sussex to South Shields, County Durham.
Catherine and Edward	United Kingdom	The ship departed from Youghal, County Cork for Newport, Monmouthshire. No further trace, presumed foundered in the Irish Sea with the loss of all hands.
Dolphin	United Kingdom	The prison ship sprang a leak and sank at Chatham, Kent with the loss of three lives. She was later refloated, repaired and returned to service.
Hope	United Kingdom	The ship foundered in the North Sea off Craigleith, East Lothian. There were three survivors.
Lively	United Kingdom	The ship was lost on the Mixon Shoal, in the Bristol Channel off Swansea, Glamorgan with the loss of three of her six crew. Survivors were rescued by the pilot cutter Sarah (United Kingdom).
Mary	United Kingdom	The ship was driven ashore at Cuxhaven She was on a voyage from Hamburg to Hull, Yorkshire.
Shubenacadie	United Kingdom	The brig capsized off Neuwerk, Hamburg. She was on a voyage from Hamburg to Saint John, New Brunswick, British North America.

== 17 October ==
List of shipwrecks: 17 October 1829
Ship	State	Description
Catherine	Stralsund	The ship was wrecked on the Norwegian coast. She was on a voyage from Stralsund to Bergen, Norway.
Four Friends	United Kingdom	The ship was wrecked on The Lizard, Cornwall. Her crew were rescued. She was on a voyage from Liverpool, Lancashire to Portsmouth, Hampshire.
Wavertree	United Kingdom	The ship was lost on the Long Sand, in the North Sea off the coast of Essex. Her crew survived. She was on a voyage from Hamburg to Liverpool.

== 18 October ==
List of shipwrecks: 18 October 1829
Ship	State	Description
Fanny	United Kingdom	The barque was wrecked on the Shipwash Sand, in the North Sea. Her crew were rescued. She was on a voyage from London to South Shields, County Durham.
Margaret	United Kingdom	The ship was driven ashore and wrecked at Beaumaris, Anglesey.

== 19 October ==
List of shipwrecks: 19 October 1829
Ship	State	Description
Norfolk	United Kingdom	The ship was wrecked on the Money Washer Bank, in the Irish Sea off Wexford. Her crew survived. She was on a voyage from Quebec City, Lower Canada, British North America to Newry, County Antrim. She was later taken in to Kingstown, County Dublin in a severely damaged state.

== 20 October ==
List of shipwrecks: 20 October 1829
Ship	State	Description
Ann	United States	The brig was driven ashore and wrecked at Frontignan, Hérault, France. Her crew were rescued. She was on a voyage from Marseille, Bouches-du-Rhône to Sète, Herault.
Marchioness of Donegal	United Kingdom	The ship was wrecked on Prince Edward Island, British North America with the loss of three of her crew.
Orion	United Kingdom	The ship was wrecked at Lyskil, Sweden with the loss of six of her crew.

== 21 October ==
List of shipwrecks: 21 October 1829
Ship	State	Description
Christopher	United Kingdom	The ship was driven ashore on Eierland, North Holland, Netherlands. Her crew were rescued. She was on a voyage from Bahia, Brazil to Hamburg.

== 22 October ==
List of shipwrecks: 22 October 1829
Ship	State	Description
Halcyon	United Kingdom	The yacht was wrecked off "the Saintes", France. Her crew were rescued.
Jane	United Kingdom	The brig was driven ashore at Penmaenmawr, Caernarfonshire.

== 23 October ==
List of shipwrecks: 23 October 1829
Ship	State	Description
Clara	Norway	The ship foundered off Skagen, Denmark. Her crew were rescued. She was on a voyage from Stralsund to Hull, Yorkshire, United Kingdom.
Douglas	United Kingdom	The ship was lost off Portlethen, Aberdeenshire. Her crew survived. She was n a voyage from Sunderland, County Durham to Aberdeen.

== 24 October ==
List of shipwrecks: 24 October 1829
Ship	State	Description
Albuera	United Kingdom	The ship struck the Haisborough Sands, in the North Sea off the coast of Norfolk and sank. Her crew were rescued. She was on a voyage from Newcastle upon Tyne, Northumberland to Gibraltar.
Amelia	United Kingdom	The ship foundered in the Atlantic Ocean. Her crew were rescued.
Haweis	(United Kingdom of Great Britain and Ireland) New South Wales	The brig departed from, Port Jackson for New Zealand. No further trace, presumed foundered in the Pacific Ocean with the loss of all on board.
Orion	United Kingdom	The ship departed from Helsingør, Denmark for London. No further trace, presumed foundered with the loss of all hands.

== 25 October ==
List of shipwrecks: 25 October 1829
Ship	State	Description
James	United Kingdom	The ship departed from Fraserburgh, Aberdeenshire for Hamburg. Subsequently foundered off Borkum with the loss of all hands.
Jonge Henry	Hamburg	The ship was wrecked on Baltrum. She was on a voyage from Hamburg to Aberdeen, United Kingdom.

== 26 October ==
List of shipwrecks: 26 October 1829
Ship	State	Description
Adeline	United Kingdom	The steamship was destroyed by fire at Dublin.
Eliza Wesley	(United Kingdom of Great Britain and Ireland) Virgin Islands	The ship was driven ashore on Saint Martin.
Indian Trader	(United Kingdom of Great Britain and Ireland)	A steamboat towed the ship into Stockholm. Indian Trader had been sailing from "Laguna" to St Petersburg when she had struck on Gotland. It was expected that Indian Trader would be condemned.

== 27 October ==
List of shipwrecks: 27 October 1829
Ship	State	Description
Rosina	United Kingdom	The ship was driven ashore at Falsterbo, Sweden. She was on a voyage from Pärnu, Russia to Dundee, Forfarshire.
Suomi	Sweden	The ship was driven ashore in the Isefjord. Her crew were rescued.
Von Gubiliana	flag unknown	The ship was wrecked near Trieste.

== 29 October ==
List of shipwrecks: 29 October 1829
Ship	State	Description
Adele	France	The ship sank in the Seine at Quillebeuf-sur-Seine, Eure.
Alexander	United Kingdom	The sloop was abandoned in the North Sea. She was on a voyage from Helmsdale, Caithness to London.
Conquérant	French Navy	The Bucentaure-class ship of the line was damaged by fire at Smyrna, Ottoman Empire.

== 30 October ==
List of shipwrecks: 30 October 1829
Ship	State	Description
Ælfleda	United Kingdom	The brig was driven ashore and wrecked on Götaland, Sweden. There were two survivors. She was on a voyage from Gallipoli, Ottoman Empire to Saint Petersburg, Russia.
Excellent	United Kingdom	The ship was driven ashore and wrecked at Waxham, Norfolk. Her crew were rescued. She was on a voyage from Aberdeen to London.
Mary Ann	United Kingdom	The brig was wrecked on the Nobbin Reef, off Anholt. Her crew were rescued. She was on a voyage from Saint Petersburg to London.
Rising Star	United Kingdom	The ship was driven ashore 20 nautical miles (37 km) from "Helsingford", Sweden, where she was wrecked on 1 November. She was on a voyage from Saint Petersburg to London.

== 31 October ==
List of shipwrecks: 31 October 1829
Ship	State	Description
Ann and Margaret	(United Kingdom of Great Britain and Ireland) British North America	The ship was wrecked at Herring Cove, Nova Scotia with the loss of thirteen lives. She was on a voyage from Quebec City, Lower Canada to Halifax, Nova Scotia.
Caledonia	United Kingdom	The ship foundered in the Atlantic Ocean off Mount Desert Island, Maine, United States. Her crew were rescued.
Governor Griswold	(United Kingdom of Great Britain and Ireland) Bermuda	The ship sprang a leak and was abandoned in the Atlantic Ocean.
Lily	United Kingdom	The ship was driven ashore and wrecked at Boulogne, Pas-de-Calais, France. Her crew were rescued. She was on a voyage from Southampton, Hampshire to Sunderland, County Durham.

== Unknown date ==
List of shipwrecks: Unknown date in October 1829
Ship	State	Description
Anna	United Kingdom	The brig was wrecked between Estepona, Spain and Gibraltar between 18 and 22 October.
Agenor	United Kingdom	The brig was wrecked on the Gunfleet Sand, in the North Sea off the coast of Essex.
Aranyone	France	The ship was wrecked on Gorée before 29 October. Her crew were rescued.
Blessing	United Kingdom	The ship was driven ashore at Filey, Yorkshire.
Catherine and Edward	United Kingdom	The sloop departed from Youghal, County Cork for Bristol, Gloucestershire in late October. No further trace, presumed foundered with the loss of all hands.
Earl Moira	United Kingdom	The ship was lost off "Patten".
Huske Staatsrad	Norway	The ship was driven ashore whilst on a voyage from Lillesand to Altona, Hamburg.
James	United Kingdom	The ship was wrecked on the Newarp Sand, in the North Sea before 16 October with the loss of all hands. She was on a voyage from London to Hamburg.
M^{c}Kenzie	United Kingdom	The ship was driven ashore.
Nymph	United Kingdom	The ship was wrecked on Møn, Denmark. She was on a voyage from Saint Petersburg, Russia to Liverpool, Lancashire.
Romulus	Hamburg	The ship was wrecked on Scharhörn. She was on a voyage from New York, United States to Hamburg.
Rosina	United Kingdom	The ship was driven ashore at "Falstadt". She was on a voyage from Pärnu, Russia to Dundee, Forfarshire.
Salacia	United Kingdom	The ship was lost at Saint John, New Brunswick, British North America before 16 October.
Staines	United Kingdom	The ship foundered in the North Sea.
Two Brothers	United Kingdom	The ship sprang a leak and was beached at Grimsby, Lincolnshire before 14 October. She was on a voyage from Great Yarmouth, Norfolk to Sunderland, County Durham.
