= Mercenary revolt =

Mercenary Revolt may refer to:

- The Mercenary War (c. 240 BC) (also, Libyan War or Truceless War), an uprising of troops employed by Carthage at the end of the First Punic War
- Irish and German Mercenary Soldiers' Revolt, in Rio de Janeiro in 1828 during the Cisplatine War
- The Mercenaries' Mutinies in the Congo, 1966 and 1967
