= Abdication of Pedro I of Brazil =

1831 event starting Brazil's regency period

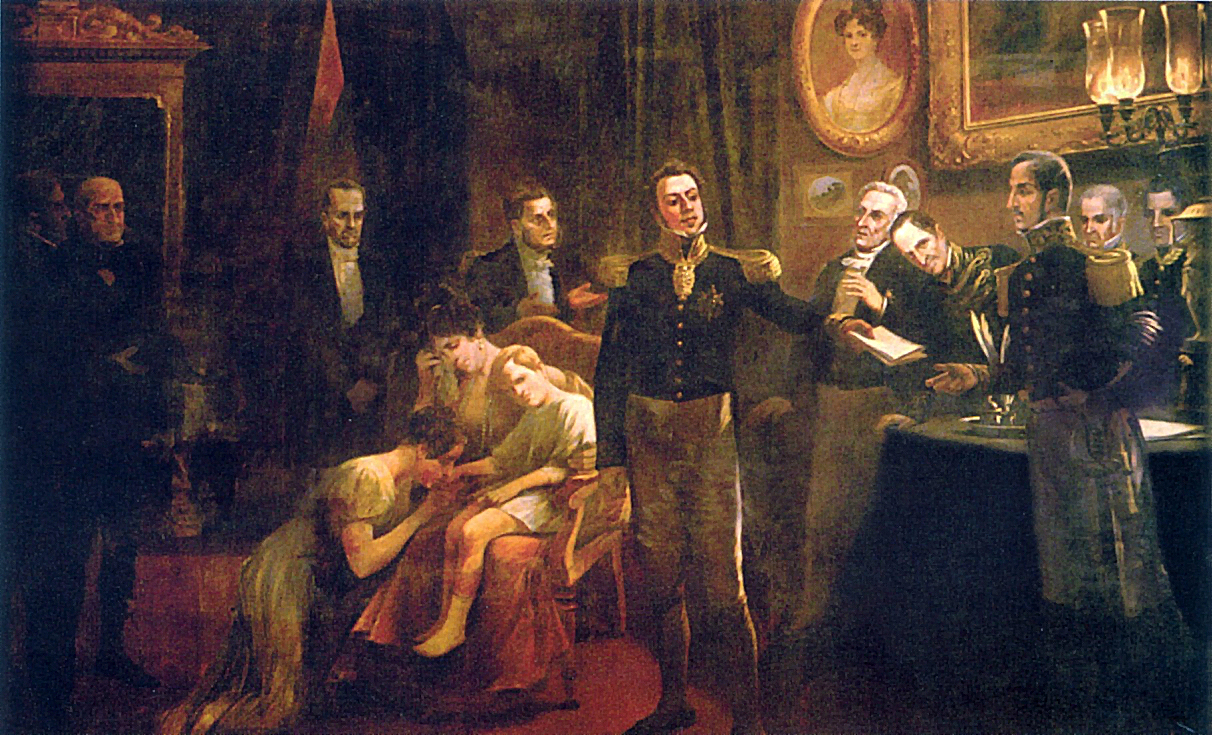
- Pedro I delivering his abdication letter to major Frias, by Aurélio de Figueiredo
- Date: 7 April 1831
- Location: Rio de Janeiro
- Outcome: Pedro I abdicates the Brazilian throne in favour of his son Pedro II; Beginning of the Regency Period
- Related event: Night of the Bottle Fight

The abdication of emperor Pedro I of Brazil took place on 7 April 1831 in favor of his son Pedro II. The act marked the end of the so-called First Reign and the beginning of the regency period in Brazil.

== Background ==
The independence of Brazil led to a political system that made the municipalities dependent on the provinces, and these on the central power; it also resulted in "a system of indirect elections based on qualified (census) voting, excluding most of the population from the electoral process. They eagerly disputed titles of nobility and monopolized positions in the Chamber, Senate, Council of State and Ministries".

This "Council of State" implemented the Moderating Power instituted by emperor Pedro I, when he dissolved the Constituent Assembly: formed by lifetime members, appointed by the monarch, no more than ten in number, their function to be heard "in all serious matters and general measures of public administration, especially concerning the declaration of war, the settlement of peace, negotiations with foreign nations, as well as on all occasions when the emperor proposed to exercise any of the prerrogatives of the Moderating Power".

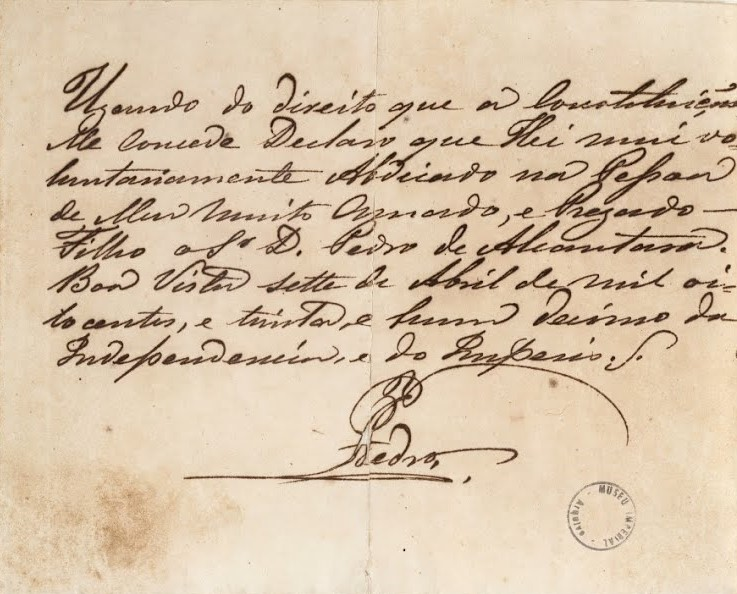
Letter of abdication, 1831.

The liberals were strongly opposed to this. In 1830 a liberal revolt took place in France which resulted in the deposition of King Charles X. This revolt influenced other countries with liberal ideas. In Brazil, newspapers such as the Aurora Fluminense, published in Rio de Janeiro, began to appear. They strongly opposed the conservative ministry imposed by Pedro I.

Evaristo da Veiga had written in the Aurora Fluminense: "If the will of the people is dominated by terror, our freedom will necessarily be reduced to a mere shadow". In São Paulo, Líbero Badaró headed the periodical O Observador Constitucional, where he protested against the authorities, many of which were Portuguese. Badaró, an Italian journalist based in Brazil, was murdered in an ambush, causing a deep impression on public opinion.

The emperor travelled to Minas Gerais province with the aim of quelling liberal agitations led by Bernardo Pereira de Vasconcelos, but there he was met with apathy.

== The night of the Bottle Fight ==
When Pedro I returned to the court, on March 11, he had already thought about abdication. The local Portuguese nationals, as well as members of the court of the Kingdom of Portugal, held a demonstration in support of the emperor with lamps, coming into conflict with the Brazilians, who attacked the emperor with shouts of "long live the constitution!" or "long live Dom Pedro II", in what went down in history with the name of "night of the bottle fight". The conflict lasted for three days and generated more friction between the Brazilians and the Portuguese.

== The last moments of Pedro I as emperor ==
With the capital Rio de Janeiro in great turmoil, Pedro I dismissed the ministry and summoned a new one. This new ministry, which contained two Portuguese members, irritated a public beset with anti-Portuguese sentiment. Thus, the leaders of the liberal and nativist movements called the people to the streets. The people gathered in the Campo da Aclamação, chosen due to its proximity to opposition newspapers such as O Repúblico, and demanded the return of the previous ministry. This demand was communicated to the emperor through a delegation of parish judges, to whom he replied:

"I will do everything for the people, but nothing by the people".

The emperor defended himself by saying it was his right guaranteed by the constitution to appoint ministers and that if he obeyed the people's request, he would stop being the defender of the will of the Nation and would become a tool controlled by the majority. Thus, he would defend the interest of the people, but would not be an instrument of the people.

The troops joined the movement, leaving the monarch without the support of the military. In a last attempt to compose a new ministry, this time in accordance with popular desires, the emperor reached out to Nicolau Pereira de Campos Vergueiro, but could not find him.

== Abdication and departure ==
"Using the right that the Constitution grants me, I declare that I have voluntarily abdicated in favour of my very beloved and dear son, Mr. D. Pedro de Alcântara".

Boa Vista, April 7, one thousand eight hundred and thirty-one, a tenth of the Independence and the Empire.

— Emperor Pedro I

After writing his abdication, the now former emperor handed over the resignation letter to major Miguel de Frias e Vasconcelos (commander of the São José das Ilha das Cobras fortress) who had come to inform him of the mood of the troops and the people, saying then, with teary eyes: "Here is my abdication; I wish you to be happy! I retire to Europe and leave a country that I loved and that I still love." It was two o'clock in the morning of 7 April 1831.

Viriato Correia wrote that:

"The chronicles of the time portray in an emotional way the moment when Pedro I, after his abdication, went to say goodbye to his son. It's night. The monarch boy sleeps peacefully in his child's bed. Pedro enters the room and stands next to the boy. He doesn't have the courage to wake him up. [He] keeps looking at him for a long time. Tears soak his eyes; the sobs choke his throat and, fearing that weakness, he leaves the room, wiping his eyes".

On the morning of the same day, the former emperor embarked on the English ship Warspite, accompanied by his pregnant wife Amélie of Leuchtenberg and their daughter, Princess Maria, leaving in Brazil Pedro II, who was five years old, his sisters the princesses Januária, who was nine years old, Paula, who was eight years old, and Francisca, who was seven years old, children of Pedro's first marriage.

The English ship, however, did not leave for Europe. Days after boarding, Pedro transferred with his wife to the frigate Volage, while princess Maria continued on the voyage to Europe on board the French corvette La Seine. As tutor to the future emperor, Pedro left José Bonifácio, with whom he had recently reconciled.

== Consequences ==
While in Europe, Pedro took up arms against his brother Miguel, in order to ensure the succession to the Portuguese throne for his daughter Maria. In Brazil, given the minority of Pedro II, the troubled and important regency period began, lasting for a decade, until Pedro II was legally declared of age by the Senate on 23 July 1840.
