= List of shipwrecks in November 1827 =

The list of shipwrecks in November 1827 includes ships sunk, foundered, grounded, or otherwise lost during November 1827.

== 1 November ==
List of shipwrecks: 1 November 1827
Ship	State	Description
Ann	United Kingdom	The ship capsized in the River Severn at Beachley, Gloucestershire. She was on a voyage from Miramichi, Nova Scotia, British North America to Gloucester.
Anna Margaretha	Denmark	The ship was wrecked near "Salboe", Jutland. She was on a voyage from Haderslev to "Wyburg".
Caroline	Netherlands	The ship was stranded at "Milton". She was on a voyage from Amsterdam, North Holland to Dram, Norway.
Hope	United Kingdom	The ship foundered off Ameland, Friesland, Netherlands. She was on a voyage from Newcastle upon Tyne, Northumberland to Hamburg.
Humber	United Kingdom	The ship was wrecked on Læsø, Denmark. Her crew were rescued. She was on a voyage from Saint Petersburg, Russia to London.
Josephine	Sweden	The steamship caught fire in Mälaren and was beached. Her crew and all 140 passengers survived but the ship was destroyed.
Minna	United Kingdom	The ship was driven ashore and wrecked on Nordeney, Kingdom of Hanover. She was on a voyage from Hull, Yorkshire to Hamburg.
Neptune	United Kingdom	The ship was driven ashore and wrecked at Tunstal, Yorkshire. Her crew were rescued by rocket apparatus.
Sylph	United Kingdom	The ship was driven ashore and wrecked on Norderney. She was on a voyage from Hull to Hamburg.
Vesta	United Kingdom	The ship was abandoned in the North Sea off the Dogger Bank. Her crew were rescued. She was on a voyage from Liverpool, Lancashire to Bremen.
Vrow Maria	Netherlands	The ship was driven ashore on Norderney, Kingdom of Hanover with the loss of four lives.

== 4 November ==
List of shipwrecks: 4 November 1827
Ship	State	Description
Albuera	United Kingdom	The ship was driven ashore near Memel, Prussia. Her crew were rescued by the Memel Lifeboat.
Carl Wilhelm	Netherlands	The ship was driven ashore in the Vlie.

== 5 November ==
List of shipwrecks: 5 November 1827
Ship	State	Description
Asadalia	United Kingdom	The ship was wrecked on Pictou Island, Nova Scotia, British North America.
Janet	United Kingdom	The sloop was wrecked near Rosehearty, Aberdeenshire. Her crew were rescued.
Mary	United Kingdom	The barque was driven ashore and wrecked in the River John, Nova Scotia.

== 7 November ==
List of shipwrecks: 7 November 1827
Ship	State	Description
Aurora	United Kingdom	The ship was wrecked near Sandy Hook, New Jersey, United States with the loss of six lives. She was on a voyage from Liverpool, Lancashire to New York, United States.

== 9 November ==
List of shipwrecks: 9 November 1827
Ship	State	Description
Egir	Hamburg	The ship was stranded between Neuwerk and "Duhner". She was on a voyage from Altona, Hamburg to Copenhagen, Denmark.
Jane and Isabella	United Kingdom	The ship was driven ashore on Copeland Island, County Down.

== 10 November ==
List of shipwrecks: 10 November 1827
Ship	State	Description
Berwick Packet	United Kingdom	The ship was driven ashore at Gothenburg, Sweden. She was on a voyage from Saint Petersburg, Russia to London.
David	United Kingdom	The ship ran aground on the Herd Sand, in the North Sea off Hartlepool, County Durham. She was refloated on 18 November and taken in to North Shields.
Fortitude	United Kingdom	The ship was abandoned in the Atlantic Ocean with the loss of a crew member. Her crew were rescued by Princess Charlotte (United Kingdom). She was on a voyage from London to St. John's, Newfoundland, British North America.
Gipsey	United Kingdom	The ship was wrecked on the Barber Sand, She was on a voyage from Great Yarmouth, Norfolk to Newcastle upon Tyne, Northumberland.
Honora	United Kingdom	The schooner was wrecked at "Matan", British North America. She was on a voyage from Quebec City, Lower Canada, British North America to Belfast, County Antrim.

== 11 November ==
List of shipwrecks: 11 November 1827
Ship	State	Description
Habet	Norway	The ship was abandoned in the North Sea off Domesnes. She was on a voyage from Porsgrunn to London, United Kingdom.
Mars	United Kingdom	The ship was driven ashore at Liverpool, Lancashire. She was on a voyage from Sligo to Liverpool. She was later refloated.

== 13 November ==
List of shipwrecks: 13 November 1827
Ship	State	Description
Ann	United Kingdom	The ship was driven ashore and wrecked at Whitburn, County Durham, She was on a voyage from London to North Shields, County Durham.
James	United Kingdom	The ship was driven ashore and wrecked at Whitburn. She was on a voyage from London to North Shields.
Vertumnus	United Kingdom	The ship was driven ashore and wrecked at Whitburn. She was on a voyage from London to North Shields.

== 14 November ==
List of shipwrecks: 14 November 1827
Ship	State	Description
Elizabeth	United Kingdom	The ship was driven ashore at Gorleston, Suffolk. Her crew were rescued. She was on a voyage from Medemblik, North Holland, Netherlands to Great Yarmouth, Norfolk.
Frederick and Betsey	United Kingdom	The ship was severely damaged on the Spanish Battery Rocks, in the North Sea at North Shields, County Durham. She was later refloated and taken in to North Shields.
Gipsy	United Kingdom	The ship was wrecked on the Barber Sand, in the North Sea off the coast of Norfolk. Her crew were rescued.

== 16 November ==
List of shipwrecks: 16 November 1827
Ship	State	Description
Fowler	United Kingdom	The ship was driven ashore at Landsend, Yorkshire.

== 18 November ==
List of shipwrecks: 18 November 1827
Ship	State	Description
New London	United Kingdom	The ship struck a rock and was consequently beached at Arichat, Nova Scotia, British North America. She was on a voyage from Haiti to Prince Edward Island, British North America.

== 19 November ==
List of shipwrecks: 19 November 1827
Ship	State	Description
Olivia	(United Kingdom of Great Britain and Ireland) New South Wales	The schooner was wrecked in Twofold Bay. All eight people on board survived. She was on a voyage from Launceston, Van Diemen's Land to Sydney.

== 20 November ==
List of shipwrecks: 20 November 1827
Ship	State	Description
Aurora	United States	Bound from Liverpool, England, to New York City carrying 40 passengers, a crew of 11, and a cargo of US$50,000 to US$60,000 worth of china, coal, hardware, and household goods, the 106-foot (32.3 m) three-masted sailing vessel was wrecked in 11 feet (3.4 m) of water on the coast of New Jersey 6 miles (9.7 km) south of Sandy Hook. Her masts fell. All 40 passengers and five crew members reached shore safely, but six crewmen who refused to attempt to reach shore died aboard her wreck by the following day. Her wreck became submerged in 12 feet (3.7 m) of water.
Endeavour	United Kingdom	The ship was wrecked near Montrose, Forfarshire. Her crew were rescued.
Ida	United Kingdom	The ship was run down and sunk in the North Sea off Winterton-on-Sea, Norfolk. Her crew were rescued.
Isabella	United Kingdom	The ship was driven ashore and wrecked in the Bay of Killala.

== 21 November ==
List of shipwrecks: 21 November 1827
Ship	State	Description
Star	United Kingdom	The ship was wrecked on Prince Edward Island, British North America. Her crew were rescued. She was on a voyage from Miramichi, New Brunswick, British North America to Liverpool, Lancashire.
Wilkin	United Kingdom	The ship was wrecked off Memel. Prussia with the loss of eight of her crew.

== 22 November ==
List of shipwrecks: 22 November 1827
Ship	State	Description
Bonaparte	(United Kingdom of Great Britain and Ireland) British North America	The ship was lost near "Degrot de Ferolle" Newfoundland with the loss of three of her crew. She was on a voyage from Quebec City, Lower Canada to Greenock, Renfrewshire, United Kingdom.
Hero	United Kingdom	The ship was driven ashore and severely damaged at Bally William, County Antrim. She was on a voyage from Whitehaven, Cumberland to Belfast, County Antrim.

== 23 November ==
List of shipwrecks: 23 November 1827
Ship	State	Description
British Merchant	United Kingdom	The ship was wrecked on the coast of Newfoundland, British North America. Her crew were rescued
Spartan	United Kingdom	The ship was driven ashore and wrecked near Karlskrona, Sweden. She was on a voyage from Saint Petersburg, Russia to Hull, Yorkshire.

== 24 November ==
List of shipwrecks: 24 November 1827
Ship	State	Description
Navigator	United Kingdom	The ship was wrecked at Manila, Spanish East Indies.
Pacific	United Kingdom	The ship was sunk by ice in Miramichi Bay.

== 25 November ==
List of shipwrecks: 25 November 1827
Ship	State	Description
Economy	United Kingdom	The ship was driven ashore in the River Wear at Sunderland, County Durham.
Harbinger	United Kingdom	The ship ran aground and sank in the River Wear at Sunderland.
Mary	United Kingdom	The ship ran aground and sank in the River Wear at Sunderland.

== 26 November ==
List of shipwrecks: 26 November 1827
Ship	State	Description
Menai	United Kingdom	The ship was driven ashore at Warrenpoint, County Down. She was on a voyage from Bangor to Belfast, County Antrim.
Return	United Kingdom	The ship was driven ashore at Sunderland, County Durham. She was refloated the next day.

== 27 November ==
List of shipwrecks: 27 November 1827
Ship	State	Description
Mary	United Kingdom	The ship was wrecked at Lista, Norway. She was on a voyage from Londonderry to Riga, Russia.
Venus	United Kingdom	The ship was driven ashore and wrecked near Milford Haven, Pembrokeshire. She was on a voyage from Newport, Monmouthshire to Limerick.

== 28 November ==
List of shipwrecks: 28 November 1827
Ship	State	Description
Bee	United Kingdom	The schooner was wrecked on the Haisborough Sands, in the North Sea off the coast of Norfolk. She was on a voyage from Bridport, Dorset to Newcastle upon Tyne, Northumberland.
Blue Eyed Maid	United Kingdom	The ship was driven ashore in Dundrum Bay. She was on a voyage from Liverpool, Lancashire to Newcastle upon Tyne.
Clio	United Kingdom	The brig was driven ashore and wrecked at Freswick, Caithness.
Francis Ernest	United Kingdom	The ship was driven ashore and severely damaged at Odesa.
Hero	United Kingdom	The ship was run down and sunk in the North Sea off the coast of Norfolk. Her crew survived.

== 29 November ==
List of shipwrecks: 29 November 1827
Ship	State	Description
Emilie	Netherlands	The ship foundered off Frederikshavn, Denmark. Her crew were rescued. She was on a voyage from Amsterdam, North Holland to Stettin, Prussia.

== 30 November ==
List of shipwrecks: 30 November 1827
Ship	State	Description
Sophia Johanna	Hamburg	The ship was driven ashore at "Saby". She was on a voyage from Hamburg to Drammen, Norway.
Stirling Castle	United Kingdom	The ship was wrecked on this date. She was on a voyage from Cardiff, Glamorgan to the Maas.

== Unknown date ==
List of shipwrecks: Unknown date in November 1827
Ship	State	Description
Barbadoes	United Kingdom	The schooner was abandoned in ice in the St. Lawrence River, British North America.
Charlotte and Mary	United Kingdom	The transport ship was wrecked north of Cape Frio, Argentina. She was on a voyage from Cork to Rio de Janeiro, Brazil.
Caroline	United Kingdom	The brig was wrecked in British North America.
Dolphin	United Kingdom	The schooner was abandoned in ice in the St. Lawrence River. She subsequently became a wreck.
Earl Dalhousie	United Kingdom	The brig was driven ashore on Goose Island, British North America.
Esther	United Kingdom	The brig was driven ashore on Crane Island, British North America.
Gegleuze Unternehmung	Hamburg	The ship was driven ashore and wrecked on Spiekeroog, Duchy of Saxony with the probable loss of all hands. She was on a voyage from Málaga, Spain to Hamburg.
King Fisher	United Kingdom	The brig was driven ashore on Goose Island.
Mary	United Kingdom	The ship was lost on Prince Edward Island, British North America.
Norfolk Hero	United Kingdom	The ship was lost off Aldeburgh, Suffolk. She was on a voyage from Riga, Russia to London.
Ottawa	United Kingdom	The full-rigged ship was driven ashore in British North America.
Robert	United Kingdom	The brig was wrecked on Anticosti Island, Lower Canada.
Sarah Maria	United Kingdom	The ship was wrecked in the St. Lawrence River.
St. Ann	United Kingdom	The schooner was driven ashore on Crane Island.
Utility	United Kingdom	The ship foundered in the Grand Banks of Newfoundland with the loss of all hands.
Veronica	France	The ship was wrecked off Wexford, United Kingdom. Her crew were rescued by Caroline (United States).
William	United Kingdom	The ship was lost off the coast of Jutland.
William Hunter	United Kingdom	The ship was wrecked in the Barnaby River, British North America.
