= Miguel de Frias e Vasconcelos =

Miguel de Frias
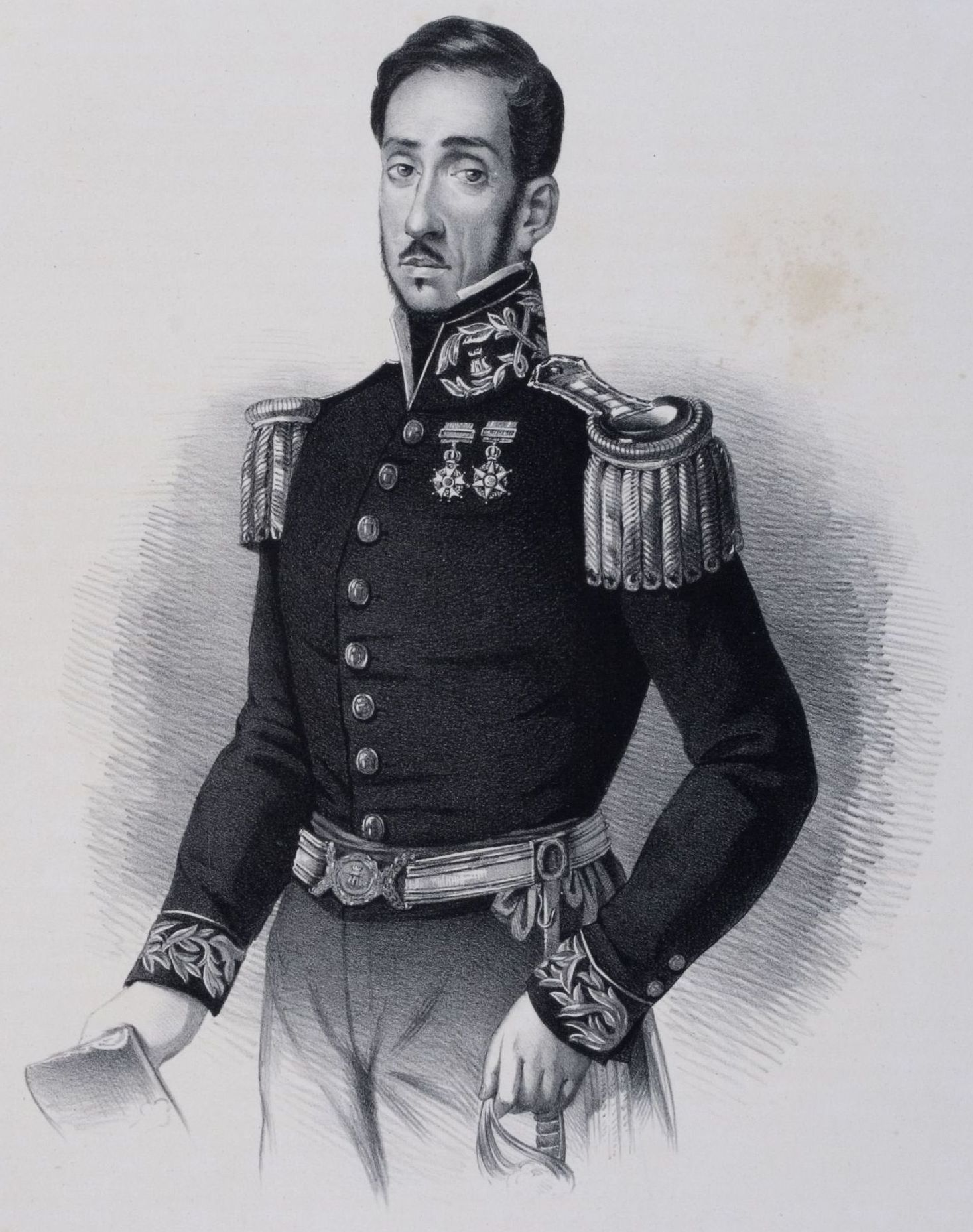

President of the Municipal Chamber of Rio de Janeiro
- In office 1853–1856
- Preceded by: Cândido Borges Monteiro
- Succeeded by: João de Oliveira Fausto

Personal details
- Born: 15 October 1805 Rio de Janeiro, Colonial Brazil
- Died: 25 May 1859 (aged 53) Rio de Janeiro, Empire of Brazil
- Occupation: Military officer; politician; engineer

Military service
- Allegiance: Empire of Brazil
- Branch/service: Imperial Brazilian Army
- Years of service: 1820–1859
- Battles/wars: Mercenaries Revolt; Ragamuffin War; Uruguayan Civil War

Miguel de Frias e Vasconcelos (15 October 1805 – 25 May 1859) was a Brazilian military officer, engineer and politician, best known for having received the abdication letter from emperor Pedro I on 7 April 1831.

== Biography ==
Frias e Vasconcelos was born on 15 October 1805. His father was lieutenant colonel Joaquim de Frias Vasconcelos. Frias e Vasconcelos followed his father's career as a soldier in the 1st Cavalry Regiment at the age of 15. An artillery officer three years later, he joined the Military School. He subsequently advanced in the ranks to the rank of major.

In his military career Frias e Vasconcelos took part in the repression against the Mercenaries Revolt, in 1828; in the Ragamuffin War in Rio Grande do Sul from 1842 to 1844, and in the campaign in Uruguay, under the orders of the Marquis of Caxias, who requisitioned Vasconcelos to be his chief of staff.

On the night of 6 April 1831, as the commander of the Fortress of São José da Ilha das Cobras, he went to the Paço de São Cristóvão by orders of general Francisco de Lima e Silva to inform the emperor of the state of agitation in which the people and troops were. The liberals reacted to the appointment of an absolutist ministry by the emperor who, in the face of adverse reaction, decided to form a new body of ministers led by liberal Nicolau Pereira de Campos Vergueiro who, however, was not found. At two o'clock in the morning of the following day, the Emperor resigned in favor of his unpubescent son, delivering the Letter of Abdication to Frias e Vasconcelos, saying then, with teary eyes: "Here is my abdication; I wish you to be happy! I retire to Europe and leave a country I loved and still love".

He was a member of several commissions, such as director of the War Arsenal, president of the commission for the improvement of army equipment and director of the public works of the Court, both civil and military.

In Rio de Janeiro, the Capital of the Empire of Brazil, he was responsible for plumbing the waters of the Maracanã river, responsible for major floods in previous years.

Between 1853 and 1856 he was the President of the Municipal Chamber of Rio de Janeiro. He was elected with 4,451 votes, but the election was annulled and held once more, with Frias e Vasconcelos being once again the most voted.

Frias e Vasconcelos died on 25 May 1859.
