= List of shipwrecks in September 1827 =

The list of shipwrecks in September 1827 includes some ships sunk, wrecked or otherwise lost during September 1827.

== 1 September ==
List of shipwrecks: 1 September 1827
Ship	State	Description
Fame	(United Kingdom of Great Britain and Ireland) British North America	The ship capsized in the Atlantic Ocean (37°30′N 66°30′W) in a hurricane. Her crew were rescued by Stranger (United States). She was on a voyage from Yarmouth, Nova Scotia to Bermuda.

== 6 September ==
List of shipwrecks: 6 September 1827
Ship	State	Description
Charlotte	(United Kingdom of Great Britain and Ireland) New South Wales	The schooner was driven ashore crewless north of Newcastle. She was on a voyage from Newcastle to Sydney.
Vijf Gesusters	Netherlands	The ship was wrecked on Gorée, Dakar.

== 7 September ==
List of shipwrecks: 7 September 1827
Ship	State	Description
Columbian	United Kingdom	The ship departed from Bahia, Brazil for Liverpool, Lancashire. No further trace, presumed foundered in the Atlantic Ocean with the loss of all hands.

== 8 September ==
List of shipwrecks: 8 September 1827
Ship	State	Description
Michigan	(United Kingdom of Great Britain and Ireland) British North America	The schooner was wrecked when she went over Niagara Falls.

== 9 September ==
List of shipwrecks: 9 September 1827
Ship	State	Description
Twende Sodskende	Denmark	The ship foundered in the Atlantic Ocean off the Isles of Scilly, United Kingdom. Her crew were rescued. She was on a voyage from Bilbao, Spain to Copenhagen.

== 10 September ==
List of shipwrecks: 10 September 1827
Ship	State	Description
Euterpe	United Kingdom	The ship was abandoned in the Atlantic Ocean. She was on a voyage from Halifax, Nova Scotia, British North America to Jamaica.

== 12 September ==
List of shipwrecks: 12 September 1827
Ship	State	Description
Cato	United Kingdom	The ship was wrecked on the Kentish Knock, in the North Sea off Margate, Kent. Her crew were rescued. She was on a voyage from Arkhangelsk, Russia to London.
HMS Hearty	Royal Navy	The Cherokee-class brig-sloop departed from Falmouth, Cornwall. She was later reported to be a few days sail from Barbados, after which no further trace. Presumed destroyed by fire and lost with all hands.

== 13 September ==
List of shipwrecks: 13 September 1827
Ship	State	Description
Brothers	United Kingdom	The ship struck a sunken rock off Deadman's Island, Nova Scotia, British North America and foundered. Her crew survived. She was on a voyage from Quebec City, Lower Canada, British North America to Bristol, Gloucestershire.

== 19 September ==
List of shipwrecks: 19 September 1827
Ship	State	Description
Despatch	United Kingdom	The ship was driven ashore at False Hook, New Jersey, United States. She was on a voyage from New York to Cádiz, Spain.
Endeavour	United Kingdom	The ship was driven ashore at Staithes, Yorkshire.
Harton	United Kingdom	The ship was wrecked on the Sunk Sand, in the North Sea off the coast of Essex. Her crew were rescued. She was on a voyage from Newcastle upon Tyne, Northumberland to Honfleur, Calvados, France.

== 20 September ==
List of shipwrecks: 20 September 1827
Ship	State	Description
Solide	France	The ship foundered in the Mediterranean Sea off Cape Fiera. She was on a voyage from Marseille, Bouches-du-Rhône to Ajaccio, Corsica.

== 21 September ==
List of shipwrecks: 21 September 1827
Ship	State	Description
Echo	United Kingdom	The ship was wrecked on Tory Island, County Donegal with the loss of a crew member, She was on a voyage from Limerick to Glasgow, Renfrewshire.
Harriet	United Kingdom	The ship was wrecked on the Nash Sand, in the Bristol Channel. She was on a voyage from Cardiff, Glamorgan to London.
Hebe	United Kingdom	The ship was wrecked on the Gunfleet Sand, in the North Sea off the coast of Essex. Her crew were rescued. She was on a voyage from North Shields, County Durham to London.

== 22 September ==
List of shipwrecks: 22 September 1827
Ship	State	Description
Phœnix	United Kingdom	The ship was wrecked on the Mouse Sand, in the Irish Sea off the coast of Anglesey. Her crew were rescued. She was on a voyage from Bangor, Caernarfonshire to Newry, County Down.

== 25 September ==
List of shipwrecks: 25 September 1827
Ship	State	Description
Eliza	United Kingdom	The ship was wrecked at Cap Blanc, Morocco. She was on a voyage from Cork to Rio de Janeiro, Brazil. All on board, - the crew plus 314 passengers, were rescued.

== 28 September ==
List of shipwrecks: 28 September 1827
Ship	State	Description
Aleksandr (Александр)	Imperial Russian Navy	The brig was driven ashore and wrecked 1 kilometre (0.6 mi) from the mouth of the Bolshaya on Kamchatka. Her crew were rescued. She was on a voyage from Okhotsk to Petropavlovsk.

== Unknown date ==
List of shipwrecks: Unknown date in September 1827
Ship	State	Description
Huddersfield	United Kingdom	The ship was wrecked on the Haisborough Sands in early September.
William	United Kingdom	The ship was driven ashore in the Patuxent River. She was on a voyage from London to Baltimore, Maryland, United States.
Wohlfarth	Norway	The ship was lost off Skagen, Denmark before 24 September.
