= Albuera (1826 ship) =

History

United Kingdom
- Name: Albuera
- Namesake: Battle of Albuera
- Builder: Nicol Reid, Aberdeen
- Launched: 17 February 1826
- Fate: Wrecked 24 October 1829

General characteristics
- Tons burthen: 138 (bm)
- Length: 71 ft 5 in (21.8 m)
- Beam: 21 ft 0 in (6.4 m)
- Depth: 12 ft 9 in (3.9 m)

Albuera was launched at Aberdeen in 1826. An Argentine privateer seized her in late 1828 and she was detained until March 1829. She was wrecked on 24 October 1829.

== Career ==
Albuera appeared in the Register of Shipping in 1827 with Bothwic, master, Amesley & Co., owners, and trade London–Trieste. (Note: Charles Borthwick was both master and part-owner.) Albuera traded widely, reaching the Mediterranean, the Baltic, and South America.

On 28 February 1826 the "new brig Albuera of Aberdeen", Captain Borthwick, struck the point of Annet Sand while coming in to Montrose during a gale. She grounded, but was floated off at the next tide without damage.

On 1 February 1828 Felix, Campbell, master, arrived at Liverpool from Buenos Aires. On 27 January 1828 she had spoken Albuera at 16°20′N 88°7′W (off what is now Belize). At the time Albuera was actually a prize to the Argentine privateer General San Martin, under the command of Captain [Samuel] Adams. Argentina was at the time at war with the Empire of Brazil.

The privateer had seized Albuera on 23 December 1827, and put a prize crew aboard. She reached Patagonia on 19 January 1828; on 23 January Borthwick submitted a protest to Carmen de Patagones, headquarters of the Argentine commandant of Patagonia. On 21 July the prize court at Buenos Aires cleared Albuera. On 16 October Borthwick, still in Patagonia with Albuera, received the news that Albuera had been cleared. He could repossess her, minus the cargo of gunpowder she had been carrying. On 6 November Borthwick took possession of Albuera, under protest, and made repairs. Borthwick sailed Albuera on 26 December and reached Buenos Aires on 6 January 1829. There a second survey was ordered, which recommended the sale of her cargo. A third survey, on 20 February 1829, found that damages having been repaired, she was fit for any voyage and any cargo. Borthwick entered a protest in the Consular Register of the British Consulate in Buenos Aires on 2 March 1829. (Note: Negotiations in 1831 to 1834 between Argentine and British commissions resulted in the award of £857 to Albuera's owners in compensation.)

== Fate ==
On 24 October 1829 Albuera struck the Haisborough Sands, in the North Sea off the coast of Norfolk and sank. Her crew were rescued. She was on a voyage from Newcastle upon Tyne to Gibraltar. She had apparently struck some wreck on the Sands and sank in deep water; her crew was saved.
