= Albuera (1811 ship) =

History

United Kingdom
- Name: Albuera
- Namesake: Battle of Albuera
- Builder: Sunderland
- Launched: 1811
- Fate: Wrecked on 4 November 1827

General characteristics
- Tons burthen: 167, or 177 (bm)
- Armament: 2 guns

Albuera was launched at Sunderland in 1811. She was wrecked in November 1827.

She first appeared in Lloyd's Register (LR) in 1811 with J.Johnson, master, J.Lang, owner, trade London transport.

| Year | Master | Owner | Trade | Source |
|---|---|---|---|---|
| 1815 | C.Jameson | Saunders | London–Leghorn | LR |
| 1820 | C.Baltworth | Saunders | London | LR |
| 1823 | Borthwik | Saunders | London–Malta | LR |
| 1825 | P.M'Corton | M'Clarkson | Belfast–San Andero | LR |

A gale drove Albuera ashore near Memel, Prussia on 4 November 1827. The Memel Lifeboat rescued the crew. She was on a voyage from Belfast.
