= Líbero Badaró =

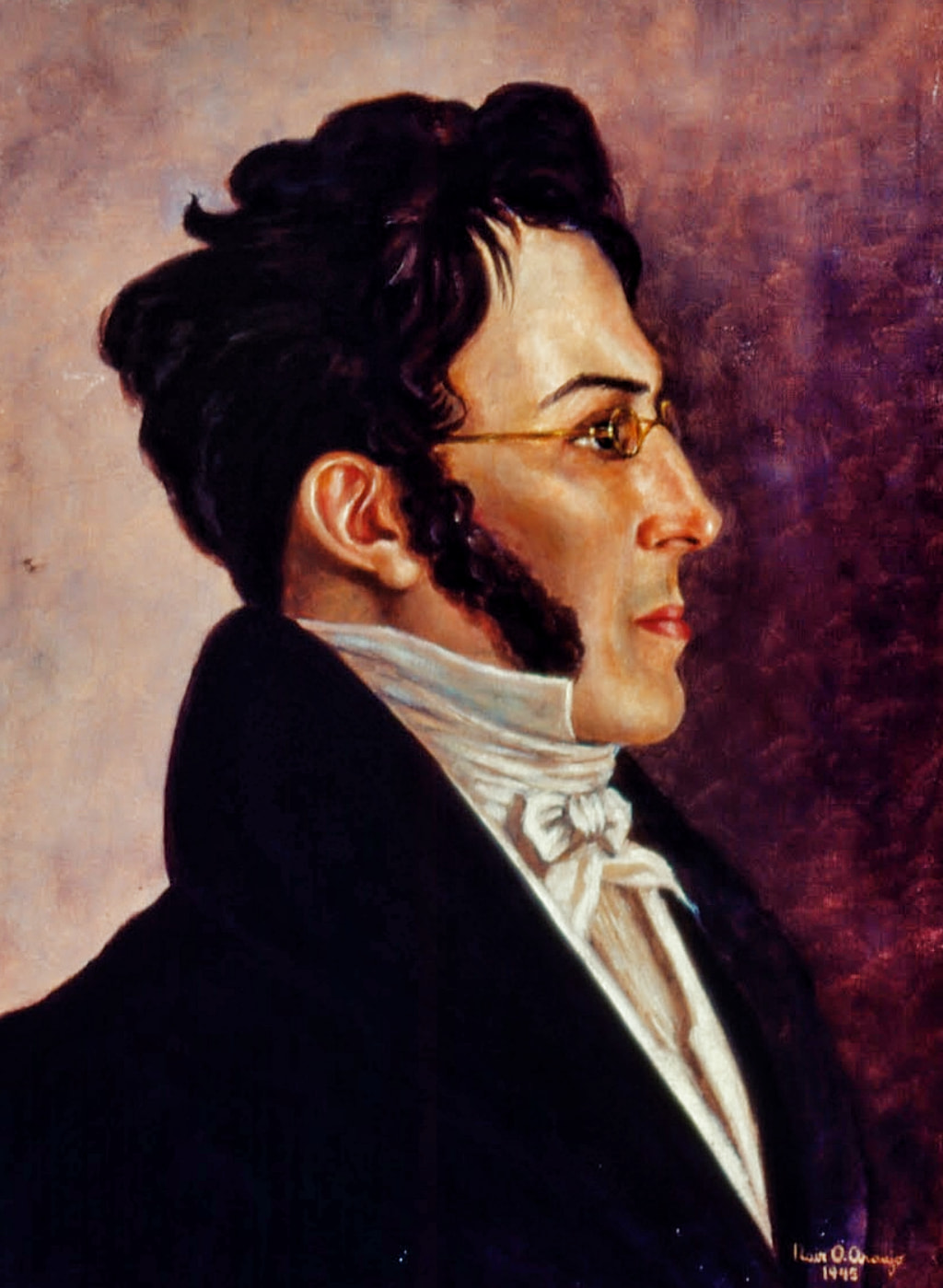
- Born: Giovanni Battista Líbero Badaró; 1798; Laigueglia, Liguria
- Died: 21 November 1830 (aged 31–32)
- Occupations: Journalist; botanist

Giovanni Battista Líbero Badaró (c. 1798 – 21 November 1830) was an Italian-born Brazilian medical doctor, botanist, journalist and politician.

== Biography ==
Badaró was born in Laigueglia, Liguria. He studied medicine at the University of Torino and at the University of Pavia. In 1826, he departed from Genoa and headed to Brazil, which had gained independence from Portugal a few years earlier.

He settled in the city of São Paulo, where in 1829 he founded the liberal newspaper O Observador Constitutional (The Constitutional Observer). He taught preparatory classes of geometry to applicants to the Faculty of Law of São Paulo. Badaró had republican tendencies and used his newspaper to criticise the authoritarian policies of emperor Pedro I. During a public demonstration of liberal students who were commemorating the July Revolution which had deposed King Charles X, Badaró was assassinated. The suspicions fell on Cândido Japiaçu, a member of the law courts, who felt he was being slandered by Badaró's paper. Japiaçu was tried but no accusations could be proved against him. Some historians think the assassination order came directly from the emperor, but there is no proof for that either.

A defender of liberalism, Badaró founded and wrote the newspaper O Observador Constitutional, which appeared in 1829, printed in the typography of the Farol Paulistano, at first under the direction of Badaró and Luís Monteiro d'Ornelas and, after the mid-1830s, under the exclusive direction of Badaró. The liberal newspaper had a moderate feature, like the one that Evaristo da Veiga printed in Rio de Janeiro, the Aurora Fluminense. Like this one, it soon gained wide publicity.

Badaró commented on the events of the 1830 revolution in Paris, whose news arrived in Rio de Janeiro on 14 September; the Three Day Revolution - in which Charles X was dethroned last July - urging the Brazilians to follow the example of the French. In his work, Armitage says: "the shock was electric. Many individuals in Rio, Bahia, Pernambuco, and São Paulo have illuminated their homes for this reason. The hopes of the liberals and the fear of the humps were excited, and these sensations spread throughout the Empire through the periodicals".

In São Paulo, the students of the Legal Course took the initiative. "Luminaires, bands and more demonstrations of joy practiced by the inhabitants of São Paulo for the overthrow of the tyrant and anti-constitutional government of France", as the Chamber of Constitutional Commission (as it appears in its Annals, 1830, tome II), assumed to the ombudsman Candido Ladislau Japiaçu criminal acts and led him to sue some protesters, preferably young students. O Observador Constitutional campaigned in favor of the accused and attacked Japiaçu, calling him Caligulazinho. The language was lively and energetic, but it would not justify the violent outcome.

Pedro I lost prestige with facts like this, which demonstrated his authoritarian stance, since the bourgeoisie that supported him in the process of independence wanted to get rid of control of Portugal.

== Death ==
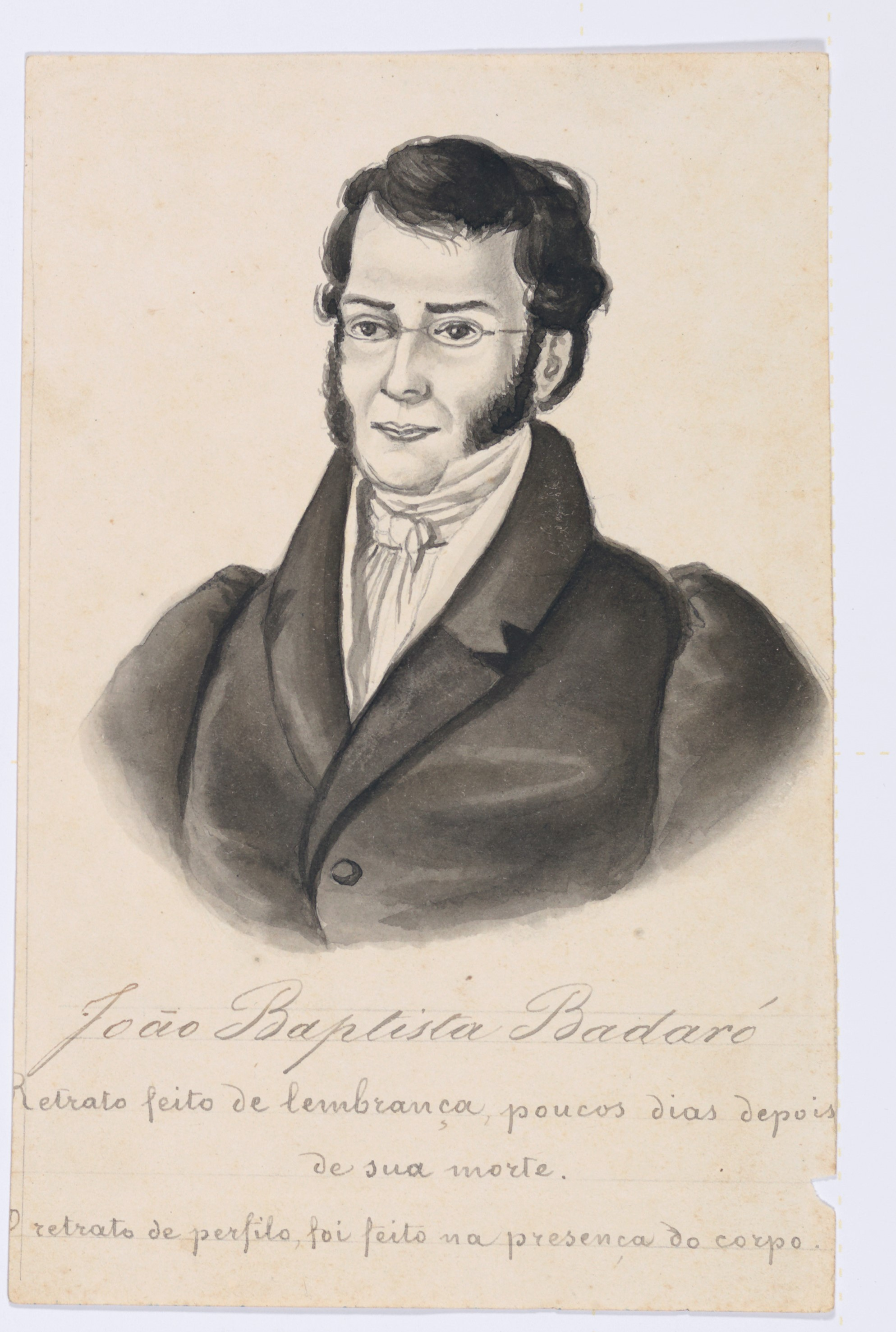
A portrait drawing made from memory a few days after his death by Hércules Florence, 1830

On 20 November 1830, at 10 o'clock at night, when Badaró was returning to his house in the São José street (later named Líbero Badaró in his honour), without realizing it was a trap, he was approached by four Germans on the pretext of handing him a letter from Cândido Japiaçu, but he treacherously received from them a charge of gurnard, falling mortally wounded.

It is believed that upon dying Badaró pronounced a phrase that was celebrated as a symbol of the defense of the freedom of the press:

"I die defending freedom", or yet "A liberal dies, but freedom does not".

The Constitutional Observer dedicated its 26 November issue to the death of its creator: "I die defending freedom, he said in his closing minutes". The repercussion in São Paulo was immediate. At his funeral 5,000 people attended and over 800 torches were lit, his last words were engraved on his tomb.

The main culprit in the attack was Henry (or Simon) Stock, a German who hid in the ombudsman's house. The people, who wanted summary justice, demanded the arrest of both. The German Stock was arrested, Japiaçu remained threatened and sought asylum from a colonel, authorities came in to make arrangements. The exaltation of the people continued and the Governing Council of the Province sent to Rio the ombudsman who was denounced under escort. Father Diogo Antônio Feijó , as a member of the Council, took an active part in the deliberations and his initiative were the main measures to seek punishment for the culprits. The German Stock was convicted of the murder, but Japiaçu the Caligulazinho was acquit

== Aftermath ==
His death caused a great public revolt and outcry, and the emperor was blamed. More than 5,000 people went to his funeral. This episode accelerated the end of the emperor's reign, leading a few months later to his abdication, on 7 April 1831, in favor of his son, Pedro II, who was only 5 years old, and the establishment of a regency to govern the country until Pedro II became of age.

Líbero Badaró is considered a martyr of press freedom. A few days after the proclamation of the republic in Brazil by general Deodoro da Fonseca, on 15 November 1889, Badaró was honoured by a public ceremony and his remains were transferred to another cemetery.

A journalism prize is named after him, as well as a street in São Paulo downtown (the old São José street, where he lived until his death).

The following year 1831, with his power already weakened, Dom Pedro I abdicated the crown, leaving it on the bed of his son and legitimate heir, Dom Pedro II, and returned to Portugal with the stepmother of the future emperor, who took over the crown and became the second emperor of Brazil, only 14 years old.

The offices were unpopular, though with men of valor sometimes. The prince, since the dissolution of the Ministry on 4 December 1829, when he had dismissed the Marquis of Barbacena, seemed incompatible with the constitutional system. The assassination of Libero Badarò made the environment more conducive to the most exalted liberals. He is honored in Sao Paulo with a street that bears his name, Líbero Badaró Street.

== Bibliography ==
- SILVA, Joaquim. PENNA, J. B. Damasco, 1967, "História do Brasil", Cia. Editora Nacional, São Paulo.
- AMARAL, Tancredo do, 1895, A História de São Paulo ensinada pela biographia dos seus vultos mais notáveis, Alves & Cia. Editores, 353 pp.
- GAETA, Augusto, 1944, "Libero Badaró", Estabelecimento Grafico E. Cupolo ,São Paulo.
- PREVE, Giulio Cesare, 1983, " Laigueglia, storia e cronache di um paese lígure" Ed. Associazione Vecchi Laigueglia
