= Domingo Ordoñana =

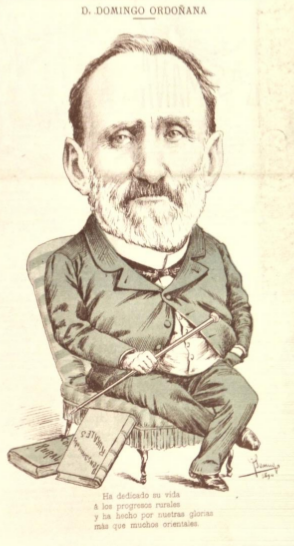
Drawing made by Juan Bellver under the pseudonym Juan Sanuy (1856 - 1908) of the Uruguayan merchant Domingo Ordoñana

Don Domingo Ordoñana (1829-1897), was a prominent rancher in Soriano Department in Uruguay.

== Patron of national commemorations ==
He was noted for patronizing works of national commemorative importance. These include a memorial obelisk to the landing of the Thirty-Three Orientals at Agraciada Beach.

He also hosted at his Casa Blanca ranch the distinguished artist Juan Manuel Blanes during the latter's execution of his major work depicting the oath of the Thirty-Three Orientals.

== Agricultural interests; death ==
Don Domingo was also noted for introducing various schemes of agricultural improvement.

He died in 1897 during a voyage to Spain.

== See also ==
- Thirty-Three Orientals#Landing
- Juan Manuel Blanes#Works of Uruguayan national importance
