= Battle of Sarandí =

1825 battle in Uruguay

- Part of the Cisplatine War
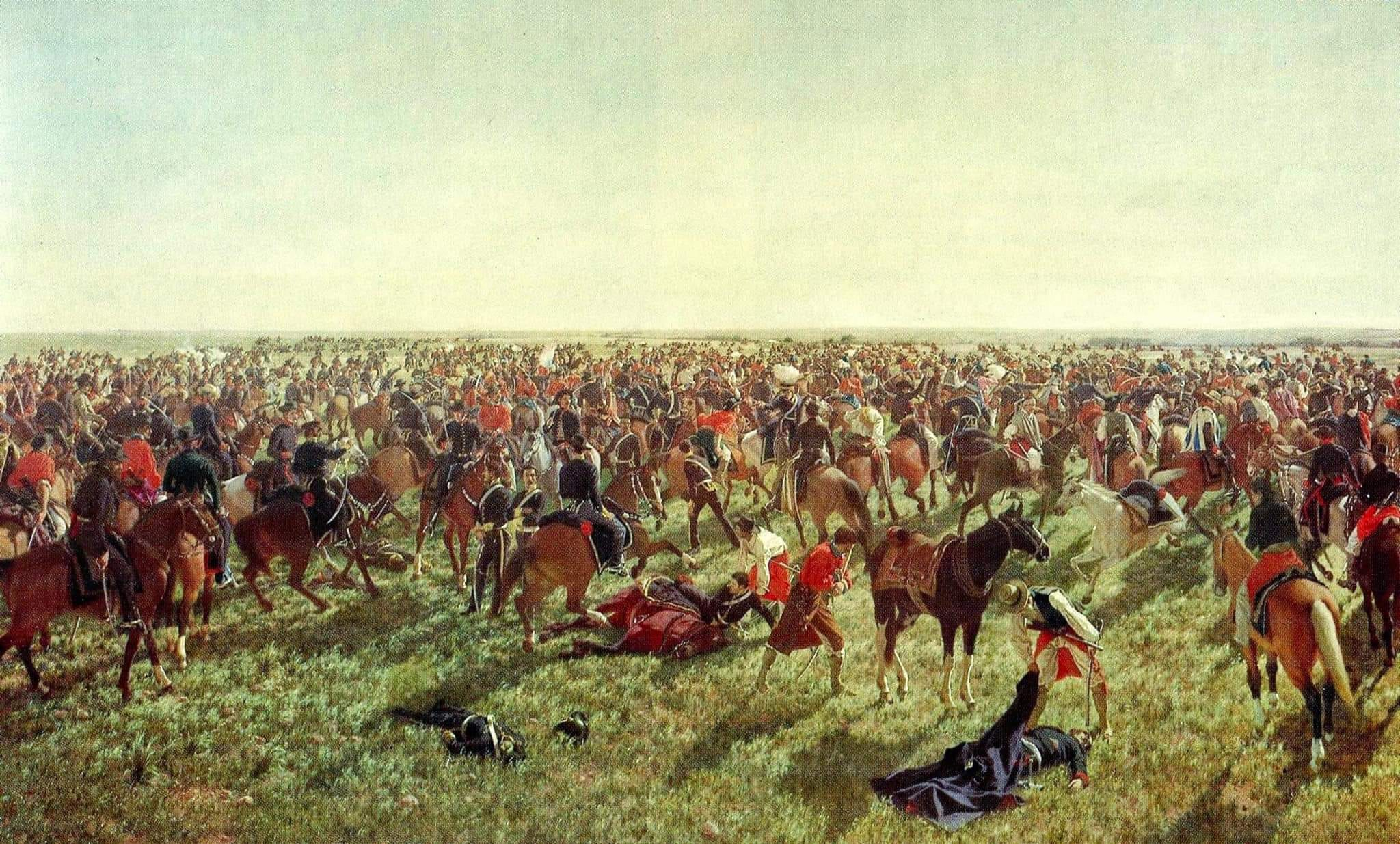
- Battle of Sarandí, oil by Juan Manuel Blanes
Date	12 October 1825
Location	Arroyo Sarandí, present-day Florida Department, Uruguay 33°40′15″S 56°17′27″W
Result	Oriental victory

Belligerents
Empire of Brazil	Banda Oriental

Commanders and leaders
Bento Manuel Ribeiro	Juan Antonio Lavalleja

Strength
1,411	2,200–2,600; 1 field gun

Casualties and losses
~200 killed 515–575 captured	35 killed 90 wounded
- Location within Uruguay

The Battle of Sarandí was fought on 12 October 1825, in the vicinity of the Arroyo Sarandí in Uruguay, between troops of the Banda Oriental (now Uruguay) and the Empire of Brazil. It resulted in a decisive victory for the Orientals.

== Background ==
The Banda Oriental was occupied by the United Kingdom of Portugal, Brazil and the Algarves in 1820 under the name of Cisplatina, and was incorporated as a Brazilian province in 1822 when Brazil became independent from Portugal. The Orientals resumed their efforts to get rid of foreign occupation and, after the landing of the Thirty-Three Orientals on 19 April 1825, engaged the Brazilian forces in a series of actions which included the Siege of Montevideo (8 May 1825), led by Manuel Oribe and that of Colonia del Sacramento (18 August 1825).

The Battle of Rincón (24 September 1825) resulted in a victory for the Oriental forces, and represented a major setback for the Brazilian forces besieged at Montevideo, as Brazilian casualties were high, which included about 6,000 horses captured by the Orientals. As soon as the news were known in Montevideo, a force of around 1,000 Brazilian soldiers under Colonel Bento Manuel Ribeiro was organized with the objective of joining a Brazilian army of similar strength that was in the field, led by General Bento Gonçalves da Silva.

Juan Antonio Lavalleja was in Durazno with Oriental troops, and after becoming aware of this news, tried, unsuccessfully, to prevent the two Brazilian forces from joining up. With a major effort Lavalleja was able to muster a force of similar strength, and faced the Brazilian army at the tips of the Sarandí creek, in an area located in what is now the Florida Department, on 12 October 1825.

== The battle ==
General Juan Antonio Lavalleja, leader and commander of the Oriental forces.

On the morning of the 12th, after arriving to the vicinity of Sarandí creek, Lavalleja was informed that the enemy was a league away. Lavalleja formed his troops in a battle line facing south, occupying the heights overlooking the road to Paso de Polanco del Yí. The forces under Fructuoso Rivera were placed to the left of Lavalleja’s, supporting their flank the Sarandí creek; those led by Pablo Zufriategui were in the center, while on the right wing were located the troops led by Manuel Oribe. The reserves were located behind the centre.

Meanwhile, the Imperial troops had reached Sarandi del Yí, and believing that Rivera was on the right bank of the Sarandí creek were surprised to see them the other side. After crossing the stream and reaching higher ground, the Brazilians realized that the whole of the Oriental force was formed in the line of battle. Bento Manuel Ribeiro realized the advantage of the Oriental formation, and rather than attacking realigned his forces. The manoeuver of the Brazilian Army put Lavalleja off balance, forcing him to change his front from the south to the west, but the speed with which the maneuver was carried out caused confusion in the line, leaving Zufriategui in the center and Manuel Oribe at the right.

At 8 in the morning the action began. The Oriental artillery began opening fire; and Ribeiro ordered the Brazilian Army to attack. Rivera charged on Bento Gonçalves, while in the center Oribe was suddenly charged by the Imperial forces of Alvaro de Alencastre whose disciplined troops penetrated the front and reached the Oriental reserves; this manoeuvre could have been fatal to the Oriental forces. Realizing the danger, Lavalleja charged with the reserve forces against the Brazilians and divided their formation in two. The Oriental right wing charged against the Brazilian left wing, which was trying to support the Brazilian centre. As a result, Alencastre’s forces were flanked by Rivera’s troops and by the Oriental reserves, which were in pursuit of the scattered troops under Gonçalves Bentos. This allowed Oribe to reorganize its forces and counterattack. The confusion of the Brazilian troops was huge and caused its dispersion, as they suddenly found themselves charged by the Oriental cavalry, who forced the Imperial troops to leave the battlefield and relentlessly pursued the enemy.

== Aftermath ==
The Orientals organised the Congress of Florida and requested reunification with the United Provinces of the River Plate. The General Congress which gathered in the city of Buenos Aires approved on 24 October a law that reunited the Banda Oriental to the United Provinces of Rio de la Plata. Regardless, the Brazilian army retained the northeast of the country, allowing it to keep in touch with its metropolis.

For this reason, the Orientals took action to regain control of this area, culminating in the capture of the Fortress of Santa Teresa on 31 December 1825 which was located in the Rocha Department, near the present border with Brazil.

From then on the Brazilian forces held only the besieged cities of Colonia and Montevideo.

Currently the small town close to the battlefield is called Sarandí Grande.
