= Ombú (disambiguation) =

Ombú (Phytolacca dioica) is a massive evergreen tree native to the Pampa of South America, belonging to the order Caryophyllales

Ombú may also refer to:

- El Ombú, a Mennonite settlement in Río Negro Department, Uruguay
- El Ombú, a poem by Argentine politician Luis Lorenzo Domínguez
- El Ombú, stories by Anglo-Argentine naturalist William Henry Hudson
- Cañada Ombú, a populated place in Vera Department, province of Santa Fe, Argentina
- Cuchilla del Ombú, a village in Tacuarembó Department, Uruguay
- Battle of Ombú, a military conflict in South America in 1827
- Ombu, a village in Tibet
