= Cisplatine War =

1825–1828 war between Brazil and the United Provinces of the Río de la Plata

- Part of the Platine Wars
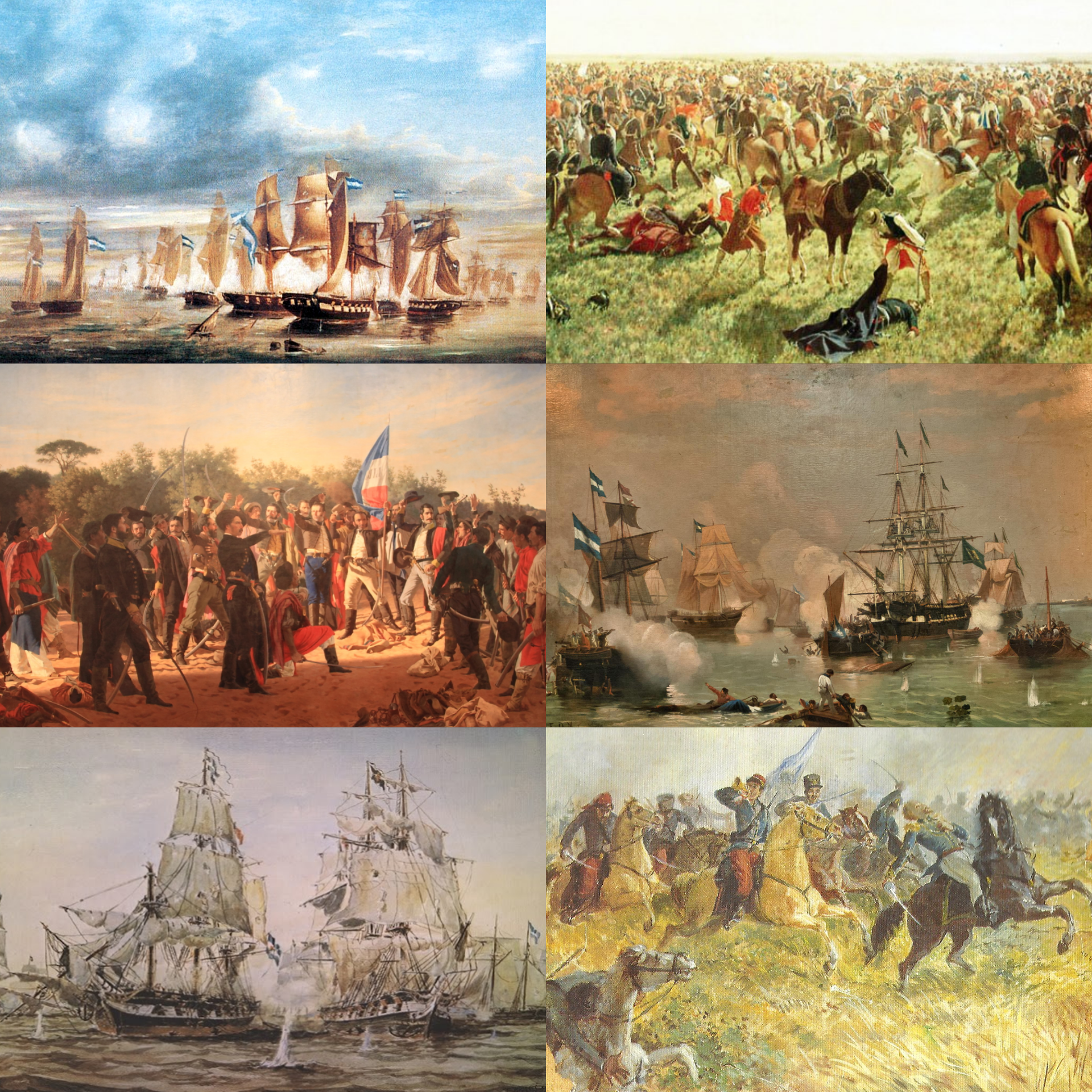
- From top left: Battle of Juncal; Battle of Sarandí; Oath of the Thirty-Three Orientals; Battle of Monte Santiago; Battle of Quilmes; Battle of Ituzaingó
Date	10 December 1825 – 27 August 1828 (2 years, 8 months, 2 weeks and 3 days)
Location	Present day Uruguay, Southern Brazil, and Argentina
Result	Preliminary Peace Convention
Territorial changes	Cisplatina becomes independent as Uruguay (Note: Articles I and II of the Preliminary Peace Convention, Câmara dos Deputados 1828, p. 121: Article I: "His Majesty the Emperor of Brazil declares the Province of Montevideo—currently known as Cisplatina—separated from the territory of the Empire of Brazil, so that it may constitute itself as a State free and independent of any and all nations, under the form of government it deems most suitable to its interests, needs, and resources".; Article II: "The Government of the Republic of the United Provinces of the Río de la Plata agrees to declare, on its part, the independence of the Province of Montevideo—currently known as Cisplatina—and agrees to its constitution as a free and independent State, in the manner declared in the preceding article".)

Belligerents
Empire of Brazil	United Provinces

Commanders and leaders
Pedro I; Marquess of Barbacena; Viscount of Laguna; Gustav von Braun; Sebastião Barreto; Bento Manuel; Bento Gonçalves; Baron of Rio da Prata; James Norton	Bernardino Rivadavia; Manuel Dorrego; Carlos María de Alvear; Martín Rodríguez; Juan Lavalle; William Brown; Juan Antonio Lavalleja; Fructuoso Rivera; Manuel Oribe

Units involved
Imperial Army; Imperial Navy	Argentine Army; Argentine Navy

Strength
1826: 6,832 regulars 1828: 15,000	1826: ~12,000 regulars & militia 1828: 6,000

The Cisplatine War (Note: Portuguese: Guerra Cisplatina. Also known as the Argentine-Brazilian War (Spanish: Guerra argentino-brasileña) or, in Argentine and Uruguayan historiography, as the Brazil War (Spanish: Guerra del Brasil), the War against the Empire of Brazil (Spanish: Guerra contra el Imperio del Brasil), or the Liberating Crusade (Spanish: Cruzada Libertadora) in Uruguay.) was an armed conflict fought in the 1820s between the Empire of Brazil and the United Provinces of the Río de la Plata over control of the Banda Oriental following its annexation by Brazil as the Cisplatina province. It was fought in the aftermath of the United Provinces' and Brazil's independence from Spain and Portugal, respectively, and resulted in the independence of Cisplatina as the Oriental State of Uruguay.

In 1816, the United Kingdom of Portugal, Brazil and the Algarves carried out an invasion of the Banda Oriental and, after defeating the local resistance led by José Gervasio Artigas, annexed it under the name of Cisplatina. After Brazil's independence in 1822, Cisplatina remained as part of Brazil. Wishing to gain control of the region, the United Provinces sent a diplomatic mission to Brazil in 1823 to negotiate a peaceful Brazilian withdrawal, but it failed. In 1825, a group of patriots known as the Thirty-Three Orientals, supported by the Argentine government and led by Juan Antonio Lavalleja, launched a rebellion against Brazil. On 25 August of that year, in the Congress of Florida, they declared Cisplatina's independence from Brazil and its unification with the United Provinces. After a series of initial skirmishes, they defeated the Brazilians at the battles of Rincón and Sarandí, prompting the Argentine Congress to proclaim Cisplatina reintegrated into the United Provinces on 25 October. In response, Brazil declared war on the United Provinces on 10 December 1825 and imposed a naval blockade on the River Plate.

The United Provinces managed to occupy the Uruguayan countryside with the help of the local insurgents, however, its forces never managed to capture Montevideo and Colonia del Sacramento or penetrate deeply into Brazilian territory. Likewise, the Brazilians did not manage to regain control of the countryside or achieve a decisive victory in order to repel the Argentines, with both armies clashing at the battle of Ituzaingó, the largest battle of the conflict. Thus, the war on land reached an impasse. At sea, however, the Brazilian Navy obtained better results, despite the Argentine resistance, whose small fleet, led by Irish-born admiral William Brown, was mostly destroyed.

The economic burden and internal political disputes caused by the war in both states, especially the naval blockade and the stalemate on land, led both countries to start peace negotiations. In 1827, the Argentine minister plenipotentiary Manuel José García, exceeding his instructions, signed a peace treaty with Brazilian representatives, renouncing Argentine claims over Cisplatina and agreeing to compensate Brazil for privateering losses. The treaty was rejected by Argentine president Bernardino Rivadavia, but its terms generated enormous backlash, contributing to the president's resignation. The national presidency was dissolved and Manuel Dorrego was elected governor of Buenos Aires. Dorrego continued the war while assuming responsibility for the conduct of the United Provinces' foreign affairs. The conflict continued until 27 August 1828, when Argentine and Brazilian representatives, under British mediation, signed the Preliminary Peace Convention, by which Cisplatina would become an independent state and hostilities would cease.

After the war, tensions in Argentina between the Federalists and the Unitarians increased. A Federalist, Manuel Dorrego was deposed and executed by the Unitarian general Juan Lavalle, reigniting the conflict between the two factions. In Brazil, the war's financial cost, aggravated by the damage done to Brazilian trade by Argentine privateers, and the loss of Cisplatina, added to the internal political disputes surrounding emperor Pedro I, which ultimately led him to abdicate the throne in favour of his 5-year-old son Pedro II in 1831, ushering the regency period.

== Background ==
=== Colonial disputes ===
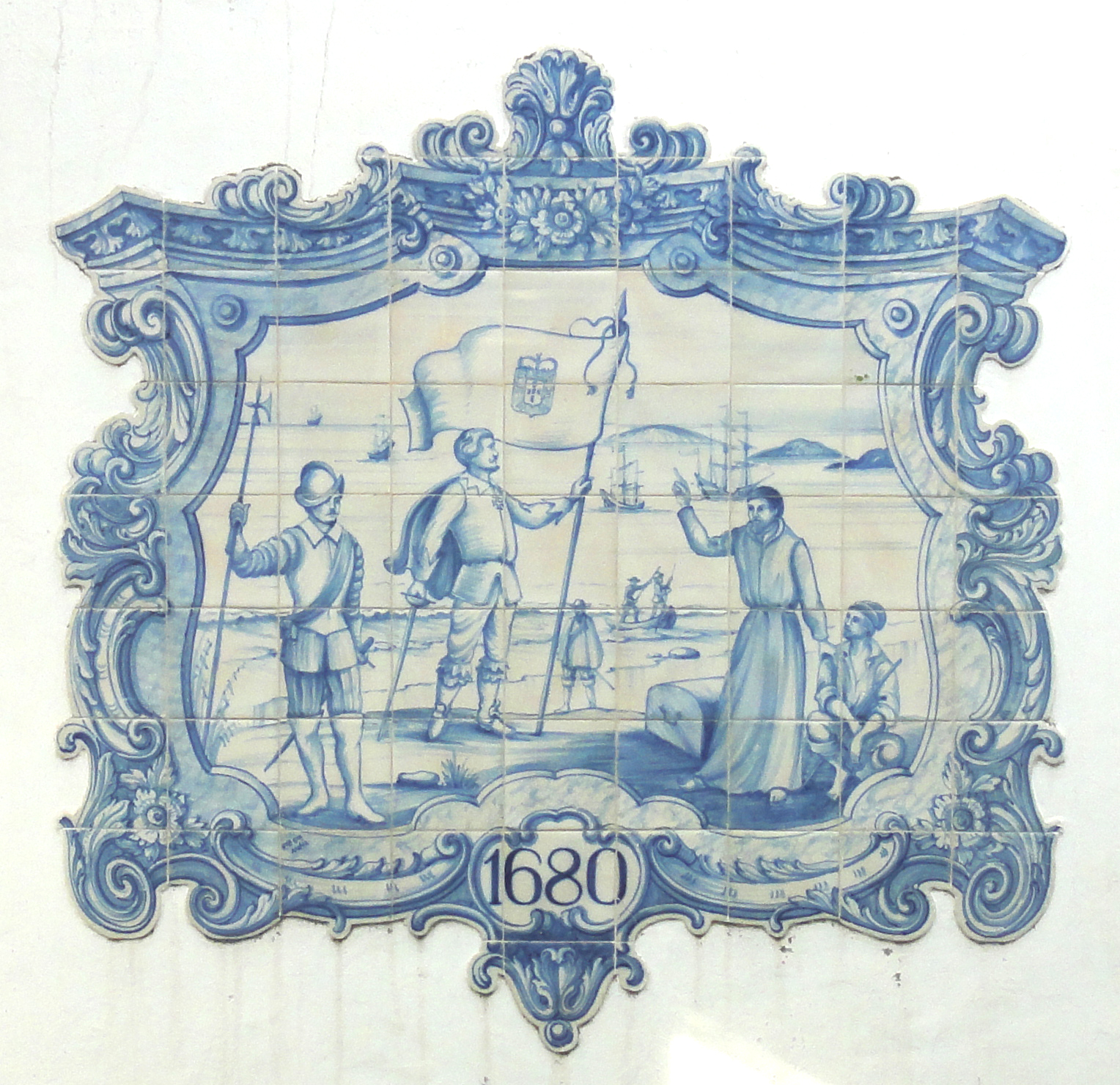
Azulejo depicting the founding of Colônia do Sacramento by the Portuguese in 1680

Following the South American wars of independence, the region known as the Banda Oriental became a point of contention between the Empire of Brazil and the United Provinces after Brazil's independence in 1822. This dispute was inherited from the Portuguese and Spanish colonial empires, whose borders in the River Plate basin had never been settled. It began in 1679, when the Portuguese crown, which had always considered the River Plate as Brazil's natural southern border, ordered Manuel Lobo, the governor of the Captaincy of Rio de Janeiro, to found the fortress town of Colônia do Sacramento, in an easily defensible peninsula with a natural harbour, on the right bank of the river, right in front of Buenos Aires, which he effectively did in 1680. By expanding into the River Plate basin, the Portuguese wanted to secure access to the continent's interior and also divert the smuggling of silver from Upper Peru away from Buenos Aires.

The Spaniards, wishing to solidify their control over the region, also founded a colony on the opposite bank of the river in 1724, when Bruno Mauricio de Zabala founded the town of Montevideo. Finally, Spain created the Viceroyalty of the Río de la Plata in 1776, with its capital in Buenos Aires. After centuries of wars and settling attempts between the two empires, Colônia do Sacramento finally became a Spanish possession by the 1801 Treaty of Badajoz.

With the outbreak of the 1810 May Revolution in Buenos Aires and the Argentine struggle for independence that ensued, Montevideo, under the command of viceroy Francisco Javier de Elío, remained loyal to Spain. The Primera Junta of Buenos Aires then set out to subdue Montevideo and Elío, who, finding himself without support from Europe, requested assistance from Carlota Joaquina, the Spanish wife of Portuguese prince regent John of Braganza. The Portuguese crown, which had fled to Brazil in 1808 after the French invasion of Portugal, then took the opportunity to invade the Banda Oriental in 1811. An army named "Peacekeeping Army of the Banda Oriental" was assembled and command was given to Diogo de Sousa, who had orders to help Elío. Diogo de Sousa then led the troops into the Banda Oriental, but a few months later, on 20 October 1811, Elío signed the Treaty of Pacification with the First Triumvirate, which had succeeded the Primera Junta, and so the Argentines, led by José Rondeau, lifted the siege on Montevideo and left the Banda Oriental. Likewise, the Portuguese signed an armistice with Buenos Aires on 26 May 1812 and also left the region.

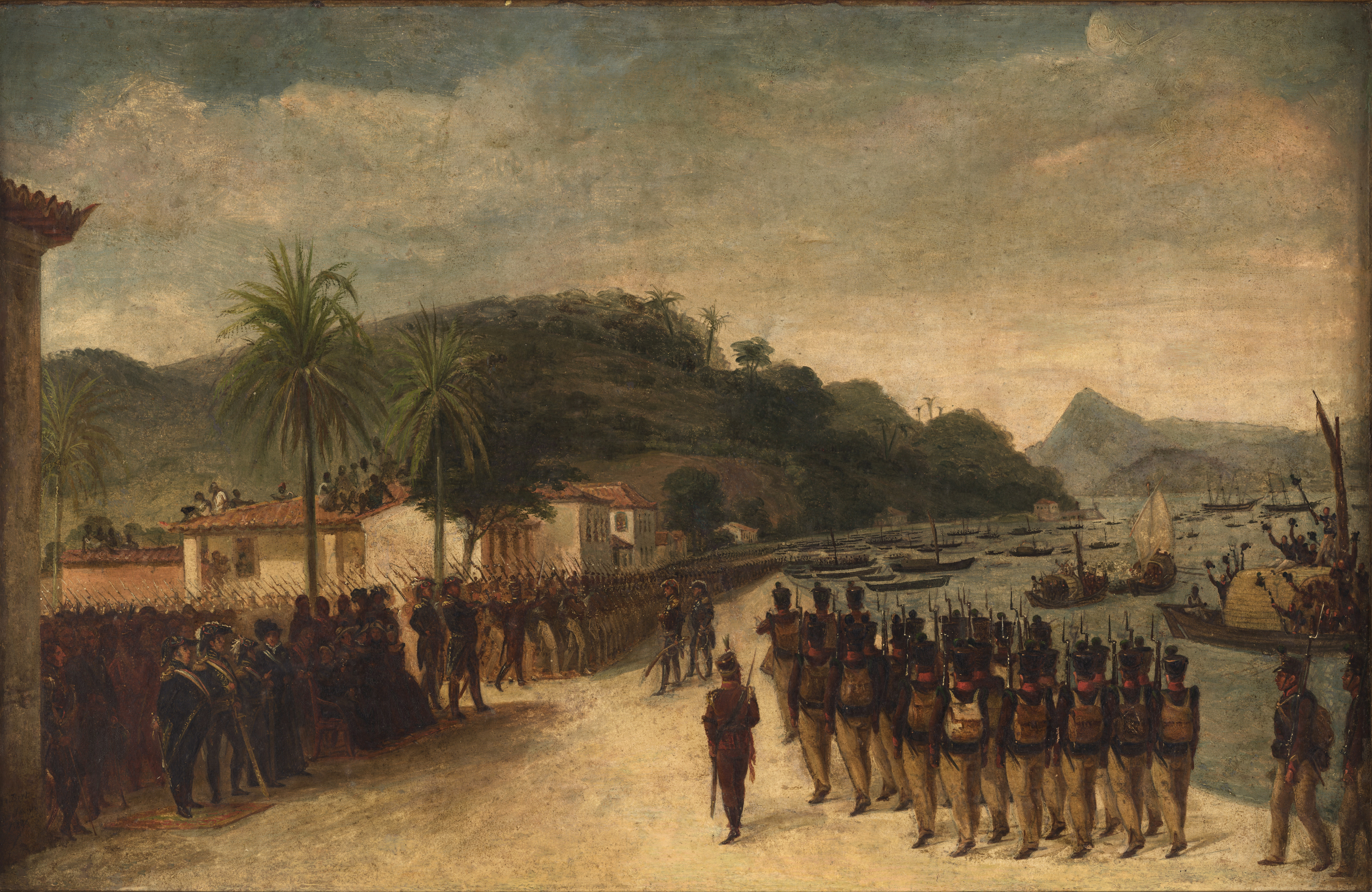
The Division of Royal Volunteers parading in Praia Grande before embarking to Montevideo, by Jean-Baptiste Debret

In this struggle for control over the region, José Gervasio Artigas, a native of the Banda Oriental who had defeated the Spanish at the battle of Las Piedras in 1811, opposed the treaty; Artigas left the Banda Oriental with 16 thousand people, in what became known as the Oriental Exodus, and continued to fight against Spanish rule. In 1814, Artigas, who had fought for independence alongside Buenos Aires troops since 1810, finally defeated the last Spanish forces in the region. Despite receiving military assistance from Buenos Aires in the independence war, Artigas opposed the Buenos Aires elites' intention of centralizing power and resisted their attempts to take control of the Banda Oriental, defeating Manuel Dorrego at the battle of Guayabos in 1815 and forming the League of the Free Peoples. This league was based on federalism and social reform, which gained him the support of the poor peoples of the countryside; thus, Artigas became an obstacle to Buenos Aires' political ambitions.

Artigas also opposed Portuguese intentions of asserting control over the region, and attacked the neighboring Brazilian province of Rio Grande do Sul near Quaraí. His influence was also felt in the north, inhabited by Brazilians. In the account of John Parish Robertson, the Banda Oriental fell into "the most unbridled disorder and horrible anarchy" and Artigas' name became "synonymous with bandit, murderer and thief"; this was the pretext now king John VI needed to once again invade the region in 1816. The new invasion, led by Carlos Frederico Lecor, was instigated and unopposed by Buenos Aires, who feared Artigas. (Note: According to Doratioto 2009, pp. 219–220, the invasion "was not opposed by Buenos Aires, because, although [it] meant a loss of territory that would potentially be subordinate to them, on the other hand it contributed to strengthening the power of the Buenos Aires authorities to the extent that it put an end to the Artiguist project, an alternative to centralization".) The invading Luso-Brazilian forces repeatedly defeated Artigas and his men, with Lecor conquering Montevideo on 20 January 1817. Artigas still unsuccessfully tried to resist, being finally defeated at the battle of Tacuarembó in 1820; with no hopes of continuing the resistance, he went into exile in Paraguay, where he spent the rest of his life as a prisoner of Paraguayan dictator José Gaspar Rodríguez de Francia.

=== Brazilian rule and failure of negotiations ===
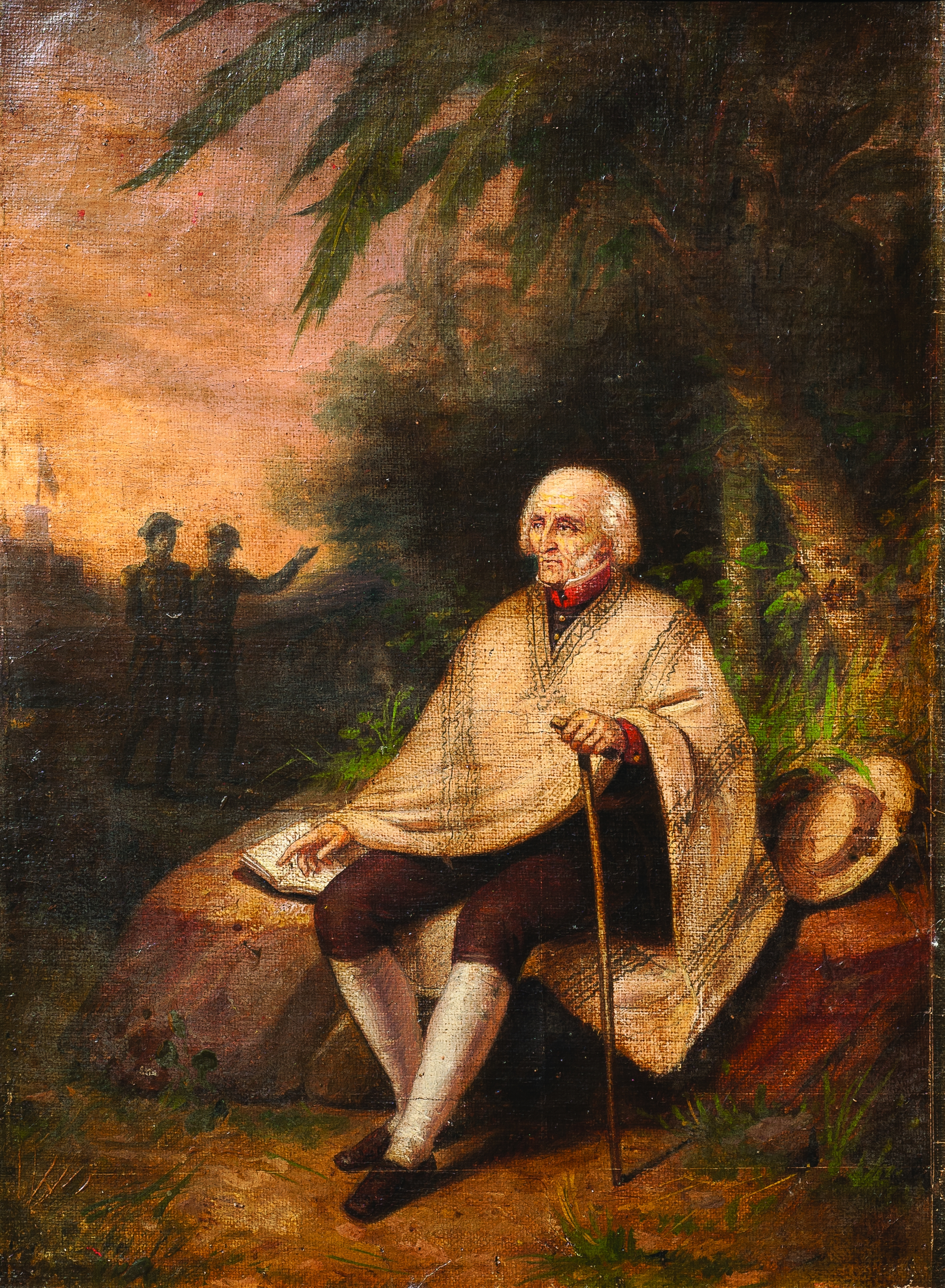
Artigas in Paraguay, by Eduardo Carbajal (attributed)

On 10 April 1821, under orders of King John VI, Lecor convened a congress of elected representatives from all of the Banda Oriental that would deliberate on their fate. A few months later, on 31 July 1821, the Montevideo cabildo approved its incorporation into the United Kingdom of Portugal, Brazil and the Algarves as a province under the name of Cisplatina. (Note: According to Rio Branco 2012, pp. 93–94, upon being incorporated, Cisplatina's limits with neighboring Rio Grande do Sul were set as the Quaraí and Chuí rivers.) According to Carlos Oberacker, the decision reflected the local population's exhaustion and desire for peace "after years of bloody civil war and anarchy, as well as the perpetual state of revolution in which Spanish America—and the Río de la Plata region in particular—found itself," whereas union with the monarchy offered "tranquility and economic prosperity hitherto unknown to them". Accession to the United Kingdom would take place under the indispensable condition that "the bases presented be respected, fulfilled, observed, and enforced"—notably the desire to make Cisplatina a federated state of the kingdom. Upon assuming the provincial government, Lecor gained the support of a local elite group known as the "Baron's Club". According to Pablo Ferreira, for them the new leadership represented a "guarantee of economic recovery, respect for property rights, and the gradual modernization of institutions". They benefited from the new land policy, public offices, and marriage alliances between Luso-Brazilian officers and women from the local elite.

The following year, when prince Pedro of Branganza openly rebelled against the Portuguese Cortes, the Brazilian government juntas in the provinces gradually joined the independence cause, with the exception of Cisplatina, whose junta, led by Portuguese-born Álvaro da Costa, voted to remain loyal to Portugal. (Note: Lecor voted in favor of Brazil; in his justification, Álvaro da Costa declared that "[c]onquered by Portuguese weapons, this province shall not detach itself from the Portuguese cause to follow the fate of Brazil", Carneiro 1946, p. 34. Apart from Cisplatina, in the south, the northern provinces of Grão-Pará, Maranhão, Piauí, Ceará and part of Bahia also remained loyal to Portugal, having to be militarily subjugated in the Brazilian War of Independence that followed through, Fundação Alexandre de Gusmão 2022, pp. 33–34.) Brazilian patriots, loyal to prince Pedro and under the command of Carlos Frederico Lecor, then besieged and blockaded the Portuguese troops garrisoned in Montevideo, finally defeating them in 1824. The local population was divided on the matter; many notable natives of the province, such as Fructuoso Rivera and Juan Antonio Lavalleja, joined Lecor against the Portuguese, while others, such as Manuel Oribe, sided with Portugal; the towns and villages of the countryside, such as Colônia do Sacramento, San José, Cerro Largo and Maldonado, had also joined the Brazilian cause. Thus, once the Portuguese were defeated and left to Lisbon, Cisplatina remained as part of the Empire of Brazil.

Following the United Province's recognition of Brazil's independence on 25 June 1823, the country immediately began diplomatic talks with the Empire regarding Cisplatina, which the Argentine government considered theirs and wanted to gain possession of. In 1823, the Argentines sent José Valentín Gómez to the Brazilian court in Rio de Janeiro in order to negotiate a peaceful Brazilian withdrawal from the region. The Argentine diplomatic mission made a series of proposals and, after receiving no response from the Brazilian government, demanded a reply in February 1824. The answer was given on 6 February 1824, in which the Imperial government promptly rejected any negotiations regarding the cession of Cisplatina.

Emperor Pedro I of Brazil, who had been informed of the situation in Cisplatina by Lecor, believed the natives of the province wanted to remain as part of the Empire; however, Lecor had surrounded himself with people who were sympathetic to Brazil, which prevented him from knowing the true intentions of the province's inhabitants. Likewise, after the Brazilian patriots defeated the Portuguese and entered Montevideo, the locals swore the Brazilian Constitution on 10 May 1824, by which Cisplatina would become part of Brazil, "subject only to the terms of the Province's incorporation". This situation gave off the impression the inhabitants of the province wanted to be part of the Empire. In reality, however, this was not the case: apart from Montevideo and other small cities along the coast, all the countryside, where Artigas' influence was still strong, wished for independence, with the locals disguising their intentions. (Note: Their goals varied, some wanted to join the United Provinces while others simply wanted independence, Carneiro 1946, p. 37.)

According to Pedro Calmon, the province had sent two deputies to the 1823 Constituent Assembly that was tasked with drafting Brazil's first constitution. The constitution drafted by the Assembly was rejected by emperor Pedro I, who dissolved it and issued a constitution himself in 1824. The draft provided for treating Cisplatina as a federated entity of the Empire. In any case, Oberacker Jr. emphasized that the Empire of Brazil did not treat Cisplatina as a sui generis state, ultimately treating it like any other province of the empire while retaining its military government—unlike the other Brazilian provinces, which "were already administered by civilian authorities", further souring their relations.

=== The Oriental rebellion ===
==== Landing of the Thirty-Three Orientals ====
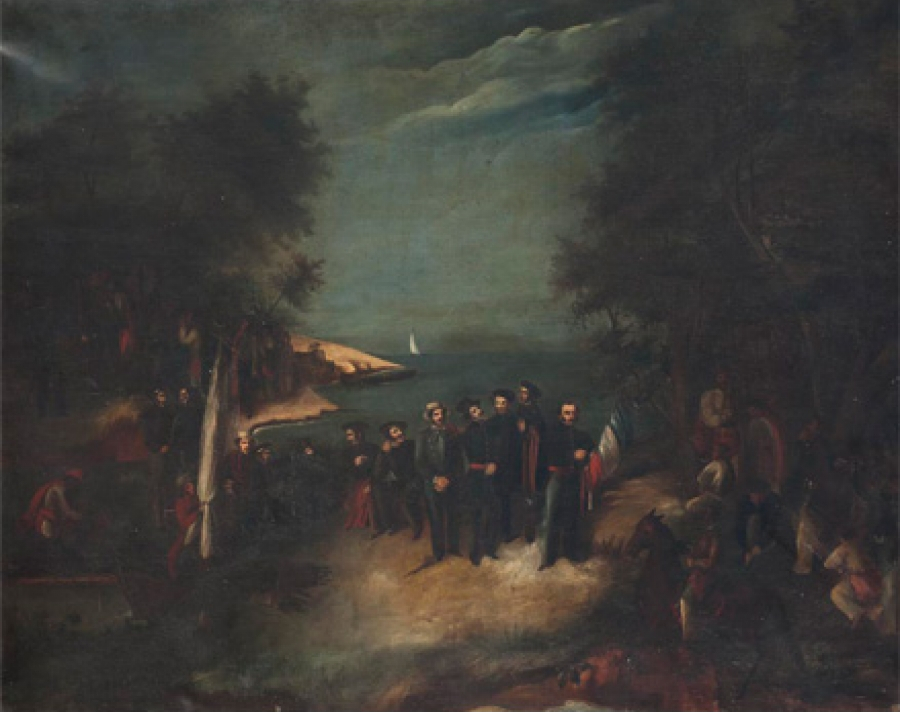
The landing of the Thirty-Three Orientales [Uruguayans] on Agraciada beach, by Josefa Palacios

When news of the Argentine diplomatic mission's failure reached Montevideo, the locals, including various of the notable leaders who had previously fought alongside the Brazilians against the Portuguese, started to conspire against Brazilian rule, wishing to unite with the United Provinces and forming a secret society named Caballeros Orientales. The conspiracy was discovered by Lecor and some of the more prominent conspirators had to flee to Buenos Aires. (Note: Notably Juan Antonio Lavalleja, who would later lead the insurgents against Brazil. Lavalleja had fought against the Luso-Brazilian invasion, but was captured in 1818 and imprisoned for three years at Ilha das Cobras, Rio de Janeiro, being released in 1821, Carneiro 1946, pp. 38–39.) Among the conspirators, who numbered more than two hundred people, was Fructuoso Rivera, who was a colonel in the Brazilian Army. Despite having distinguished himself in the service of the Empire and having received several promises of career advancement, Rivera decided to revolt, but continued to disguise his intentions from the Brazilian Court. (Note: Rivera published a manifesto, dated 13 February 1825, in which he declared he would defend Cisplatina's incorporation into Brazil "with the good faith incumbent on a man of honour, and a soldier". According to Armitage, the message was insincere, but still managed to "remove the suspicions of the Court of Rio", Armitage 1836, p. 215.)

On 19 April 1825, a group of 33 men known as the Treinta y Tres, or the Thirty-Three, (Note: According to Carneiro 1946, pp. 38–39, they were: Manuel Oribe, Pablo Zufriátegui, Simon del Pino, Manuel Lavalleja, Manuel Freire, Jacinto Trapani, Gregorio Sanabria, Manuel Meléndez, Atanasio Sierra, Santiago Gadea, Pantaleón Artigas, Andres Spikerman, Juan Spikerman, Celedonio Rojas, Andres Cheveste, Juan Ortiz, Ramón Ortiz, Avelino Miranda, Carmelo Colman, Santiago Nievas, Miguel Martínez, Juan Rosas, Tiburcio Gómez, Ignacio Núñez, Juan Acosta, José Leguizamon, Francisco Romero, Juan Arteaga, Dionisio Oribe and Juaquim Artigas, including Juan Antonio Lavalleja and two rowers. Out of the 33, 16 were foreigners: 11 Argentines, 1 French, 1 Brazilian, 1 Paraguayan and 2 Africans.) led by Juan Antonio Lavalleja, left Buenos Aires, crossed the Uruguay River and landed on Agraciada beach with arms and ammunition, starting the rebel movement against the Empire of Brazil; the action had Rivera's knowledge and collusion. After landing, Lavalleja and his men set out in search of recruits. The next day, the patriots, already numbering more than 200 men, marched to Soriano and defeated the small garrison there, which was commanded by Julián Laguna, who joined them. People from every corner of the province began to take up arms and present themselves to the patriots. According to John Armitage, a foreign observer present at the time, the insurgents were few in number, but superior to their opponents when on horseback, also having "a perfect knowledge of the face of the country".

==== Rivera's defection and first actions ====
When news of Soriano's fall reached Lecor, he ordered Rivera to attack it. After leaving Colonia del Sacramento to confront the rebels, Rivera was imprisoned by them without resisting, defecting to their side on 27 April. (Note: Rivera's action was qualified by Brazilian historian David Carneiro as a betrayal of those who previously considered him a friend, Carneiro 1946, p. 41. Uruguayan historian Washington Lockhart says, on the other hand, that the defection was not "spontaneous and unconditional", mentioning that, when captured by Lavalleja, Rivera begged for his life. Still according to Lockhart, Rivera's defection was "unworthily" called "the embrace of Monzon" by politicized historians, Lockhart 1996, p. 22.) On 1 May, Rivera, whose defection was still unknown to the Brazilian Army, went from Monzon to San José, where he met Brazilian colonel Vicente Rodrigues Borba, who, having arrived there with troops from Curitiba and São Paulo, was to join forces with Rivera. Unaware of Rivera's defection, Borba went to meet him, at which point he and his entire column of 300 men were captured by Lavalleja.

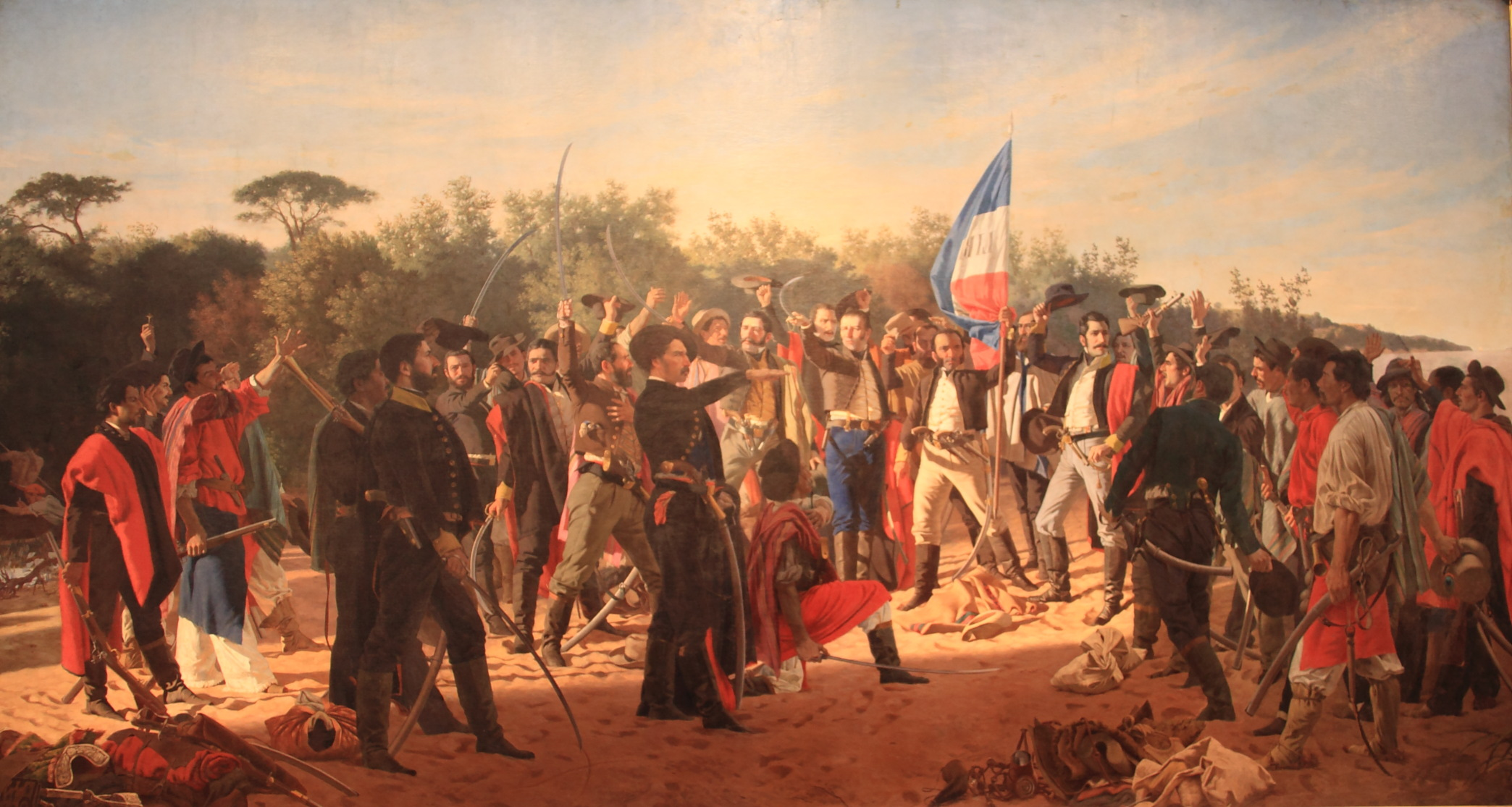
The Oath of the Thirty-Three Orientals, by Juan Manuel Blanes

Upon learning of Rivera's defection, the Brazilian government sent two thousand men and a fleet under admiral Rodrigo Ferreira Lobo to the River Plate in July 1825 in order to request the Argentines to abstain from further aiding the rebels and to recall "their subjects", otherwise his imperial majesty would "repel force by force". The Argentine government replied that it had no part in the rebellion and that "the supplies furnished from Buenos Aires had been bought either with the money, or on the credit, of private individuals in the stores of the city, which were open to all alike, whether friends or enemies". Despite this, they were covertly supporting the rebels and, as time passed, it became increasingly apparent that the message was insincere. In Carranza's words, the insurgents' "crusade" was "generously supported by donations from Argentines and Orientals [Uruguayans]".

On 14 June, the Oriental patriots installed a provisional government in Florida. By now their numbers had increased considerably: Lavalleja, commander of the army, was at the head of 1,000 men. Rivera commanded an equal force in Durazno, while Manuel Oribe and Quirós commanded 300 men each. The Orientals then laid siege to Colonia del Sacramento and Montevideo. On 15 July, Brazilian colonel Vasco Antunes Maciel routed the besiegers at Colonia. Three days later, Oribe attacked Montevideo at night, but was repelled. On 17 August, a new battle took place near Colonia del Sacramento, when colonel João Ramos, at the head of 300 Brazilians, fought against 400 Orientals, who, after a fierce combat, retreated with considerable losses. On 22 August, Rivera attacked the town of Mercedes with 500 men, being repelled. According to David Carneiro, the patriots' goal was always to fight on open field due to the superiority of their cavalry, but, whenever that was not the case, or when they were not in large numerical advantage, they were defeated.

==== The Congress of Florida ====
On 25 August 1825, in an assembly gathered in Florida, the inhabitants of the Banda Oriental declared their independence from Brazil and their union with the United Provinces. The declaration's goal was to compel the Argentine government to take definitive action.

==== Puntas del Águila, Rincón, and Sarandí ====
Brazilian general José de Abreu, who had entered the province's countryside in June 1825 with 1,300 men, decided to take the initiative. He ordered Bento Manuel Ribeiro to march towards Rivera and attack him whenever he was found. Rivera, in turn, wanted to avoid any encounter with the Brazilians, but was found by Ribeiro, who defeated him at Puntas del Águila on 4 September 1825. According to Carneiro, the victory made Ribeiro too confident and eager: after defeating Rivera, he marched to Montevideo in order to convince Lecor, who passively watched everything, to take the initiative. Taking advantage of Ribeiro's absence, Rivera decided to attack the Brazilian camp at Rincón de las Gallinas and take the more than six thousand horses guarded there. On 24 September, he defeated the small garrison and, when preparing to leave, was informed that two Brazilian cavalry units were approaching the camp. Rivera then ambushed and defeated each of them separately.

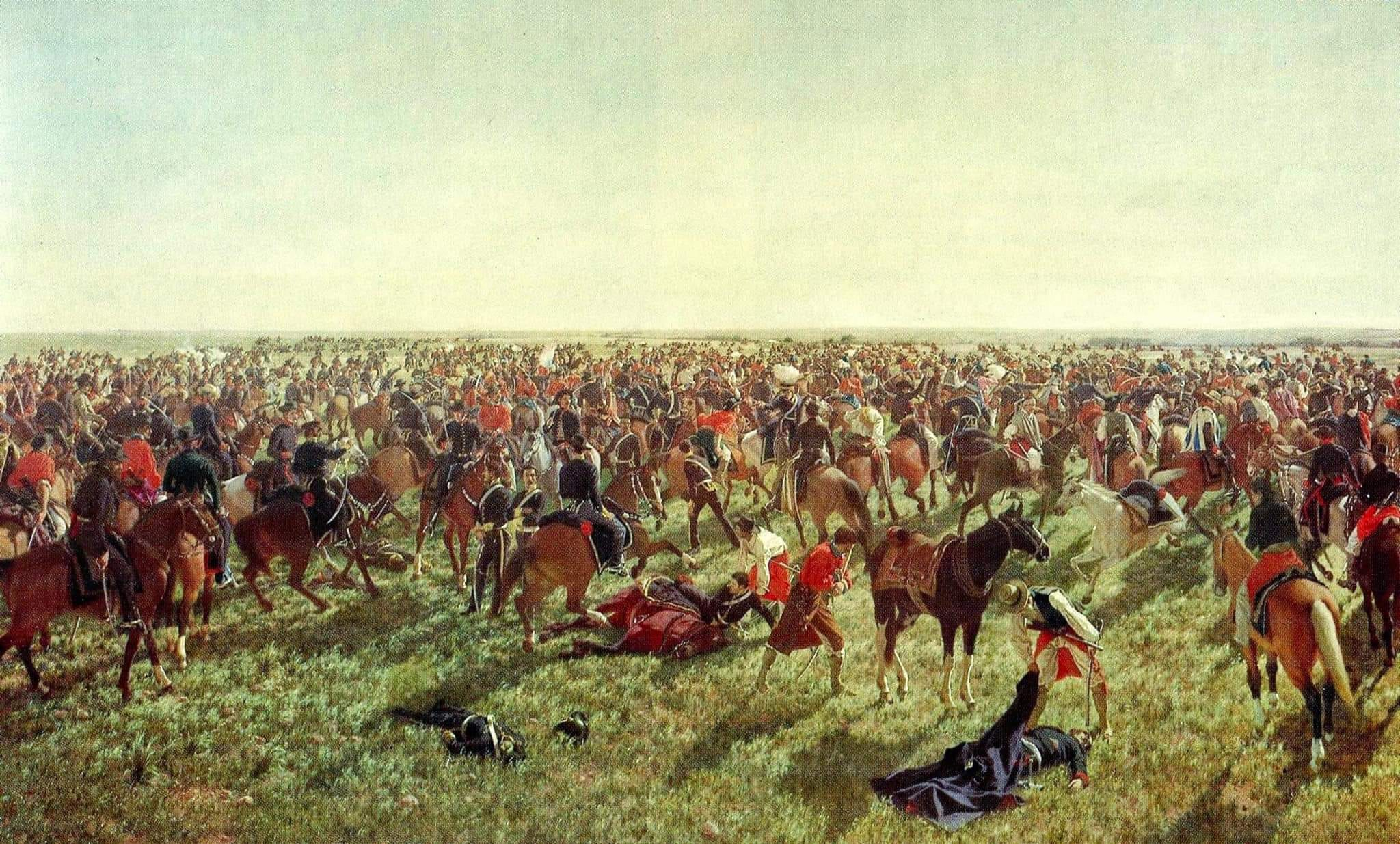
The battle of Sarandí, by Juan Manuel Blanes

Once convinced by Bento Manuel to go on the offensive, Lecor devised a plan to defeat the patriots separately and ordered Bento Manuel to reconnoitre the countryside. Bento Manuel left Montevideo for Minas on 1 October with 1,150 cavalrymen in order to join forces with Bento Gonçalves and his 354 men. After the junction, they were to march towards Lavalleja and fight him before he could join forces with Rivera. The two leaders managed to join forces, however, and together they numbered more than 2,000 men. Bento Manuel reached Minas on 2 October and continued marching North until Barragán, where he met Bento Gonçalves on the 5th. After joining forces with Bento Gonçalves, the Brazilian commander set out in search of Rivera. On 11 October, Bento Manuel received news that Rivera was on the right bank of the Sarandí River and decided to launch a surprise attack.

The patriots, however, already aware of the Brazilian approach due to the observations made by Manuel Oribe, decided to gather all their troops and wait for the arrival of Bento Manuel. Arriving at Sarandí on 12 October, Bento Manuel, believing he had caught Rivera by surprise, found himself facing the entire Oriental force. The battle began in the morning with the first shots fired, but, greatly outnumbered, the Brazilians could not hold out for long, and their troops were completely scattered. The two Brazilian commanders gathered some of the dispersed troops and headed toward Polanco, being pursued by Rivera, but managed to escape after swimming across the Yi River. After the battle, the Orientals took the town of Mercedes, after the capitulation of the local Brazilian commander, and the towns of Salto and Paysandú, which had been abandoned by the Brazilians, who now only controlled the cities of Colonia del Sacramento and Montevideo, and the fortresses of Santa Teresa and São Miguel.

=== The outbreak of war ===
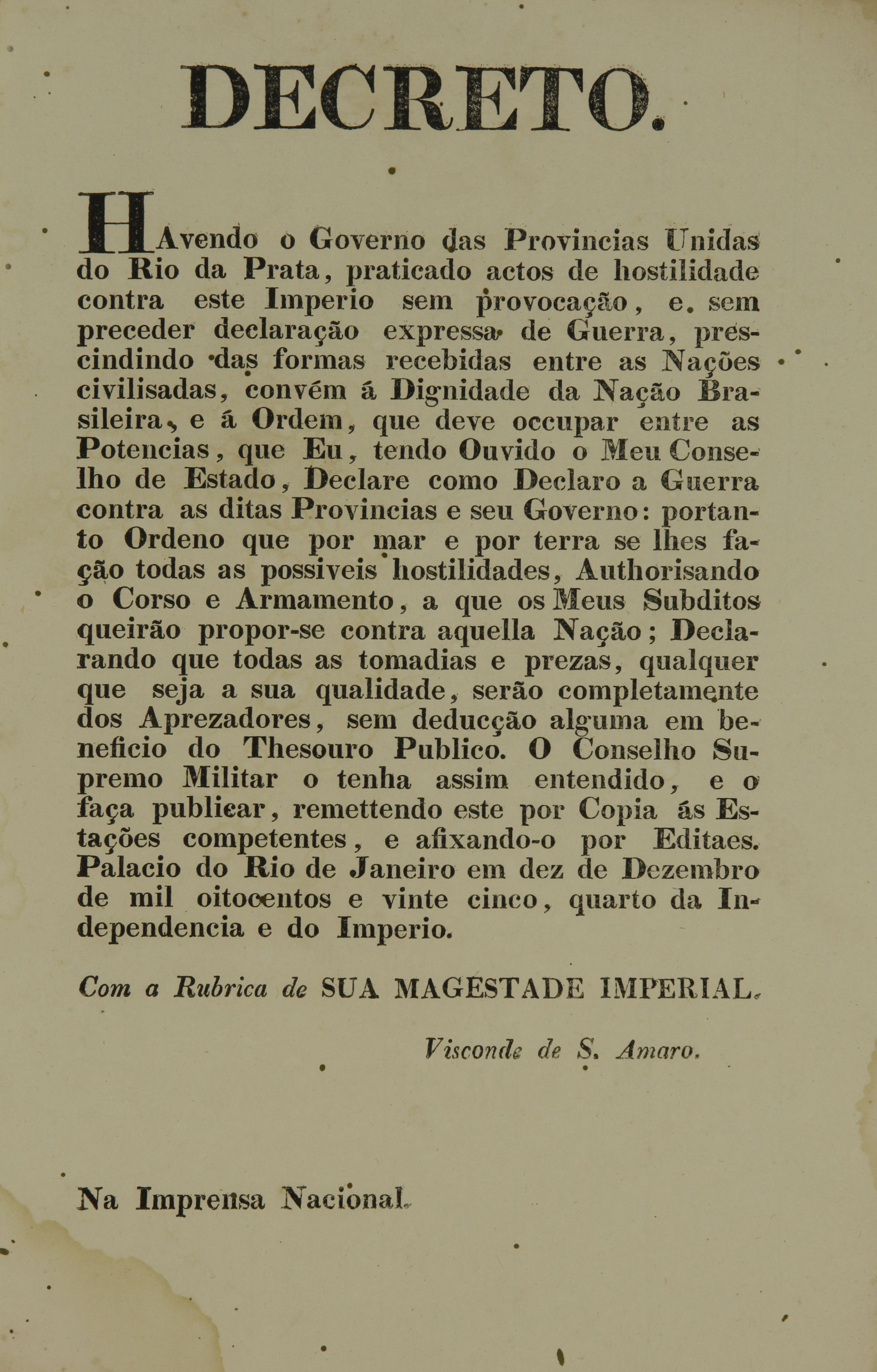
The Brazilian declaration of war, signed by the Viscount of Santo Amaro (Note: It reads: Whereas the Government of the United Provinces of the Río de la Plata has committed acts of hostility against this Empire without provocation and without a prior express declaration of war, disregarding the forms observed among civilized nations, it befits the dignity of the Brazilian Nation and the rank it holds among the Powers that I—having consulted My Council of State—do hereby declare war against the said Provinces and their government; therefore, I order that all possible hostilities be waged against them by sea and by land, authorizing privateering and the arming of vessels by such of My subjects as may wish to undertake operations against that nation, and declaring that all captures and prizes, of whatever nature, shall belong entirely to their captors, without any deduction for the benefit of the Public Treasury. The Supreme Military Council shall take due note of this and arrange for its publication, forwarding copies to the appropriate authorities and posting it via public notices. Rio de Janeiro Palace, 10 December 1825, the fourth year of Independence and of the Empire. Signed by HIS IMPERIAL MAJESTY. Viscount of S. Amaro. At the National Printing Office.)

With the rebellion gaining traction after the victories at Rincón and Sarandí, the Argentines began mobilizing for war. On 9 May 1825, the Congress of the United Provinces ordered Manuel José García to be sent to Upper Peru as a plenipotentiary to secure Simón Bolívar's support against Brazil, which was seen as an "arm of the Holy Alliance in the Americas". The instructions given to García included a proposal for joint action by Colombia, Peru, and Chile to force the evacuation of Cisplatina. According to Luís Alberto Bandeira, the negotiations ultimately failed due to the demands made by Bolívar, who, despite having the Brazilian invasion of Chiquitos and Moxos as a pretext, insisted on assuming overall command of operations and feared the consequences such an attack might have with Great Britain. The Argentine Congress approved, on 11 May 1825, a law that provided for the creation and maintenance of an army. This army, created by Juan Gregorio de las Heras on 13 May 1825, was named "Observation Army" and had a predicted strength of 8,000 men. Command was given to general Martín Rodriguez, who positioned it along the Uruguay River without any notification to the Brazilian government. This act caused the protest of the Brazilian consul in Buenos Aires, Antônio José Falcão da Frota, who had been appointed for the office that same month.

On the night of 20 October 1825, the population in Buenos Aires took to the streets and attacked the Brazilian consulate shouting death to the emperor of Brazil and insulting the Brazilian consul, to which the Argentine government refused to give any satisfaction. According to Argentine historian Ángel Carranza, the people and the press in Argentina "ardently clamored for the vindication of the usurped property". A few days later, on 28 October, Frota wrote his last report to the Brazilian government, declaring that the United Provinces' Congress had already decided on war. Fearing for his own safety, he left Buenos Aires and returned to Brazil.

The Argentine Congress proclaimed the Cisplatina province reintegrated into the United Provinces on 25 October 1825, declaring that it would help the insurgents against Brazil by all means; this decision was communicated to the Minister of Foreign Affairs of Brazil by means of a note on 3 November. The following day, the Argentine government broke off diplomatic relations with Brazil, claiming that the Imperial Navy had engaged in acts of hostility in the River Plate. Faced with this situation, the Empire of Brazil then responded by formally declaring war on the United Provinces on 10 December 1825, with admiral Rodrigo Lobo declaring "all the ports of the Republic in a state of blockade" eleven days later, on 21 December. The United Provinces reciprocated on 1 December 1826.

== Internal situation ==
=== United Provinces ===
Having recently gained their independence, the provinces that once constituted the former Viceroyalty of the Río de la Plata were undergoing a process of internal organization in the early 1820s. Following the Battle of Cepeda in 1820, the Directory of the United Provinces collapsed and Buenos Aires ceased to exercise control over the other interior provinces, leaving the country without a centralized authority.

Prior to the outbreak of hostilities, General Juan Gregorio de Las Heras—having succeeded Martín Rodríguez as governor of Buenos Aires in 1824—convened the General Constituent Congress with representatives from all the provinces, whose initial objective was for them to delegate the conduct of foreign relations to the province of Buenos Aires. The provinces, for their part, sought the formation of a national government. As its first measure, the assembled Congress approved, on 23 January 1825, the "Fundamental Law" granting the provinces the right to accept or reject the constitution that would eventually be approved, while also delegating the conduct of foreign relations to Buenos Aires. Once work on drafting the national constitution began, the options outlined for the country's organization were divided between a federal model and a unitary one. Proponents of the unitary model argued that the central state should consolidate all state powers, leaving the provinces without autonomy and restricted to local administration. Conversely, the federalists advocated for sovereignty to be shared between the provinces and the central state, with the latter's powers delegated by the provincial states, which would retain the right to enact their own laws and constitutions. A consultation with the provinces was then held; despite the diverse opinions expressed regarding the form of government to be adopted, the deputies ultimately decided in favor of a unitary system. (Note: According to Mariano Di Pasquale, "Córdoba, Mendoza, San Juan and Santiago del Estero spoke out in favor of a federal system; Salta, Tucumán and La Rioja opted for the unitary system; Catamarca, San Luís and Corrientes decided to approve whatever Congress determined; and Buenos Aires, Entre Ríos, Santa Fe, Banda Oriental and Misiones did not express their opinion", Di Pasquale 2009, p. 219)

With the outbreak of war and faced with the pressing need to establish a permanent national executive authority to manage the conflict, the Presidency Law was approved on 6 February 1826. Through this law, Congress appointed Bernardino Rivadavia, a liberal and prominent unitario, as the first president of the United Provinces of the Río de la Plata, whose duties included serving as commander-in-chief of the armed forces.

== Opposing forces ==
=== Argentine ===
==== Republican Army ====
By January 1826 the Observation Army numbered 2,000 men, but its ranks gradually grew as troops from other Argentine provinces arrived. It was made up of pre-existing units, such as part of the Río de la Plata Regiment, which consisted mostly of Afro-Argentines who had fought in José de San Martín's campaign in Peru, troops from the Auxiliary Army of Peru and a light infantry battalion created in Salta to fight against the royalists. According to the plan, each province was to provide 1.33% of their population, but recruitment proved difficult. The inhabitants of distant provinces had little interest in the war, and so troops from these provinces came at a slow pace. Desertion rates were high, and units sent to join the army arrived at the camp already depleted. Another issue was the lack of materiel. The commander Martín Rodríguez noted that the army did not have "funds [...] for the much-needed purchase of horses, and even to pay the salary of the soldier who comes from remote provinces with the expectation of receiving it monthly".

By the end of March the army numbered 2,800 men, well below the number anticipated by the government. According to Gabriel Di Meglio, the practice of capturing slaves for the army, which had been an important tool during the country's war of independence, "seems to have been somewhat more limited this time", as there was no slave trade in the country since 1812, and also due to the Free Womb law of 1813. Thus, new soldiers were mostly forced conscripts, who came from those deemed "vagrants" by the authorities. Harsh punishments were applied to deserters, such as floggings and even executions by firing squad. Lacking other effective means, the Argentine government intensified forced recruitment, especially in the province of Buenos Aires, where it had greater effective control.

Dissent among the Orientals and Argentines was also an issue, as Lavalleja refused to incorporate his forces into the Argentine Army or to submit to the orders of Martín Rodríguez. When the situation seemed to be heading toward an armed conflict, Lavalleja agreed to incorporate his forces into the National Army, at the same time that the Buenos Aires government replaced Martín Rodríguez with Carlos María de Alvear as the commander-in-chief of the republican forces. The army finally began to organize and, under Alvear's command, the troops spent three months in training and preparation. Likewise, the necessary equipment was gradually received and distributed among the soldiers. Thus, when they began marching again in September 1826, the republican forces numbered around 12,000 men, including the Oriental troops, most of which consisted of cavalry. The Argentine Congress changed the country's name from United Provinces to Argentine Republic, in line with the Unitarian project, and the army adopted the name "Republican Army".

==== Republican Navy ====
In Jorge Toscano's words, when compared to Brazil's maritime power, the Argentine Navy was "insignificant and consisted of little more than a handful of small ships left aside since the independence campaign", also remarking that the sight of admiral Lobo's fleet anchored in front of Buenos Aires was a constant reminder of the country's vulnerability. As a result, measures began to be taken in mid-1825: the new Argentine navy minister, Marcos Balcarce, created the navy's structure and appointed commanders José Zapiola and Benito de Goyena; these, in turn, established the payments, rations and uniforms, and also published privateering rules. Balcarce also sought to increase the fleet's size. According to Angel Carranza, at the beginning of 1826 the Argentine fleet numbered 16 ships: a corvette, two brigs, a ketch, and 12 gunboats.

According to L. A. Boiteux, upon creating their navy, "the Argentines did so not only in accordance with their financial resources, but also with the hydrographic conditions of the theater of operations: robust medium-draft ships, sailboats, well equipped, easily manoeuvrable". In Carranza's view, the Argentine fleet consisted of "some materially weak vessels, but that became respectable and effective by the strong spirit of their crews".

=== Brazilian ===
==== Imperial Army ====
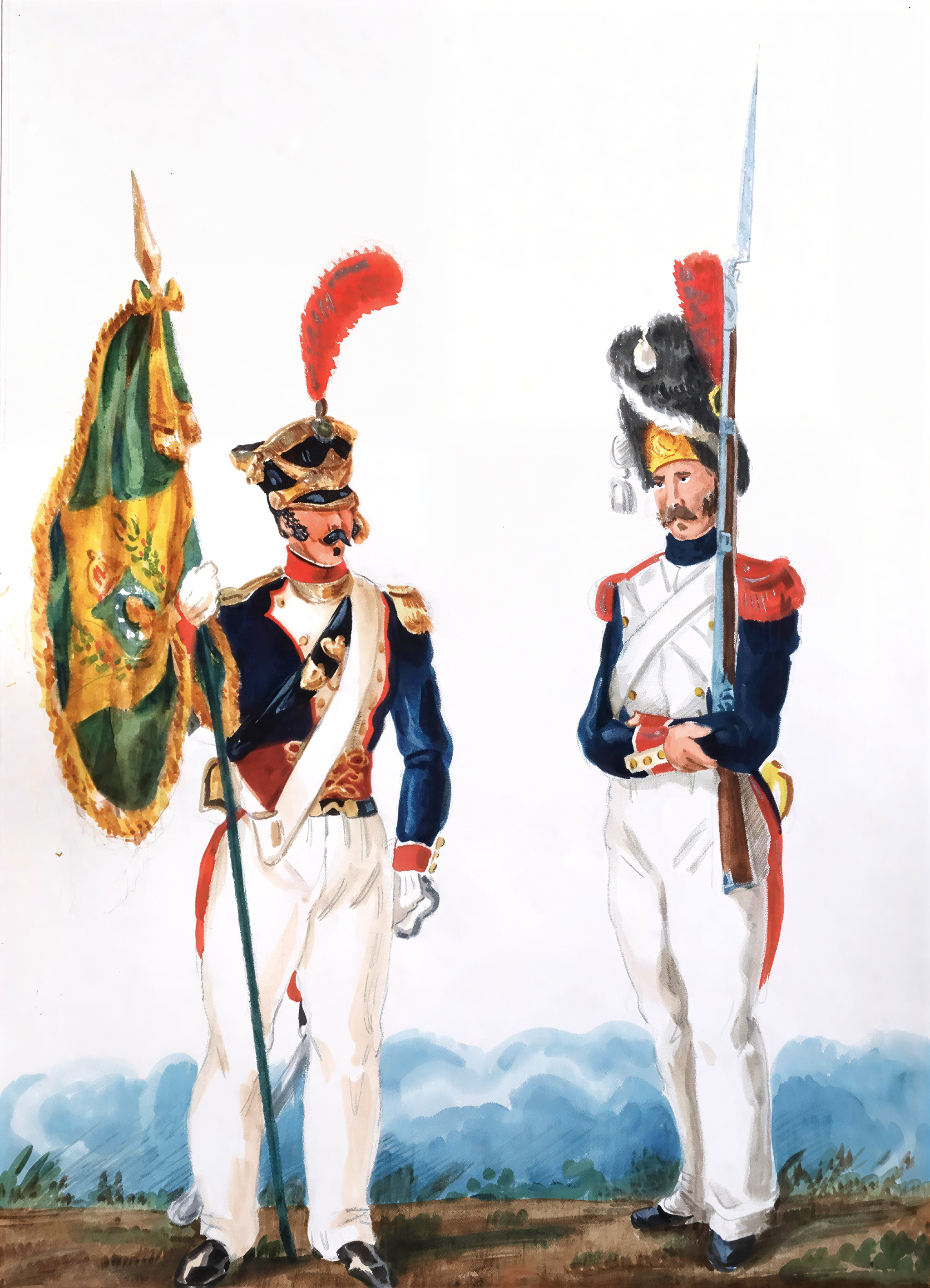
Depiction of an officer of the Foreign Battalion (left) and a Brazilian grenadier of the Emperor's Battalion (right), by Auguste de Valmont

The Imperial Brazilian Army was officially created on 1 December 1824, when a decree established its regular organization, numbering and standardizing the various units that had fought under the Brazilian flag since the independence campaign in 1822. The force was divided into first- and second-line troops, consisting of paid soldiers and unpaid militias, respectively. The first line nominally numbered 30,000 men, divided into 3 grenadier battalions, 28 caçadores (light infantry) battalions, 7 cavalry regiments, 5 horse artillery corps, and 12 field artillery corps, spread across the country. Two grenadier and two caçadores battalions were made up of foreign mercenaries, mostly Germans and Irishmen. In turn, the second line numbered 40,000 men, but this figure did not translate into real military strength, given the lack of training among second-line troops, as well as their politically motivated recruitment, aimed at avoiding enlistment in the first line.

The first line units based in Rio Grande do Sul consisted of the 9th Battalion of Caçadores, and the 4th and 5th Cavalry Regiments, based in the cities of Porto Alegre, Jaguarão and Rio Pardo, respectively. The second line ones consisted of the 46th Battalion of Caçadores, spread across the province, and the 20th (Porto Alegre), 21st (Rio Grande), 22nd (Rio Pardo), 23rd (Alegrete), 24th and 25th (São Borja) Cavalry Regiments. The 25th Cavalry Regiment consisted only of Guarani indians. Recruitment was one of the main issues faced by the army. As early as 1823, members of the Constituent Assembly complained about the 'predatory' nature of recruitment, which amounted to a true "manhunt", threatening the country's economy and society. When the Brazilian Parliament met for the first time in 1826, it was a consensus among its members that recruitment needed to be reformed, but no concrete measures were taken, and so forced recruitment continued.

==== Imperial Navy ====
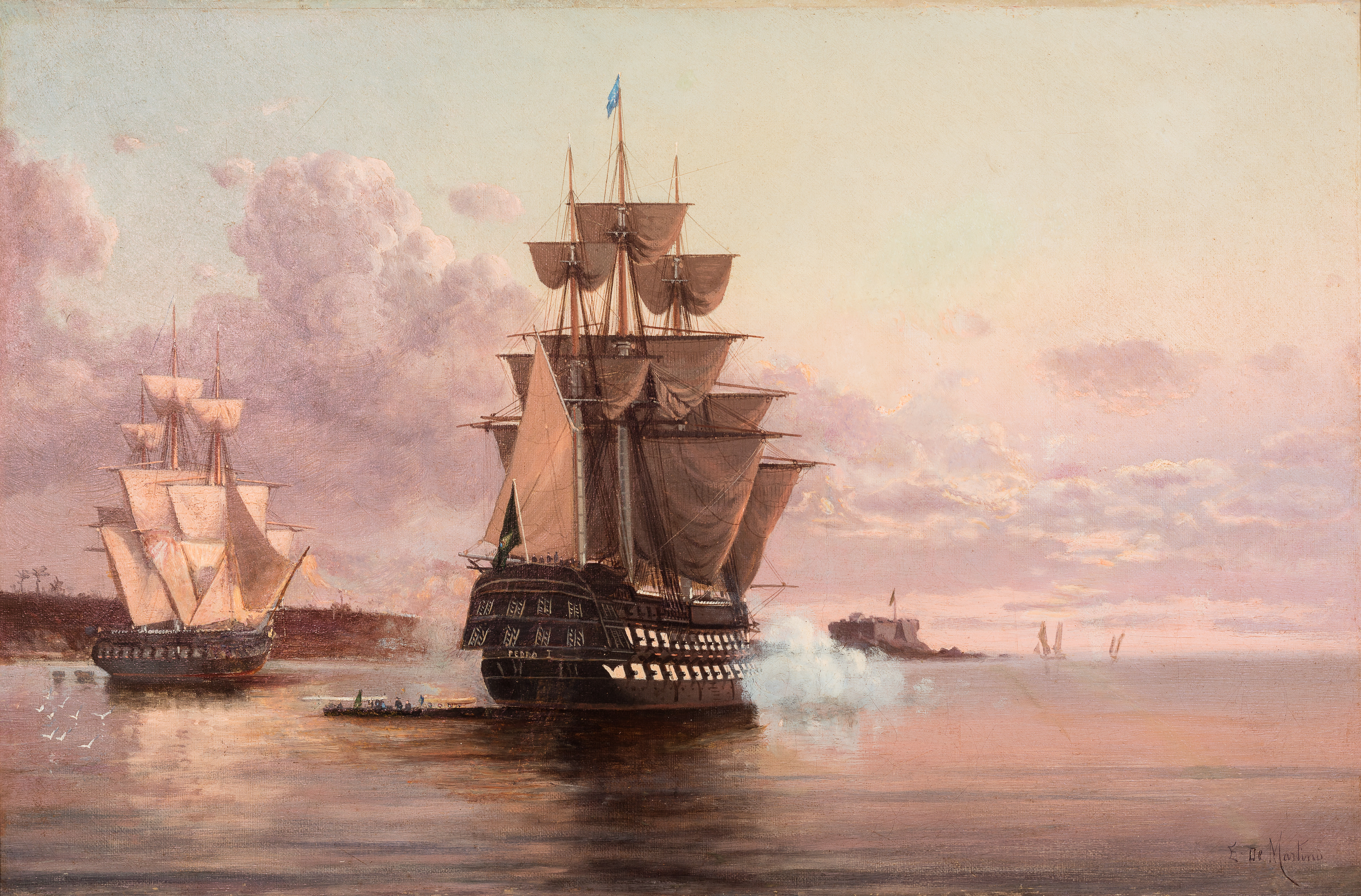
The Brazilian ship of the line Pedro I, by Edoardo De Martino

According to Brian Vale and Jorge Luis Toscano, Brazil was the largest naval power in the Americas at the time. Toscano estimated the Brazilian fleet at no less than 65 large warships for a total of 690 guns in 1825, also counting 31 small armed packet boats and transport vessels, noting that it had doubled in size in the three years after the country's independence war by the purchase or incorporation of ships that had been captured by lord Thomas Cochrane from Portugal during the conflict. Apart from purchasing ships, the imperial government also ordered the construction of new ones in local shipyards: two frigates, two corvettes and several gunboats and yachts.

In Hélio Leôncio Martins' estimate, the Imperial Brazilian Navy was the strongest force Brazil could rely on, numbering a total of 121 ships including two ships of the line, Pedro I and Príncipe Real, 8 frigates, 7 corvettes, 1 lugger, 17 brigs, 24 schooners, 33 gunboats, and other vessels. Apart from these vessels, the Brazilian fleet also included merchant ones that had been armed and converted into warships. Its quality varied, however; the frigates were no older than eight years, but the corvettes and brigs included ships from the Napoleonic Wars, such as Itaparica, Liberal and Cacique, to new ones built in North America, such as Maria da Gloria and Maceió. The ships of the line, Pedro I and Príncipe Real, built in 1763 and 1771, respectively, were old and in poor condition, with the latter serving only as a prison ship while the former, despite still being in active service during the war, was in serious need of repairs.

Brazil's naval policy became the subject of criticism for the government's opposition, which were repeated by foreign observers. The former, wanting to harm the emperor's ministers, described the navy as a "naval police", saying that, instead of the large and heavy frigates bought by the government, it would have been better to acquire low draft schooners, better suited for navigation in the shallow waters of the River Plate. For John Armitage, the desire of "ostentation" and to show off an "exalted idea" of its naval power to foreign nations had led Brazil to purchase and build heavy vessels, unsuited for war in the River Plate. Armitage also opined that "swift-sailing vessels would not only have been more easily equipped, but also more appropriate to the actual exigencies of the country". This was also Gustavo Barroso's opinion, for whom the Brazilian fleet was "abundant, but inadequate", as its ships "were not suited to our people, our service and the war against [our] neighbours inside their home". In turn, Toscano argued that these criticisms were unjustified, remarking that, for a country like Brazil, with a large coast and sea trade routes to defend, having a balanced navy with both large and small vessels would be ideal; Toscano also pointed out that John Armitage's remarks were "accepted without criticism in its nominal value by many historians".

When the war broke out in December 1825, the Brazilian naval forces in the River Plate consisted of the frigate Tétis, the corvette Liberal, 2 brigs, a barque, 12 schooners, and 8 gunboats; the same fleet that, under the command of Pedro Nunes, had fought against the Portuguese during Brazil's independence war and also against Artigas in 1820. This squadron was promptly reinforced by two frigates, Imperatriz and Dona Paula, two corvettes, Itaparica and Maceió, one brig and other smaller vessels.

== Course of war ==
=== On land ===
1826

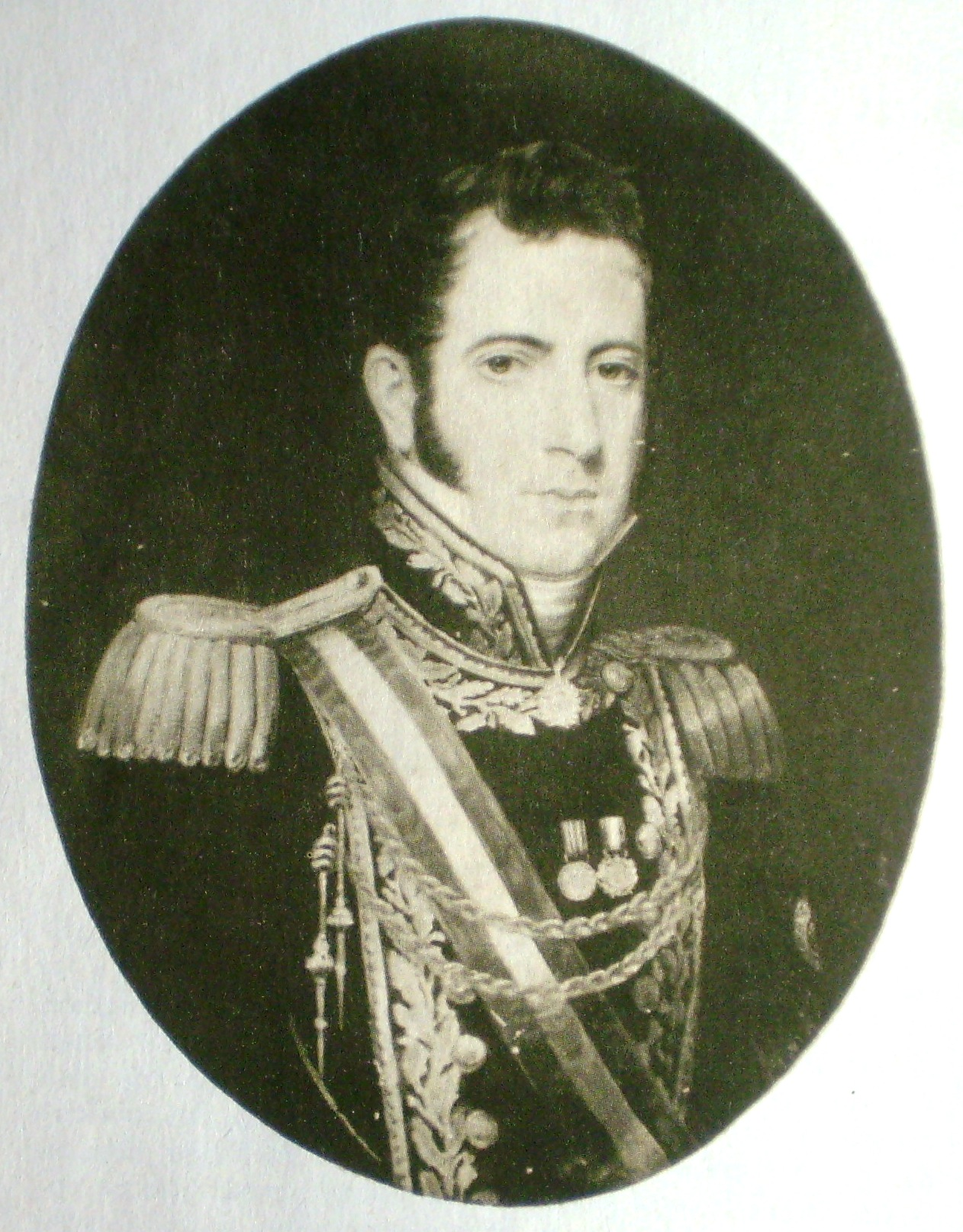
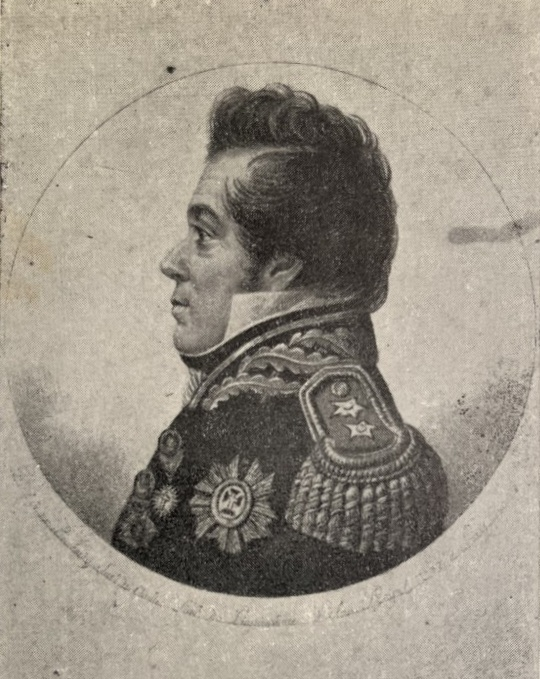
Carlos María de Alvear and Felisberto Caldeira Brant, commanders of the republican and imperial armies, respectively

Once the war had begun, the Orientals surprised the Brazilian garrison at the fortress of Santa Teresa, capturing it on 31 December 1825 and subsequently invading Brazilian territory up to the city of Santa Vitória do Palmar, whose defenders, few in number, fled in the face of the invaders. The next year, on 28 January 1826, the Argentine Army crossed the Uruguay River and established its headquarters in the town of Salto. Lavalleja's forces were concentrated in the town of Durazno, where they observed any Brazilian movements. The Brazilians, in turn, were gathering troops near Santana do Livramento. The commander of these troops, brigadier Massena Rosado, an inexperienced officer, ordered Bento Manuel and his men, who were in Quaraí, to join him. Thus, Brazil had two stationary armies, one in Santana do Livramento and the other in Montevideo.

The Argentines decided to launch a combined land and naval attack against Colonia del Sacramento. Numerous failed attempts took place from February to March 1826, with the attackers suffering considerable losses. Several skirmishes also followed throughout 1826, without major consequences for the outcome of the war, while the larger operations took place at sea. General Martín Rodríguez had left his camp on the banks of the Uruguay River and established himself in Durazno. Infighting between Rivera and Lavalleja led the former to rebel and the latter to hand over the government of the Banda Oriental to Joaquín Suárez. In order to avoid further problems, the Argentine government appointed general Carlos María de Alvear as the commander of the republican army on 14 August 1826. Alvear arrived at Durazno on 1 September, replacing Martín Rodríguez.

In the Brazilian side, Rosado's passive conduct prompted criticism and complaints, which led emperor Pedro I to decide to go personally to the theater of operations and replace him. The emperor appointed the 54-year old general Felisberto Caldeira Brant, the Marquess of Barbacena, as the new commander-in-chief of the imperial forces. Pedro I left Rio de Janeiro on 24 November 1826 aboard the ship Pedro I, taking with him 800 infantry soldiers, including troops from the 27th Battalion of Caçadores, consisting of German soldiers. He arrived in Porto Alegre on 6 December, bringing with him the German general Gustav Heinrich von Braun. Before meeting with the troops, however, the emperor decided to return to Rio de Janeiro. On 11 December empress Leopoldina died at the court, but the news of her death had not yet reached the emperor when he had already decided to return to Rio de Janeiro.

1827

Once in command, Barbacena visited the frontier towns, arriving at the Brazilian army camp in Santana do Livramento on 1 January 1827. The poor condition of the troops left a bad impression on the general. There was a lack of equipment, and the soldiers were sick and undisciplined, which had led to numerous desertions. Under general Massena Rosado's command, nearly 2,000 men had already deserted. The marquess then began reorganizing the troops. He had already requested the dispatch of 15,000 men, ammunition, and funds from the imperial government in order to march against the Argentines. The government, in turn, did not meet his demands. At the same time, general Braun, in the town of Rio Grande, was making efforts to recruit more men, having with him fractions of the 18th and 27th Battalions of Caçadores and the 4th, 5th, and 6th Cavalry Regiments, for a total of about 1,800 soldiers. The two commanders decided to join forces near the Palmas stream, with Barbacena starting his march on 13 January 1827.

In turn, general Carlos María de Alvear was marching with the republican forces toward Bagé in order to prevent the junction of the two Brazilian commanders and defeat them separately, believing that the Brazilian forces would only grow over time. The Argentine commander issued a proclamation rallying his troops to fight, stating that "millions of Brazilians" were "reaching out to them". He believed the local population to be republican, but the inhabitants resisted the invasion. Alvear and Barbacena were seeking each other in order to engage in a decisive battle, methodically marching in search of a favorable battleground. The Argentines preferred the plains due to their superiority in cavalry, while the Brazilians favored the hills, given their superior infantry.

On 23 January, an Argentine cavalry vanguard brought the news that the Brazilians had begun their march toward the Argentines, which caused euphoria in the republican army. Barbacena was unaware of the whereabouts of the republicans and decided to dispatch a cavalry vanguard under the command of Sebastião Barreto to track the Argentine movements and provide cover for his own march. On 5 February, after weeks of marching, Barbacena and Braun managed to join forces on the banks of the Lexiguana River, frustrating Alvear's plans. The Argentine commander had arrived in Bagé on 26 January and left the city on the 30th after sacking it. Alvear then decided to march toward São Gabriel, being followed by Barbacena. Minor encounters between the vanguards of the two armies heightened the tension. On 13 February, colonel Bento Manuel’s forward detachment clashed with colonel Juan Lavalle's forces near Vacacai. Two days later, another clash took place between the forward detachments of Lucio Norberto Mansilla, chief of the Argentine General Staff, and Bento Manuel, in the vicinity of Umbu. The Brazilians already knew the Argentine position since 14 February and were eager to attack.

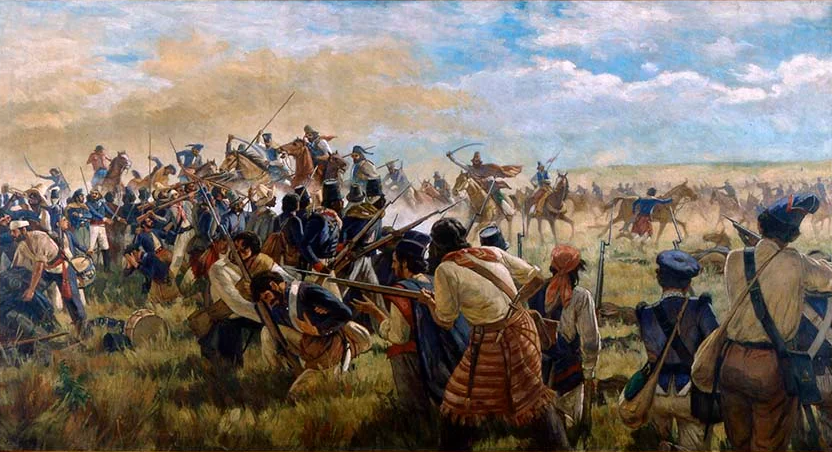
Brazilian infantry repelling an Argentine cavalry charge at Passo do Rosário, by José Wasth Rodrigues

On 19 February, immediately after arriving at Passo do Rosário, Alvear ordered his forces to cross the nearby Santa Maria River. Barbacena hoped to attack the republicans while they were still crossing the river. The dangerous Argentine position caused widespread discontent among the troops, and Alvear was nearly removed from command. A council of republican commanders was gathered and decided to march back and occupy the nearby hills, where they would prepare for battle. At dawn on 20 February Barbacena sighted the republican forces near Passo do Rosário. He was determined to attack them, despite being outnumbered, believing he was facing only the enemy rearguard. 6,300 Brazilians were about to clash with 7,700 Argentines and Orientals. The confrontation, known as battle of Passo do Rosário, in Brazil, or Ituzaingó, in Argentina, began at 06:00, with both armies exchanging artillery fire, while repeated Argentine cavalry charges were repelled by the Brazilian infantry, who formed squares. Still, the Argentines managed to isolate the Brazilians from their baggage carts, cutting off ammunition supply and setting the grassfields on fire. Localized imperial counterattacks recovered other threatened positions, but the numerical superiority and tactical flexibility of the republican cavalry eventually forced Barbacena to order a retreat after six hours of battle and the desertion of 1,500 troops. Although some Brazilian accounts framed the battle as indecisive, Carneiro emphasized that the outcome constituted a tactical defeat for the Empire, as control of the battlefield remained with the republican forces, enabling them to claim victory, while the imperials withdrew toward Passo do Cacequi.

The Argentine forces did not interfere with Barbacena's withdrawal after the battle, with Alvear oredring his troops to countermarch to Passo do Rosário, where they had left their baggage before the engagement. Only Lavalleja, with roughly 2,000 cavalry, followed the Brazilian army at a distance, shadowing its movements until about 18:30. The Argentines entered São Gabriel on 26 February, resting there for three days before resuming their movement toward Corrales, while the Brazilians headed toward São Lourenço. In Carneiro's words, Itazaingó marked "the last gasp of the United Provinces' army, which was henceforth to remain exhausted and without the possibility of receiving new supplies". After the battle, both armies abandoned the idea of another decisive pitched battle, preferring to attack the enemy from advantageous positions.

The Imperial forces began to reorganize, sending out troops to capture fleeing soldiers and horses. The Republicans reoccupied Bagé on 18 April, followed by further fighting between the advance forces of the two armies on 23 April (Camacuã), 24 (São Diogo) and 25 May (Pedras Altas/Yerbal), and 2 June (Sego). On 20 June, Barbacena handed over command of the Brazilian army to Braun, who set out for Porto Alegre, returning on 9 July with plans to put the Imperial troops on an offensive footing and attack the Argentines camped at Cerro Largo. The German general decided to relocate the Brazilian camp from São Lourenço—a site considered unhealthy—to a location near the Mirim Lagoon, on the banks of the Jaguarão River. By early 1828, Braun had 9,000 troops stationed in Jaguarão, also counting with another 6,000 scattered across the strongholds of the Río de la Plata region. The Argentines, for their part, had 6,000 men—a force that, in Carneiro's assessment, was dwindling.

1828

On 20 April 1828, Fructuoso Rivera—following an agreement with Estanislao López, the governor of Santa Fe province, and commanding a force separate from the republican army—launched a new invasion of Brazilian territory with the aim of plundering the Misiones region.

=== At sea ===
The two navies which confronted each other in the Río de la Plata and the South Atlantic were in many ways opposites. The Empire of Brazil was a major naval power consisting of 96 warships, large and small, an extensive coastal trade and a large international trade carried on mostly in British, French and American ships. The United Provinces had similar international trading links but had few naval pretensions. Its navy consisted of only half a dozen warships and a few gunboats for port defence. Both navies were short of indigenous sailors and relied heavily on British—and, to a lesser extent—American and French officers and sailors, the most notable of which were the Irish born admiral William Brown, and the commander of the Brazilian inshore squadron, the English commodore James Norton.

The strategy of the two nations reflected their respective positions. The Brazilians immediately imposed a blockade on the Río de la Plata and the trade of Buenos Aires on 31 December 1825, while the Argentines attempted to defy the blockade using Brown's squadron while unleashing a swarm of privateers to attack Brazilian seaborne commerce in the South Atlantic from their bases at Ensenada and more distant Carmen de Patagones. The Argentines gained some notable successes—most notably by defeating the Brazilian flotilla on the Uruguay River at the Battle of Juncal and by beating off a Brazilian attack on Carmen de Patagones. But by 1828, the superior numbers of Brazil's blockading squadrons had effectively destroyed Brown's naval force at the Monte Santiago and was successfully strangling the trade of Buenos Aires and the government revenue it generated.

==== Brazilian blockade ====
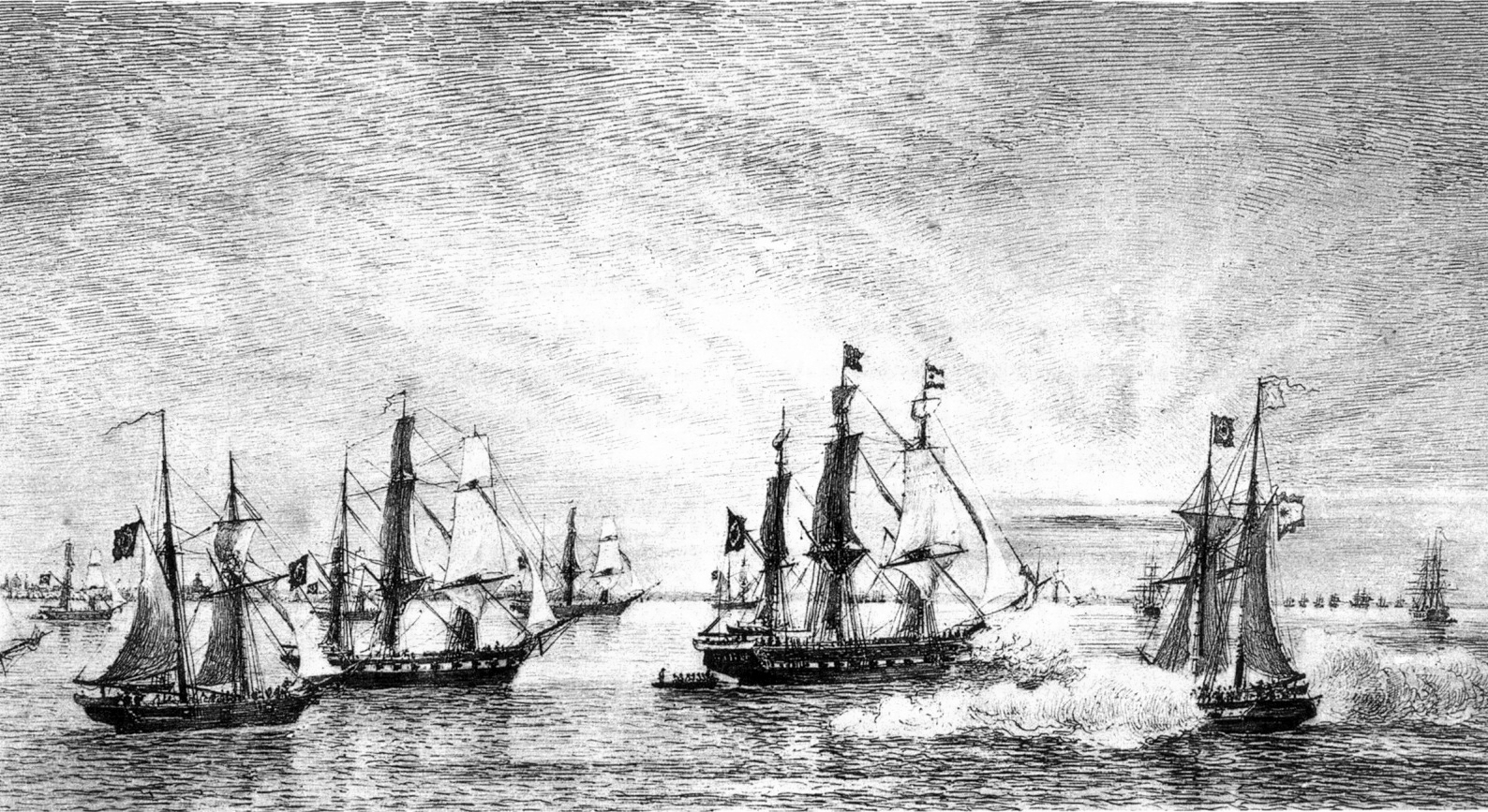
Brazilian fleet blockading Buenos Aires

According to Brian Vale, "it was inevitable that Brazil's principal weapon in the struggle would be a naval blockade", given the country's naval power. Moreover, ever since the United Provinces' independence from Spain, Buenos Aires had become a centre of trade, which, being carried out mostly by British, American, and French ships, totalled a yearly sum of 2 million pounds in 1825. It was, therefore, an obvious target. Following Brazil's declaration of war on 10 December 1825, admiral Rodrigo Lobo, commander of the Brazilian fleet in the River Plate, declared the blockade on 21 December, giving neutral vessels fourteen days to leave. News of the blockade only reached Buenos Aires ten days after its declaration, however, and a wave of panic ensued. Woodbine Parish, the British consul in the city, protested that it would be impossible for neutral vessels to leave in time, and so admiral Lobo agreed to postpone the beginning of the blockade to 31 January 1826.

Rodrigo Lobo's initial declaration stated that "all of the ports of the republic" were in a state of blockade. It caused different reactions from foreign powers. The United States view on blockades had been expressed before the war had begun, when Condy Raguet, the U.S. consul in Rio de Janeiro, wrote an extensive note to the Brazilian court detailing his government's position after being notified of the blockade on 6 December. Likewise, the American consul in Buenos Aires, colonel John Forbes, protested and accused Brazil of conducting a "paper" blockade for breaking the requirements of presence and continuity, since Lobo's fleet had made frequent returns to Montevideo for long periods.

The Americans held the view that a blockading force should not only be near the ports, but also in sight. They also argued that Brazil could not legitimally claim to be blockading Patagonia's southern coast when a single corvette was present there. In May, admiral Lobo conceded and agreed to limit the blockade to the River Plate's estuary. The United Kingdom, on the other hand, accepted the Brazilian position. As a naval power itself, it was not in Britain's interests for blockades to be hampered by excessive rules. The British government ordered its diplomatic posts to observe the blockade and refused requests for intervention made by its nationals to the Foreign Office.

In May 1826, Rodrigo Lobo was replaced by admiral Pinto Guedes, who reinvigorated the blockade, causing an enormous increase in the number of vessels seized, which motivated protests from Britain, France and the United States. In November Raguet announced that the United States refused to accept the legality of the blockade; the French ambassador was also instructed not to recognize it, unless Brazil released all French prizes and paid an indemnity. Only Britain continued to recognize it. With foreign patience waning, the Brazilian government backed down: on 26 November 1826, Guedes was ordered only to seize neutral vessels that were attempting to run the blockade after individually warning each one of them. The changes to the blockade's rules made the risk worth taking, and so the number of vessels reaching Buenos Aires, most of which were American, increased. Disappointed with his government's decision, Guedes declared: "I feel not the least repugnance to act fairly to the subjects of His Britannic Majesty, but no-one is ignorant of the mischief which citizens of the United States have done by taking advantage of the obstructions placed in the way of this squadron".

===== Economic impacts =====
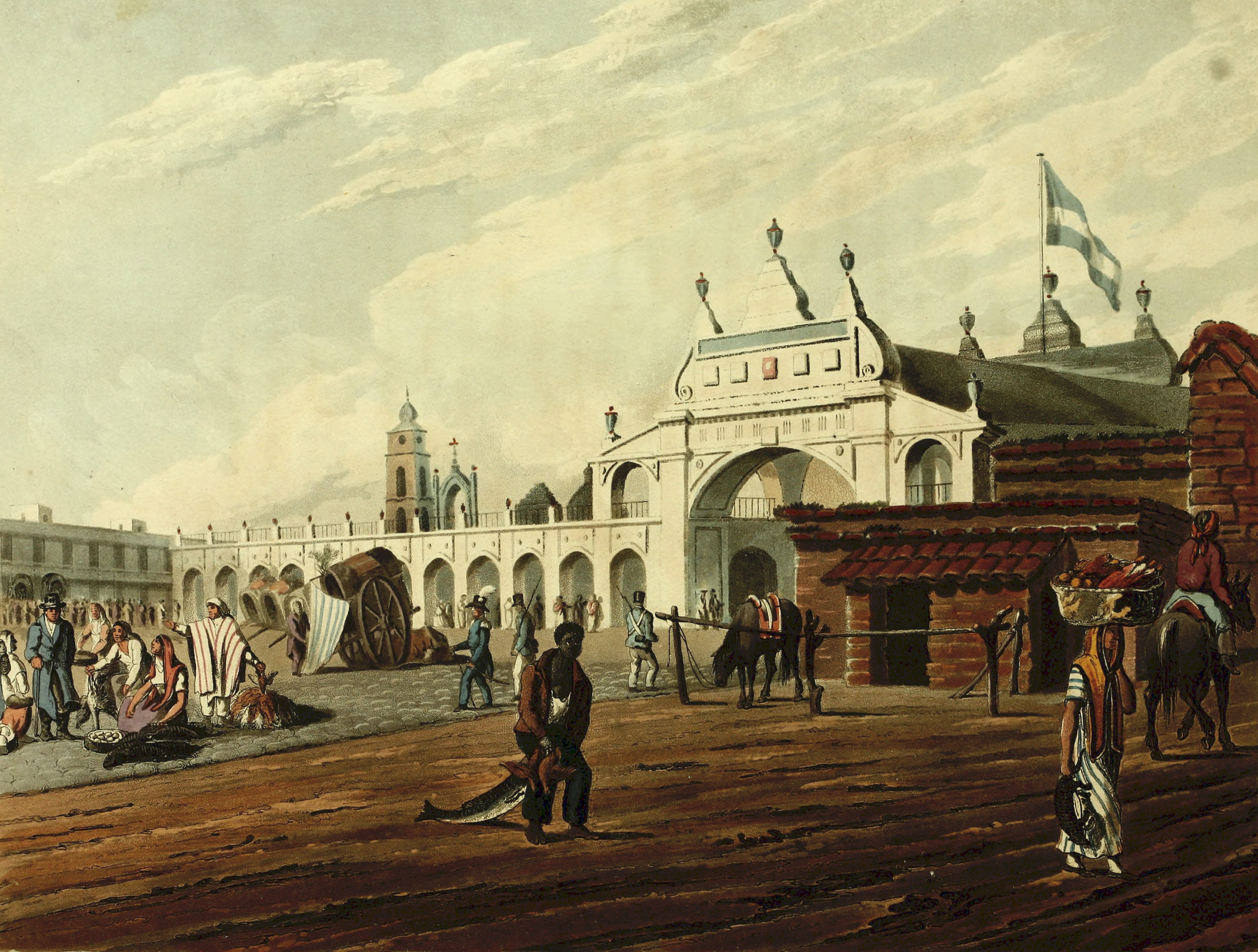
Buenos Aires' central market in 1818, by Emeric Essex Vidal

The economy of Buenos Aires, which was based on the export of cattle, was dependent on the city's port due to the customs revenues it generated. In Roberto Schmit's words, with the blockade, a negative economic cycle began, and production and trade plummeted. When admiral Pinto Guedes replaced Rodrigo Lobo, the Imperial Navy slowly began to strangle the trade from Buenos Aires. According to Vale, only two vessels managed to enter the city's port in the second half of 1826, ruining the country's finances. That year, customs revenues fell to 81,900 pounds from 429,300 in the previous year, and the price of imported commodities more than doubled. Tulio Halperín estimates that only during the first year of the war, the Argentine state spent 3.17 GBP per capita. To sustain this fiscal burden, the government resorted to tariffs and loans. Bonds issued for public and private investments lost their value and inflation quickly went up, as the government used its metal reserves to finance the war, leaving fiat money unbacked. The population's purchasing power decreased and several businessmen were ruined.

==== Privateering ====
The United Provinces issued a decree on 2 February 1826 authorizing privateers to attack Brazilian sea trade.

== Preliminary Peace Convention ==
The stalemate in the Cisplatine War was caused by the inability of the Argentine and Uruguayan land forces to capture major cities in Uruguay and Brazil, the severe economic consequences imposed by the Brazilian blockade of Buenos Aires, and the lack of manpower for a full-scale Brazilian land offensive against Argentine forces. There was also increasing public pressure in Brazil to end the war. All of this motivated the interest on both sides for a peaceful solution.

Given the high cost of the war for both sides and the threat it posed to trade between the United Provinces and the United Kingdom, the latter pressed the two belligerent parties to engage in peace negotiations in Rio de Janeiro. Under British mediation, the United Provinces and the Empire of Brazil signed the 1828 Treaty of Montevideo, which acknowledged the independence of Cisplatina under the name Eastern Republic of Uruguay.

The treaty also granted Brazil sovereignty over the eastern section of the former Eastern Jesuit Missions and, most importantly, guaranteed free navigation of the Río de la Plata, a central national security issue for the Brazilians.

== Aftermath ==
In Brazil, the loss of Cisplatina added to growing discontent with Emperor Pedro I. The liberals became stronger in parliament and managed to downsize a seditious army and strengthen their local militias. Although it was far from the main reason, it was a factor that led to a rebellion which took place in Rio de Janeiro on 13 March 1831. These tensions led to the abdication of the Emperor.

In Argentina, the war led to Rivadavia’s resign. The national authorities were dissolved and Argentina de facto defaulted on its debt to Baring Brothers. After the loss of the Banda Oriental, peripheral elites had the momentum, and Juan Manuel de Rosas, the new leader of the federales, soon retook the governorship of Buenos Aires, starting a three-decades-long intermittent civil war between unitarios and federales.

== Legacy ==
Although the war was not a war of independence, as none of the belligerents fought to establish an independent nation, the Independence in Uruguay was a direct consequence of it, and it has a similar recognition within Uruguay. The Thirty-Three Orientals are acknowledged as national heroes, who freed Uruguay from Brazilian rule. The landing of the Thirty-Three Orientals is also known as the "Liberation crusade".

The war has a similar reception within Argentina, considered as a brave fight against an enemy of superior forces. The Argentine Navy has named many ships after people, events and ships involved in the war. William Brown (known as "Guillermo Brown" in Argentina) is considered the father of the Argentine navy, and is treated akin to an epic hero for his actions in the war. He is also known as the "Nelson of the Río de la Plata".

Brazil has had little interest in the war beyond naval warfare buffs. Few Brazilian historians have examined it in detail. The national heroes of Brazil are instead from Brazilian independence, the conflicts with Rosas (Platine War) or the Paraguayan War.

Despite the role of Britain in the war, and the presence of British naval officials on both sides of the conflict, the war is largely unknown in the English-speaking world.

== See also ==
- Brazil–Uruguay relations
- Argentina–Brazil relations
- Argentina–Uruguay relations
- List of wars involving Brazil
- List of wars involving Argentina
