= Agraciada Beach =

Beach in Uruguay

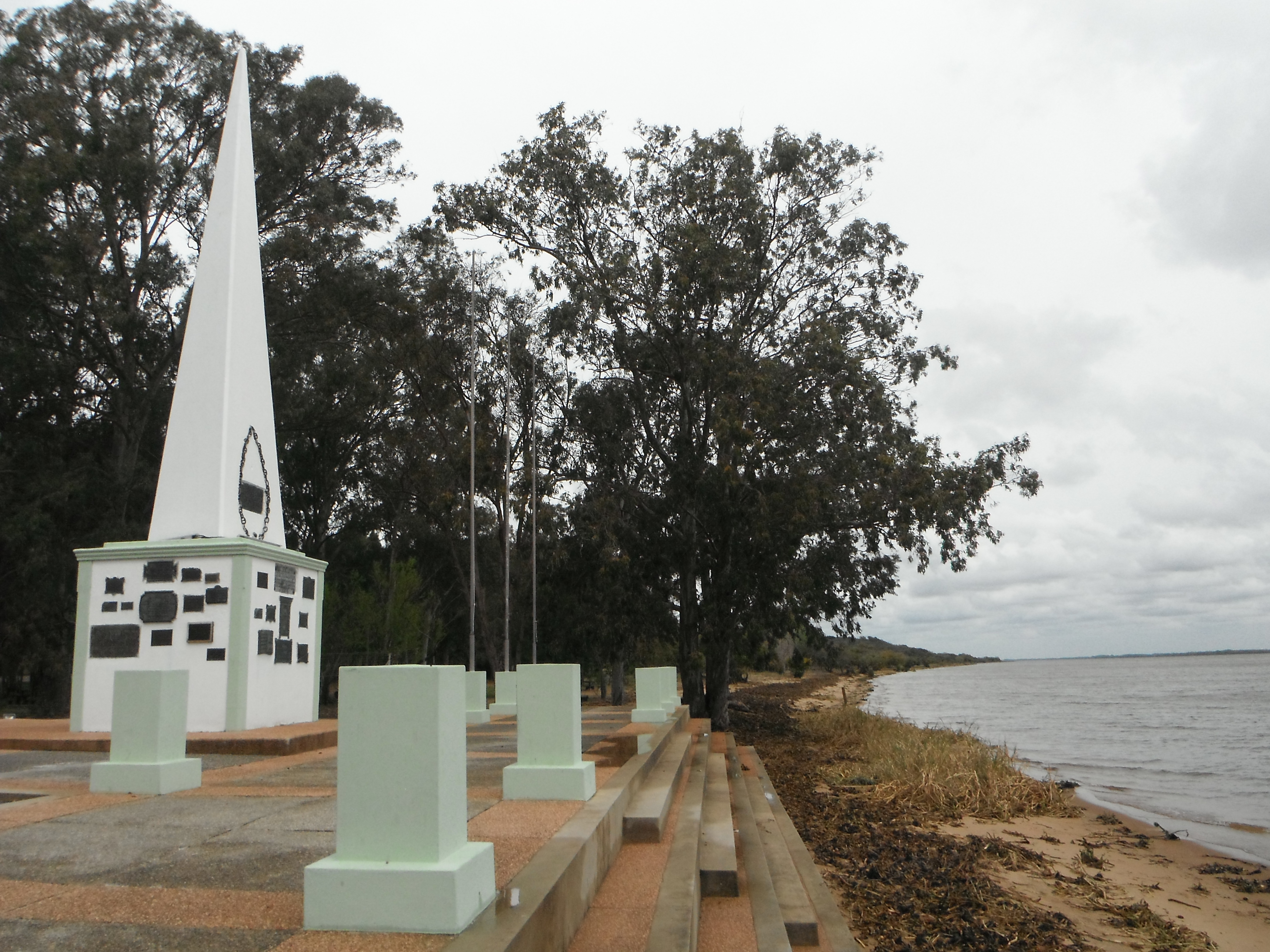
Monument erected in honor of the Thirty-Three Orientals at the exact location of the 1825 landing

Agraciada Beach is a historic beach area in Uruguay. It is situated on the eastern bank of the Uruguay River, within the Soriano Department, on the Uruguayan side of the river, opposite territory in the Argentine province of Entre Ríos.

== History ==
On April 19, 1825, the Thirty-Three Orientals, who were to be credited with liberating Uruguay from Brazilian occupation, landed at Agraciada Beach. This landing of the historic Thirty Three at the beach proved to be one of the significant stages in the establishing the independence of Uruguay.

=== Monument and legacy ===
A monument to the arrival of the Thirty-Three Orientals was erected in 1863 by local landowner don Domingo Ordoñana at the edge of the beach in the 19th century. An avenue near the Palacio Legislativo in Montevideo was formerly named after the Agraciada Beach.

=== Name ===
The beach was formerly known as 'graseada', from 'grasería', (Spanish: 'chandlery'), given the prior existence of a chandlery at that location. The word 'graseada' was later corrupted to the form 'agraciada' (Spanish: 'pretty', 'good looking'), and which was to become the durable form in the name.

== See also ==
- History of Uruguay
- Flag of the Treinta y Tres § Historical background
- Juan Antonio Lavalleja § Historical Legacy
- Domingo Ordoñana#Patron of national commemorations
