= Battle of Umbu =

- Part of the Cisplatine War
Date	16 February 1827
Location	Arroyo Umbu, Empire of Brazil
Result	Brazilian victory

Belligerents
Empire of Brazil	(Argentina) United Provinces

Commanders and leaders
Bento Manuel	Lucio Norberto Mansilla

Strength
858 men	1,190 men

Casualties and losses
10 dead 11 wounded	10 dead 12 wounded

The Battle of Umbu was fought between forces of the United Provinces of the Río de la Plata and the Empire of Brazil, during the Cisplatine War, on 16 February 1827. The Republican force withdrew.

== Background and engagement ==
This battle happened soon after the Battle of Vacacai, and immediately preceded the Battle of Ituzaingó. Following orders from the Brazilian commander, the Marquis of Barbacena, Bento Manuel Ribeiro was riding to Umbu Pass, at the Ibicuí River, ahead of a column, in order to screen the Republican army's movements. On their way there, however, they spotted a force of 1,190 enemy cavalrymen under Lucio Norberto Mansilla to their rear; a detachment under Major Gomes Lisboa was sent to cover their movement, and they engaged the head of the Argentine column briefly, beating it. The Republican forces later tried to cross the river at the Umbu Pass, but were repelled.
