= Battle of Yerbal =

Battle fought in South America on May 25, 1827

- Part of the Cisplatine War
Date	25 May 1827
Location	Near Pedras Altas, Rio Grande do Sul, southern Brazil
Result	Both sides claim victory

Belligerents
Empire of Brazil	(Argentina) United Provinces

Commanders and leaders
Bonifácio Isás Calderón	Juan Lavalle (WIA)

Strength
400	891

Casualties and losses
Unknown	2 wounded

The Battle of Yerbal, also known as the Battle of Erval or Battle of Pedras Altas, was fought on 25 May 1827 between a militia force of the Imperial Brazilian Army and an Argentine cavalry detachment in the context of the Cisplatine War.

== Battle ==
Lieutenant-colonel Bonifácio Isás Calderón, leading 400 militiamen, confronted an 891 men strong Argentine cavalry detachment in the vicinity of Pedras Altas. The Argentine commander, Juan Lavalle, decided to flee and was pursued until the night. Lavalle and captain Maciel, his second in command, were wounded while charging against the Brazilians.

== Bibliography ==
- Donato, Hernâni (1987). Dicionário das Batalhas Brasileiras (in Portuguese). São Paulo: Editora Ibrasa.
- Garcia, Rodolfo (2012). Obras do Barão do Rio Branco VI: efemérides brasileiras (PDF) (in Portuguese). Brasília: Fundação Alexandre de Gusmão. ISBN 978-85-7631-357-1.
- Moreno, Isidoro (2004). Campañas militares argentinas (in Spanish). Vol. I. Buenos Aires: Ed. Emecé. ISBN 950-04-2675-7.
