= Invasion of Chiquitos =

1825 Brazilian military expedition

| Date | 1825 |
| Location | Chiquitos and Moxos, Bolivia |
| Result | Brazilian troops temporarily occupy the region of Chiquitos and Moxos.; Simón Bolívar pledged not to support the Argentines on the issue of Cisplatina. |

Belligerents
| Empire of Brazil: Mato Grosso | Bolivia; Gran Colombia; Supported by: United Provinces |

Commanders and leaders
| Manuel Alves; Manuel de Araújo | Antonio J. de Sucre; Simón Bolívar |

Strength
| Unknown | Unknown |

Casualties and losses
| Unknown | Unknown |

The invasion of Chiquitos was a military expedition carried out by Brazilian forces from the Mato Grosso province of the Empire of Brazil against the Republic of Bolívar. It is said to be a display of force for Simón Bolívar not to support the United Provinces of the Río de la Plata (present-day Argentina) in the ongoing Cisplatine War, although the province acted independently from the central government in Rio de Janeiro without its knowledge or consent.

== Background ==
With the Spanish American Wars of Independence coming to an end, the independentistas or patriots, as the Hispanic South American revolutionaries called themselves, defeated the royalists in the Battle of Ayacucho in 1824. The province of Chiquitos - then part of the Upper Peru region (present-day Bolivia) - was ruled by a royalist governor, colonel Don Sebastián Ramos. After seeing the increasingly threat imposed by the advance of the independentistas nearing his province, Ramos sent a request for annexation to the neighboring Brazilian province of Mato Grosso, hoping that he could maintain his position as governor and for an eventual Spanish reconquest of its former South American dominions. In return the province's revenue would go to the Empire of Brazil after it had been annexed.

With the preparations for the Cisplatine War in 1825, political and military leaders from Rio de Janeiro began to worry that Brazil could win over Argentine forces, given that Brazil had veteran officers from the Peninsular War, the War Against José Gervasio Artigas and the War of Independence, moreover, the forces of the United Provinces of the River Plate were fragile due to the tiring military expeditions in Upper Peru. This ended up with the commander in chief of the Argentine forces, Carlos María de Alvear, send a letter to Simón Bolívar requesting help in the war against Brazil. The exchange of correspondence between Rio-Platenses and Colombians began to raise the suspicion of the Brazilian authorities, especially the governor of Mato Grosso, Manuel Alves da Cunha. In March 1825, Colonel Sebastián Ramos sent Lt. Col. José María Velasco to Mato Grosso, then the province of the Empire of Brazil to offer control of the Chiquitos and Moxos regions to Brazilian control, something that Cunha saw as an opportunity not only to increase the Brazilian presence in the region but also to be a show of strength for the forces of Sucre and Bolívar.

== The Brazilian expedition ==
After the visit of the lieutenant colonel, Alves da Cunha sent troops under the command of Manuel José de Araújo to occupy and subsequently annex the regions to the province of Mato Grosso, an action carried out without the knowledge of the then emperor of Brazil, Pedro I. This action infuriated Bolivian regional leaders, especially General Sucre, who began planning a response action and an eventual invasion of the province of Mato Grosso, something that Bolívar prevented, since he believed that the Brazilian emperor did not know about this action.

== Diplomatic mission between Argentines and Bolivians ==
With the Brazilian expedition, the Argentine leaders sent a diplomatic mission to the Republic of Bolívar, to discuss the Brazilian situation, since it was now a problem for both nations. This was the Alvear-Diaz Velez Mission, which was led by the Argentine diplomats Carlos Maria de Alvear and José Miguel Díaz Vélez. They sought to convince Bolivar to lead an alliance of Colombia, Peru, Upper Peru, and Argentina (United Provinces of the River Plate). The Argentines argued that Colombians, Bolivians and Argentines should unite against Brazil and subsequently divide the nation into several republics, thus making Great Colombia the dominant power in South America, in addition, the United Provinces would annex part of the Mato Grosso and southern Brazil, something that would facilitate an expedition against Paraguay to overthrow the Paraguayan warlord José Gaspar Rodríguez de Francia, in addition to eventually annexing Paraguay. This plan would also end the European constitutional monarchical system in South America, strengthening the republican model in the region, something of interest to the Venezuelan leader. However, Bolívar refused and maintained a certain prudence, preferring a more diplomatic solution. Bolivar's reticence was driven by his concern that a Hispanic alliance could trigger a similar reaction among European powers to held defend Brazil.

== Resolution ==
Bolivar was also compelled to act in response to the Brazilian aggression. He organized a small Peruvian-led force to recover Chiquitos, a strategy designed to avoid a bigger confrontation with Brazil. The troops was delayed by seasonal rains, an event that allowed Brazil to withdraw to Mato Grosso. With the increase in tensions, the Brazilian emperor, D. Pedro I, became aware of the situation on the border and the increase in political movements of the neighbors. This was the reason behind his order to disengage and withdraw the Brazilian forces from the region, which prevented a major conflict with its Hispanic neighbors. However, before the withdrawal of the Brazilian force, it plundered some localities on the borders, in addition, Pedro replaced Alves Cunha with José Saturnino da Costa Pereira, to avoid any problems. The action of the Brazilian emperor was favorably seen by the Venezuelan liberator, who pledged to deny the Argentines' proposal and to maintain cordial relations with Brazil. This solution to the question is seen as a Brazilian political victory, which, in addition to guaranteeing its interests in the region, prevented a possible affirmative answer from Bolívar.

== Consequences ==
The Brazilian expedition alerted the countries of South America that they were vulnerable after the war against Spain, something that would become one of the reasons for the Congress of Panama.

The governor left his office and went to live on a farm near the border with Brazil.

== See also ==
- Acre War
- Platine War
- Republic of New Granada
- Peru–Bolivian Confederation
- Chaco War
- Argentine Confederation

== Bibliography ==
- Soares, Maria do Socorro Castro (2018). "Repercussões e especulações: o Império brasileiro sob a ótica da anexação da província de Chiquitos" (PDF) (in Portuguese).
