= Flag of the Treinta y Tres =

Flag of the Thirty-Three
- Treinta y Tres
- Use: National flag
- Proportion: 2:3
- Adopted: August 26, 1825
- Design: Three horizontal stripes: the top one blue, the center one white, and the bottom one red. Upon the white stripe are printed the words Libertad o Muerte ('Freedom or Death').

The flag of the Treinta y Tres is one of the three official flags of Uruguay, along with the national flag of Uruguay and the Artigas flag. Inspired on the flag of the Oriental Province with an added motto it was first used in 1825 in the military expedition of the Treinta y Tres Orientales meant to free the country from Brazilian occupation. In 1952 it was officialized as a national symbol of Uruguay.

== Historical background ==
The flag of the Treinta y Tres pays homage to the military expedition of the Treinta y Tres Orientales ('Thirty-Three Orientals'), an insurgent revolutionary group led by Juan Antonio Lavalleja and Manuel Oribe which fought against the Empire of Brazil during the Brazilian occupation of the Provincia Oriental. The flag was first used during the disembarkation of the Thirty-Three Orientals in Uruguayan territory on 19 April 1825, at the beginning of the Cisplatine War.

== Symbolism and design ==
The design features three horizontal stripes: the top stripe, blue, represents greatness; the center one, white, is a symbol of the Republic; and the bottom one, red, honors the blood of those who died for freedom and independence. Uruguay's national motto Libertad o Muerte ("Freedom or Death") reads on the center stripe.

=== Official standing with other flags ===
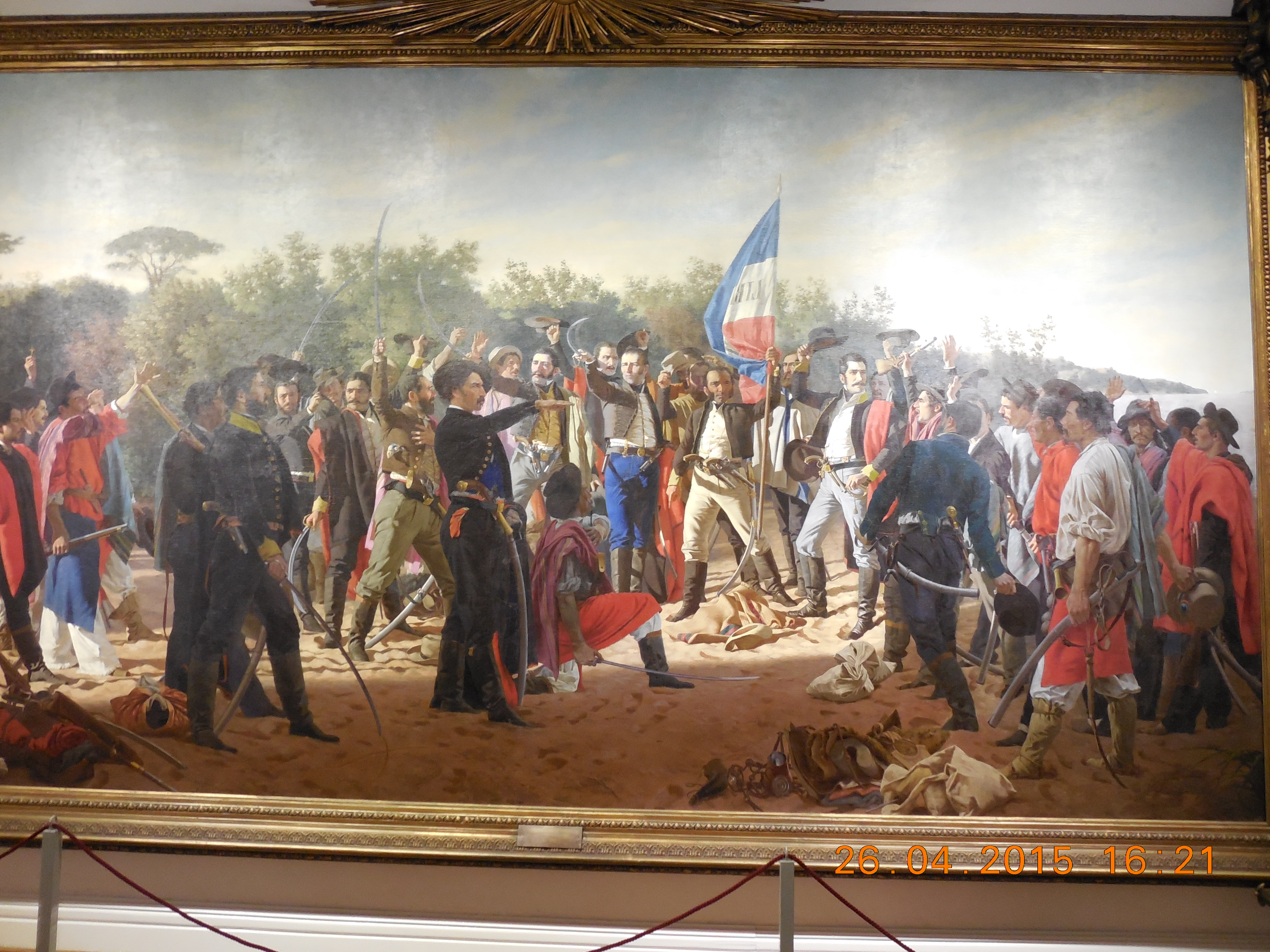
Sacrament of the Thirty-Three Orientals, by Juan Manuel Blanes. The flag is visible in the center of the painting.

By law the Flag of the Treinta y Tres must be flown alongside the National Flag and the Artigas flag in all government buildings on national holidays.

== Historical lost flag ==
In 1969, an original surviving flag from the Cisplatine War was stolen by the revolutionary group OPR-33. The flag was taken from the history museum and last seen in 1975, but has been considered missing since February 1969.
