= Manuel José García =

Argentine politician, lawyer, economist and diplomat

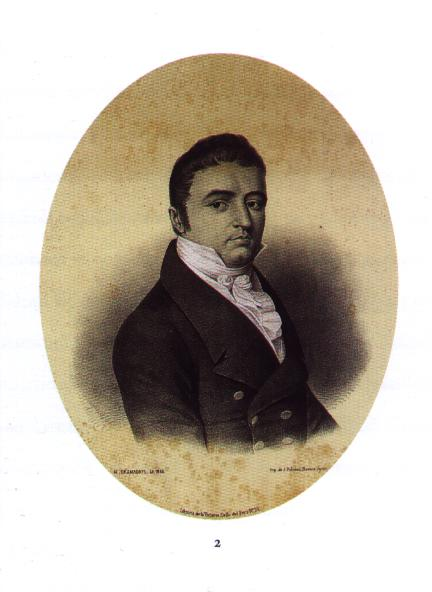
- Born: October 11, 1784; Viceroyalty of the Río de la Plata (Spanish Empire)
- Died: October 22, 1848 (age 64); Buenos Aires (Argentina)
- Burial place: Recoleta Cemetery; 34°35′17″S 58°23′35″W
- Education: National School of Buenos Aires; Universidad Mayor, Real y Pontificia San Francisco Xavier de Chuquisaca
- Spouses: Manuela Juana Aguirre; Alonso de Lajarrota (m. 1825)
- Children: Manuel Rafael García Aguirre

Manuel Jose Garcia Ferreyra (Buenos Aires 1784–1848) was an Argentine politician, lawyer, economist and diplomat.
