= Battle of Vacacai =

1827 battle of the Cisplatine War in Brazil

- Part of the Cisplatine War
| Date | February 13, 1827 |
| Location | Vacacaí River, Rio Grande do Sul, southern Brazil |
| Result | Brazilian victory (Note: It is claimed as a victory by the Argentines.) |

Belligerents
| Empire of Brazil | (Argentina) United Provinces |

Commanders and leaders
| Marcelino do Amaral | Juan Lavalle |

Strength
| 270 | 800 |

Casualties and losses
| 2 killed 3 wounded | 22 killed |

The Battle of Vacacai, also known as the Battle of Bacacay or Vacacay, was a small skirmish fought on 13 February 1827 between a small militia cavalry force of the Imperial Brazilian Army and an Argentine detachment in the context of the Cisplatine War.

== Battle ==
Lieutenant Marcelino Ferreira do Amaral, leading a cavalry force of 70 militiamen, surprised an Argentine detachment of 100 men, who fled, leaving two officers and 20 soldiers killed during the shock and the chase that ensued. However, col. Lavalle, with a 700 strong cavalry force, came to help the republicans, to which Lt. Amaral decided to withdraw and join forces with his commander, the Major Gabriel Gomes Lisboa, that only had 200 militiamen under his command. Still unable to fight Lavalle, Lisboa continued the retreat until he met Col. Bento Manuel Ribeiro, head of the brigade to which Lisboa belonged. In this retreat the imperials had two killed and three wounded. Lavalle backed away as soon as he saw Bento Manuel's column.

== Bibliography ==
- Donato, Hernâni (1987). Dicionário das Batalhas Brasileiras (in Portuguese). São Paulo: Editora Ibrasa.
- Garcia, Rodolfo (2012). Obras do Barão do Rio Branco VI: efemérides brasileiras (in Portuguese). Brasília: Fundação Alexandre de Gusmão. ISBN 978-85-7631-357-1.
- Ruiz Moreno, Isidoro J. (2004). Campañas militares argentinas (in Spanish). Vol. I. Buenos Aires: Ed. Emecé. ISBN 950-04-2675-7.
