= Thirty-Three Orientals =

1820s revolutionary group in the Empire of Brazil; founders of modern Uruguay

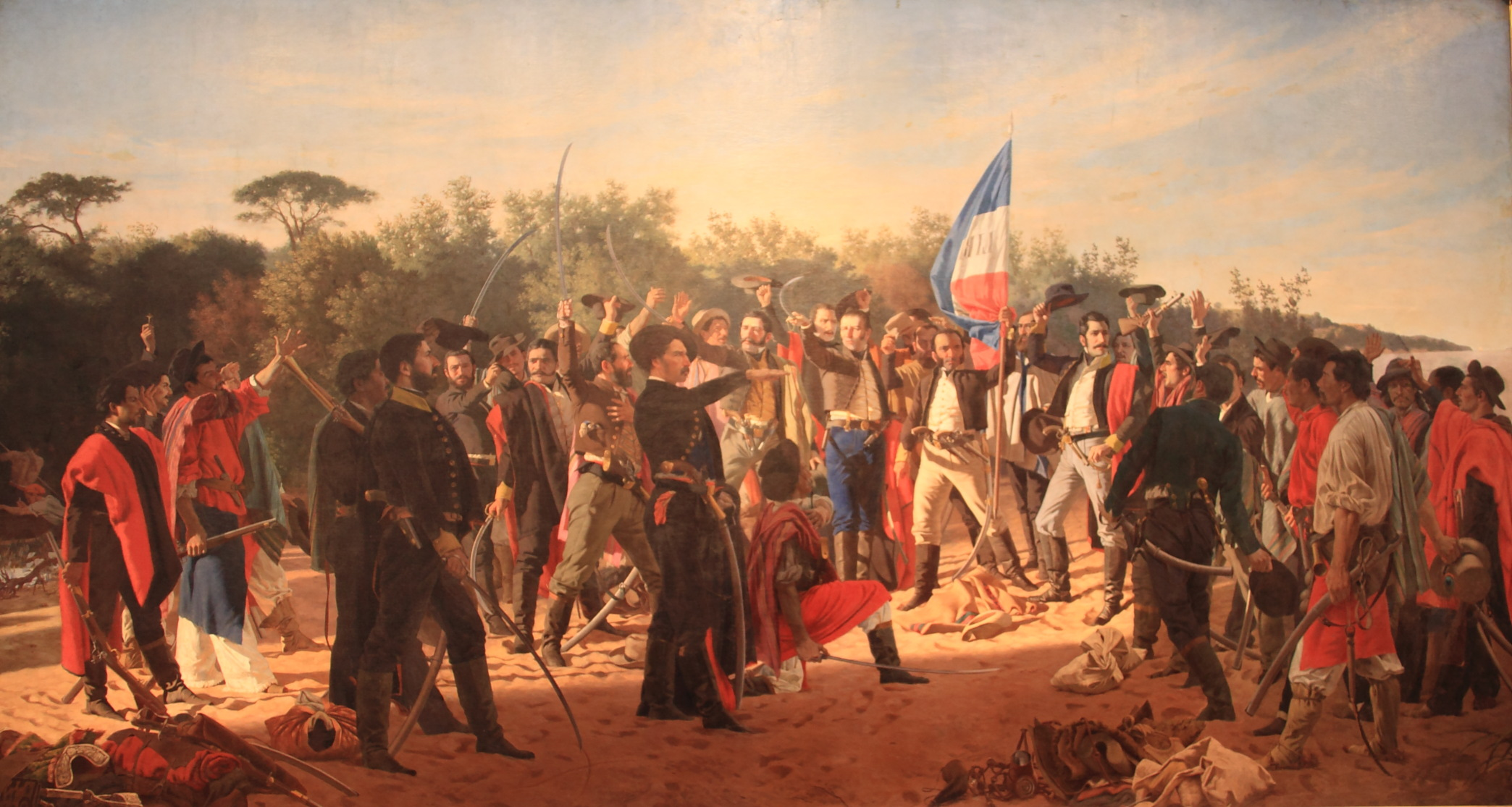
Oath of the Thirty-Three Orientals, on April 19, 1825 in the Agraciada Beach of the Uruguay River.

The Treinta y Tres Orientales (English: Thirty-Three Orientals or Thirty-Three Easterners) were a revolutionary group led by Juan Antonio Lavalleja and Manuel Oribe that started an insurrection against the Empire of Brazil during the Brazilian occupation of the Provincia Oriental. Their actions started in with the crossing of the Uruguay River on the night of April 19, 1825, an event that marked the beginning of the Cisplatine War, and culminated in the foundation of modern Uruguay.

== Background ==
Between 1816 and 1820, the United Kingdom of Portugal, Brazil and the Algarves invaded and occupied the post-Spanish Provincia Oriental. These Luso-Brazilian forces easily defeated the resistance of the forces of José Gervasio Artigas who, when routed, had to abandon the province in 1820, and went into self-exile in Paraguay.

In February 1824 Oriental Province was annexed under the name Cisplatina Province by newly independent Brazil. It had held the same name under the former Portuguese colonial administration. Previously, a separatist movement (1822–1823) directed by various partisans of the United Provinces of the Río de la Plata (present day Argentina) had been subdued by the Brazilians. The goal of the doomed movement had been the unification of Cisplatina with the United Provinces.

== Organization ==
One of the military leaders of the partisans, Lavalleja, who had fought together with Artigas against the Portuguese and Brazilians, organized a new military expedition, from Buenos Aires Province to Cisplatina Province. The goal was again to expel the Brazilians and unite Cisplatina Province with the United Provinces of the Río de la Plata.

The expedition relied on the help of some ranchers and beef-curers from Buenos Aires Province who saw the Brazilian occupation of Cisplatina Province as a danger to their interests. The beef-curers had seen their regional markets impaired through competition with their neighbors at Rio Grande do Sul, who were supplied with cattle from Cisplatina. Juan Manuel de Rosas, a characteristic member of this group, became an important financier of the anti-Brazilian movement.

== Landing ==
On April 1, 1825, an advance party led by Manuel Oribe set sail from the port of San Isidro and landed at the Brazo Largo island on the Paraná River. The bulk of the men left soon afterwards, but due to bad weather could only join them on April 15.

After nightfall, on April 18, Lavalleja and his men advanced carefully among the isles of the Paraná Delta, evading the vigil of the Brazilian flotilla. They crossed the Río Uruguay in two boats and disembarked at Agraciada Beach, also known as "Arenal Grande", at dawn on April 19. There they planted what would become known as the Bandera de los Treinta y Tres Orientales (Flag of the Thirty-Three Easterners), a flag of blue, white, and red horizontal bars. These colors had been traditional since the times of Artigas, not only in Oriental Province but also in others of the Río de la Plata region.

Long afterwards, in 1877, the event would be portrayed by the painter Juan Manuel Blanes, in El Juramento de los Treinta y Tres Orientales (Oath of the Thirty-Three Orientals), one of the images most deeply inscribed in the historical memory of Uruguayans. Blanes often addressed historical themes in his works, and in this case achieved detailed renderings of the protagonists' faces, interviewing some survivors and taking extensive notes.

== Campaign ==
Flag of the Treinta y Tres.

The military expedition of the Treinta y Tres proceeded to attract countryside inhabitants to the cause of freedom from the Brazilians, and made its way to Montevideo, where it arrived on May 20, 1825. On June 14, in the town of La Florida it installed a provisional government which in turn held an election of representatives. This was known as Representatives' Hall, or more commonly as the Florida Assembly. The goal of the assembly was to rewrite the laws of Oriental Province.

On August 25 the assembly declared the independence of Oriental Province from Brazil, and its allegiance to the United Provinces of the Río de la Plata. The United Provinces recognized the incorporation of Oriental Province on October 24, 1825. This instigated a declaration of war by the Empire of Brazil in December of the same year. The Cisplatine War had begun.

This conflict lasted until August 1828. After mediation by Viscount Ponsonby, a British diplomat, Oriental Province was established as a state independent of both the United Provinces and the Brazilian Empire. This accord was the foundation of modern Uruguay. Known as the Preliminary Peace Convention, it was affirmed on August 27, 1828.

== Number and identities of the Treinta y Tres Orientales ==
The true number of the group has been the object of controversy, based on the existence of various lists of members, published between 1825 and 1832. While thirty-three is the officially accepted number, the names differ from list to list; it is unclear whether these differing names may be nicknames of the true members. According to Jacinto Carranza, who compared extant lists for his 1946 book ¿Cuántos eran los Treinta y Tres? (How Many Were the Thirty-Three?), Santiago Gadea is a name appearing in every list.

Although called Orientales, not everyone was from Oriental Province. Among them were various Argentines from the isles of Paraná, as well as Paraguayans and one person born in Mozambique.

== See also ==
- Flag of the Treinta y Tres
- Agraciada Beach#Historical association
- Cisplatine War
- José Gervasio Artigas
- Artigas flag
- Empire of Brazil
- Juan Antonio Lavalleja
- History of Uruguay
- Treinta y Tres
- Virgin of the Thirty-Three
