= Dissolution of parliament =

Dispersal of a legislature

The dissolution of a legislative assembly (or parliament) is the simultaneous termination of service of all of its members, in anticipation that a successive legislative assembly will reconvene later with possibly different members. In a democracy, the new assembly is chosen by a general election. Dissolution is distinct on the one hand from abolition of the assembly, and on the other hand from its adjournment or prorogation, or the ending of a legislative session, any of which begins a period of inactivity after which it is anticipated that the same members will reassemble. For example, the "second session of the fifth parliament" could be followed by the "third session of the fifth parliament" after the close of a session, but would be followed by the "first session of the sixth parliament" after a dissolution.

In most Continental European countries, dissolution does not have immediate effect – that is, a dissolution merely triggers an election, but the old assembly itself remains capable of functioning and continues its existing term, with its members remaining in office, until the new assembly convenes for the first time. In those systems, ordinarily scheduled elections are held before the assembly reaches the end of a fixed or maximum term, and do not require a dissolution.

In most Westminster systems, however, a dissolution legally ends the existence of the assembly, resulting in a temporary power vacuum, which may be filled in special circumstances by recalling the old assembly if need be. Because of this peculiarity, Westminster systems also have automatically-triggered dissolutions when the assembly reaches the end of a fixed or maximum term, since the act of dissolution itself is synonymous with the end of the assembly's term, and elections cannot be held in anticipation of a dissolution.

Early dissolutions may be possible in parliamentary and semi-presidential systems, to resolve conflicts between the executive and the legislature; either a "snap election" called by an executive seeking to increase its legislative support, or an election triggered by parliament withholding confidence and supply from the government. Some presidential systems also allow early dissolutions, usually by the legislature voting to dissolve itself (as in Cyprus), but sometimes by executive action in more authoritarian presidential systems, or, as in Ecuador's muerte cruzada, the president dissolving the legislature at the cost of facing a new election themselves.

In a bicameral legislature, dissolution may apply jointly or separately to the lower house and upper house, or may apply only to the lower house, with the upper house never fully dissolved. In a bicameral Westminster system, the expression "dissolution of parliament" typically refers to the dissolution of the lower house, just as "member of parliament" means member of the lower house.

== Australia ==
The House of Representatives, but not the Senate, can be dissolved at any time by the governor-general on the advice of the prime minister. The term of the House expires three years after its first meeting if not dissolved earlier. The governor-general can dissolve the Senate only by also dissolving the House of Representatives (a double dissolution) and only in limited circumstances spelled out in the Constitution.

There is a convention that the Governor-General only orders a dissolution on the advice of the prime minister. This convention was demonstrated in the dismissal of prime minister Gough Whitlam by Governor General Sir John Kerr in 1975. Kerr claimed that dissolving the House of Representatives was his duty and "the only democratic and constitutional solution" to the political deadlock over supply. Whitlam refused to advise Kerr to call an election, and Kerr replaced him with a caretaker prime minister, Malcolm Fraser. Fraser promptly advised a double dissolution, and Sir John acted in accordance with that advice.

=== Parliament of Victoria ===
Unlike the Commonwealth Parliament, the premier and governor of Victoria have very little discretion in dissolving the Parliament of Victoria. Both the Legislative Assembly and the Legislative Council are dissolved automatically twenty-five days before the last Saturday in November every four years. However, the governor can dissolve the Legislative Assembly if a motion of no confidence in the premier and the other ministers of state is passed and no motion of confidence is passed within the next week. Finally, the premier can advise the governor to dissolve both houses in the case of a deadlocked bill.

== Bangladesh ==
In Bangladesh, the dissolution of the Parliament is governed by Article 72 of the Constitution, which states that Parliament shall be summoned, prorogued, and dissolved by the President through public notification. The President exercises this power based on the written advice of the Prime Minister.

Following the dissolution, general elections must be conducted within 90 days. The newly elected Parliament is required to convene within 30 days after the publication of election results.

A notable instance occurred on August 6, 2024, when President Mohammed Shahabuddin dissolved Parliament after Prime Minister Sheikh Hasina's resignation amid a mass uprising which led to the formation of an interim government tasked with overseeing the country until new elections could be organized.

Although, Bangladesh’s constitution does not provide explicit provisions for an interim government following such a dissolution, leading to a constitutional crisis during the period. The interim government established a Constitutional Reform Commission to draft a new constitution and prepare for constituent assembly elections.

== Belgium ==
In Belgium, dissolution occurs either by royal order or by law upon a Declaration of Revision of the Constitution (Art. 195 Const.). Since the First World War, elections have always been called with either of these actions, except for 1929. A third scenario, dissolution by law due to a vacant throne, has never occurred.

Dissolution by law dissolves both the Chamber of Representatives and the Senate. A royal order originally could dissolve the Chamber, the Senate, or both. However, the last dissolution of one chamber only happened in 1884; both chambers were always dissolved together since then. With the 1993 constitutional reforms, only the Chamber could be dissolved, with the Senate being automatically dissolved as well. Since 2014 constitutional reforms, only the Chamber can be dissolved, as the Senate is no longer directly elected.

After dissolution, elections must be held within 40 days, and the new chambers must convene within three months (within two months from 1831 to 2014).

Parliaments of the regions and communities cannot be dissolved; they have fixed five-year terms.

== Brazil ==
Under the current constitution, there is no formal way to dissolve the Federal Senate or the Chamber of Deputies (Houses of the National Congress).

=== Imperial Era ===
In May 1823, eight months after Independence, the first brazilian legislative experience began, with the installation of the General, Constituent and Legislative Assembly, with the task of drafting the country's first Constitution. Six months later, in confrontation with the Deputies, Emperor Dom Pedro dissolved the assembly, ordered the arrest and exile of some deputies and created a Council of State to draft the Constitution, which he signed in 1824.

This was the first of the eighteen times that the legislature was dissolved, the Imperial Constitution and its quasi-parliamentary model formalized the Emperor's power to dissolve the Chamber of Deputies (the Senate was not elected). During the Regency and reign of Dom Pedro II, the Chamber of Deputies was dissolved on several occasions, almost always when the clash between conservatives and liberals or between legislators and the Council of Ministers reached a degree considered too high by the Emperor.

=== First Republic ===
After the Proclamation of the Republic, in 1889, a Constituent Congress was convened to prepare the first republican charter, which came into force in 1891. However, on 3 November of that year, the National Congress would be closed by President Deodoro da Fonseca, with the legislature reinstated after the attempt was deemed a coup and he resigned.

=== Vargas Era ===
The legislature was closed twice by Getúlio Vargas. After the Revolution of 1930, as Head of the Provisional Government, Vargas dissolved the National Congress, the state legislative assemblies and the municipal chambers. Pressured by the failed Constitutionalist Revolution, Vargas was forced to call elections for a National Constituent Assembly.

On 10 November 1937, now President of the Republic elected by the same National Congress, Vargas staged a coup d'état, establishing the Estado Novo. He closed the legislature and instituted a new, authoritarian Constitution. Despite the new charter determining the convening of a "National Parliament" with a appointed Federal Council and a Chamber of Deputies that could be dissolved, elections were never held.

=== Republican Parliamentarism ===
During the brief parliamentary experience from 1961 to 1963 as a way to allow the inauguration of President João Goulart under strong political and military opposition, the Additional Act to the Constitution determined that "[v]erified the impossibility of maintaining the Council of Ministers for lack of parliamentary support, proven in motions of no confidence, consecutively opposed to three Councils, the President of the Republic may dissolve the Chamber of Deputies[...]".

The then President of the Republic never exercised this attribution and the return to the presidential system stripped him of any competence to dissolve the Chamber of Deputies.

=== Military dictatorship ===
During the twenty-one years of the military dictatorship (1964–1985), the National Congress was "suspended" three times. Institutional Act No. 2 (AI-2) gave the President of the Republic the power to decree the recess of the two Houses of the National Congress, and during this period he had the prerogative to legislate.

On 20 October 1966, President Castelo Branco decreed recess for a month, to contain a "grouping of counter-revolutionary elements" (the 1964 Coup d'Etat was considered a revolution by the military) that had formed in the legislature "with the aim of disrupting public peace". On 13 December 1968, President Costa e Silva issued AI-5, an institutional act that began the most repressive and violent period of the dictatorship, closing the National Congress to combat subversion and "ideologies contrary to the traditions of our people ".

The last person to decree the closure of the legislature was President Ernesto Geisel, in 1977, through the "April package", after the National Congress rejected a constitutional amendment. Geisel alleged that the MDB (then the opposition party on a unequal bipartisanship controlled by the military) had established a "minority dictatorship".

== Canada ==
The House of Commons, but not the Senate, can be dissolved at any time by the King of Canada or by the Governor General on the advice of the prime minister. If the government is refused confidence or supply, the prime minister must either resign and permit a leader of another party to form a government, or else advise the governor general to dissolve Parliament. Also, the House of Commons typically dissolves within five years; however, in circumstances such as war, invasion, or insurrection, Parliament may extend this period. A continuation longer than five years requires approval by more than two-thirds of the House of Commons members or the legislative assembly.

The provincial legislatures may also be dissolved at any time for the same reasons, by the King of Canada or the Lieutenant Governor on the advice of the provincial premier. Most provinces and territories have established fixed election dates.

== Czech Republic ==
The Chamber of Deputies of the Czech Republic may be dissolved by the president when at least one condition specified by the constitution is fulfilled. The Senate can never be dissolved. After the dissolution, snap elections are to be held no later than after 60 days.

The chamber can be dissolved if

- The chamber does not pass a motion of confidence to the government formed by the prime minister who was recommended by the speaker of the chamber (Who can do so after 2 failed government with a prime minister appointed solely by the president).
- The chamber fails to pass the government proposed law linked to the motion of confidence in 3 months.
- The chamber adjourns its meeting for a time longer than 120 days.
- The chamber is not quorate for a time longer than 3 months.
- The chamber passes a motion of dissolution by a constitutional majority (120 out of 200 deputies must support it). President is obliged to dissolve the chamber if such motion passes.

Since the formation of the Czech Republic, the Chamber of Deputies was only dissolved once. In 2013, by passing a motion of dissolution after a lengthy crisis following the fall of Petr Nečas' government,

Before such practice was made possible by amending the Constitution in 2009, Chamber of Deputies was once dissolved in 1998 by passing a special constitutional act, which shortened its term, but such practice was blocked by the Constitutional Court, when it was tried again in 2009

== Denmark ==
The government can call an election to the Folketing at any time, and is obliged to call one before the incumbent membership's four-year terms expire. However, the Folketing is never formally dissolved, and it retains its legislative power until new members have been elected. In practice the Folketing will cancel all its ongoing business when an election is called, to give the members time to campaign, but it can reconvene in case a national emergency requires urgent legislation before the election takes place.

== Ecuador ==
Article 148 of the 2008 Constitution of Ecuador grants the president the power to dissolve the National Assembly, but only at the price of also triggering a fresh election for the president. The mechanism, known as muerte cruzada requires that a special election be held following dissolution, in which a new president and vice-president and a new National Assembly are elected. The candidates elected – to both the executive and legislative branches – then serve out the remainder of the current presidential and legislative terms.

The first and only invocation of the dissolution was during the 2023 Ecuadorian political crisis when president Guillermo Lasso, undergoing impeachment proceedings in the National Assembly, dissolved the legislative body. Lasso was eligible to run for re-election, but chose not to. Daniel Noboa, his elected successor and the newly elected National Assembly in 2023 will serve out the rest of the term until 2025.

== Estonia ==
Per Section 60 of the Constitution of Estonia, regular elections to the Riigikogu, Estonia's unicameral parliament, are held on the first Sunday of March in the fourth year following the preceding parliamentary election. However, the Riigikogu can be dissolved by the President of Estonia and fresh elections called prior to the expiration of its four-year term if one of the following four circumstances should occur:

1. Following the resignation of the outgoing Government, a new Government is unable to be formed according to the procedure established by Section 89 of the Constitution.
2. The Riigikogu passes a motion of no confidence in the Government or the prime minister, and the Government proposes (within three days of the no-confidence motion) that the President call an early election.
3. The Riigikogu submits a proposed law to a referendum, and that proposed law fails to receive a majority of the votes cast in the referendum, per Section 105 of the Constitution.
4. The Riigikogu fails to approve a national budget within two months of the beginning of the financial year, per Section 119 of the Constitution.

In the first, third, and fourth cases above, the President must call an early election. In the second case, however, a Government that has lost the confidence of the Riigikogu is not obliged to request an early election. This occurred in 2016, when Prime Minister Taavi Rõivas lost a no confidence motion. His government resigned, and President Kersti Kaljulaid nominated Jüri Ratas to form the next government without an election taking place.

Likewise, if a Government loses a no confidence vote and requests an early election, the President can refuse the Government's request if it appears a successor government could command the support of the Riigikogu.

As of 2018, every convocation of the Riigikogu has run its full term.

== Finland ==
The President of Finland can dissolve the parliament and call for an early election. As per the version of the 2000 constitution currently in use, the president can do this only upon proposal by the prime minister and after consultations with the parliamentary groups while the Parliament is in session. In prior versions of the constitution, the President had the power to do this unilaterally.

== France ==
Under the French Fourth Republic formed after World War II, there was originally a weak role for the president of France. However, when Charles de Gaulle, who favored a presidential government with a strong executive, was invited to form a new government and constitution during the May 1958 crisis he directed the constitutional committee chaired by Michel Debré to increase the authority of the presidency, including providing the ability to dissolve the National Assembly.

Under Article 12 of the 1958 French Constitution, the National Assembly can be dissolved by the President at any time after consultation with the prime minister and the presidents of the two chambers of Parliament. After the declaration, new elections must be held within twenty to forty days. The National Assembly elected following such a dissolution cannot be dissolved within the first year of its term.

A dissolution of the National Assembly most recently occurred when in June 2024, when President Emmanuel Macron dissolved the National Assembly to prompt the 2024 French legislative election. President Jacques Chirac previously dissolved the National Assembly before the 1997 French legislative election in order to secure a new parliament more sympathetic to his policies, which ultimately failed when the opposition Socialist Party won the election against Chirac's party the Rally for the Republic.

== Germany ==
According to the Basic Law, the Bundestag can be dissolved by the federal president if the chancellor loses a vote of confidence, or if a newly elected Bundestag proves unable to elect a chancellor even after a multi-phase election process (which initially requires an absolute majority but only a relative majority in subsequent ballots). The second possibility has never occurred, but the Bundestag was dissolved in 1972, 1982, 2005 and 2024 when the then-ruling chancellors Willy Brandt, Helmut Kohl, Gerhard Schröder and Olaf Scholz deliberately lost votes of confidence in order that there could be fresh elections. In 1982 and 2005, the decree of dissolution was challenged without success before the Constitutional Court. No president has yet refused a dissolution of the Bundestag when the choice came to him.

The Bundestag is automatically dissolved four years after the last general election, and most Bundestags have lasted the full term.

The second federal legislative body, the Bundesrat, cannot be dissolved; its members are appointed by the federal states' governments rather than elected.

== Hong Kong ==
The chief executive, who is the head of the territory and head of government, has the power to dissolve the Legislative Council under Article 51 of the Hong Kong Basic Law:

- if the Legislative Council fails to pass the appropriation bill or any other important bill; or
- if Legislative Council passes a bill but the chief executive refuses to give assent and returns the bill, after which the Council passes the bill again with a two-thirds majority and the Chief Executive again refuses to give assent.

Before the handover of Hong Kong in 1997, the Legislative Council could be dissolved any time at the governor's pleasure.

== India ==
Legislative power is constitutionally vested in the Parliament of India, of which the President is the head, to facilitate the law-making process as per the Constitution. The President summons both the Houses (the Lok Sabha and the Rajya Sabha) of the parliament and prorogues them. They also have the power to dissolve the Lok Sabha pursuant to Article 75(2)(b). When Parliament is dissolved, all bills pending within the Lok Sabha lapse. However, bills in the Rajya Sabha never lapse, and can remain pending for decades.

== Indonesia ==
The Constitution of Indonesia prohibits President to dissolve the House of Representatives. This principle was originally written in the explanatory memorandum to the Constitution but was moved to the main body (precisely in article 7C) since the explanatory memorandum was eliminated in the Third Amendment.

Despite this, there was a constitutional crisis in 2001 when President Abdurrahman Wahid attempted to prorogue the DPR on 23 July 2001 through a presidential decree.

== Republic of Ireland ==
Dáil Éireann (the lower house of the Oireachtas) can be dissolved by the President, on the advice of the taoiseach (prime minister). The president may only deny such a dissolution if the taoiseach has lost the confidence of the Dáil, through a vote of no confidence (or, it could be argued after a Budget or other important bill has failed to pass). This has never happened, and, in the past, taoisigh have requested dissolutions before votes of no confidence have taken place, so as to force a general election rather than a handover of Government. A Dáil must be dissolved, and then a general election held, within five years of its first meeting.

There are two notable instances when the President did not dissolve Dáil Éireann: 1989 and 1994. In the first instance, the newly elected Dáil failed to elect a Taoiseach when it first met (and at a number of meetings afterward). The incumbent taoiseach Charles Haughey was obliged constitutionally to resign, however, he initially refused to. He eventually tendered his resignation to President Patrick Hillery and remained as taoiseach in an acting capacity. At the fourth attempt, the Dáil eventually re-elected Haughey as taoiseach. Had he requested a dissolution, it would probably have been accepted by the President on the grounds that the Dáil could not form a Government, but the President would have also been within his rights to refuse it. It is thought that Haughey chose not to do so but instead to go into a historic coalition because of poor opinion polls showing his Fianna Fáil party would lose seats in a second General Election.

In 1994, Albert Reynolds resigned as taoiseach when the Labour Party left a coalition with Fianna Fáil, but did not request a dissolution, in order that his successor in Fianna Fáil might forge a new coalition with Labour. Labour, however, went into Government with the main opposition party, Fine Gael. It has been speculated that the president at the time, Mary Robinson, would not have allowed a dissolution had Reynolds requested one. To date, no president has ever refused a dissolution.

One feature of the Irish system is that although the Dáil is dissolved, the Seanad Éireann (the Senate) is not, and may continue to meet during an election campaign for the Dáil. However, as many members of the Seanad are typically involved in election campaigns for the Dáil, the Seanad does not typically meet often, if at all, once the Dáil is dissolved. A general election for the Seanad must take place within 90 days of the election of the new Dáil.

== Israel ==
In Israel, early elections to the Knesset can be called before the scheduled date of the third Tuesday in the Jewish month of Cheshvan (late September through early November) four years after the previous elections if the prime minister calls early elections with Presidential approval due to gridlock, if no government is formed after 42 days of consultation with parties' floor leaders in the Knesset, if the budget is not approved by the Knesset by 31 March (3 months after the start of the fiscal year), or if half of the Knesset members vote in favor of early elections. This call for early elections is legally called the "Dissolution of the Knesset".

However, strictly speaking, the Knesset is only truly dissolved – in the sense of being unconstituted and all MKs losing their seats – automatically 14 days after elections, simultaneously with the start of the newly elected Knesset's term.

== Italy ==
The president of Italy has the authority to dissolve parliament, and consequently call for new elections, until which the powers of the old parliament are extended; however, the President loses this authority during the so-called semestre bianco, the last six months of his seven-year term, unless that period coincides at least in part with the final six months of the Parliament's five-year term, as stated in Article 88 of the Constitution of Italy: "In consultation with the presiding officers of Parliament, the President may dissolve one or both Houses of Parliament. The President of the Republic may not exercise such right during the final six months of the presidential term unless said period coincides in full or in part with the final six months of Parliament."

After the resignation of the Cabinet of Italy, which can be freely decided by the prime minister, or caused by a vote of no confidence by the Parliament, or after general elections, the President has to consult the speakers of the two houses of Parliament, the delegations of the parliamentary groups, and senators for life to find someone who might be appointed prime minister and lead a new government with the confidence of both Houses. The President dissolves Parliament only if the groups fail to find an agreement to form a majority coalition; the actual power of dissolution is in practice also shared by the Parliament, political parties, and by the outgoing prime minister. Since the Constitution of Italy came into force in 1948, the Italian Parliament has been dissolved nine times before the end of its five-year term, in 1972, 1976, 1979, 1983, 1987, 1994, 1996, 2008 and 2022.

== Japan ==
In Japan, the House of Representatives of the National Diet (parliament) can be dissolved at any time by the emperor, on the advice of the Cabinet, headed by the prime minister. The Constitution of Japan specifies that all members of the House can serve up to a four-year term. So far, however, parliaments have been dissolved prematurely with the exception of 9 December 1976 and 31 October 2021 dissolution.

The House of Councillors, however, cannot be dissolved but only closed, and may, in times of national emergency, be convoked for an emergency session. Its members serve a fixed six-year term, with half of the seats, and the Speaker of the Councillors, up for re-election every three years.

The emperor both convokes the Diet and dissolves the House of Representatives, but only does so on the advice of the Cabinet.

== New Zealand ==
The Parliament can be dissolved or prorogued at any time during its three-year term by the governor-general, usually on the advice of the prime minister.

== Norway ==
According to the Constitution of Norway, the Storting (parliament) cannot be dissolved before serving its full four-year term.

== Pakistan ==
The National Assembly of Pakistan, the country's lower house, dissolves automatically at the end of its five-year term, after which general elections must be held within 60 days. The upper house, called the Senate, cannot be dissolved.

The prime minister can also advise the president to dissolve the National Assembly. The president is bound to do so within 48 hours after receiving the prime minister's summary, after which time the National Assembly is automatically dissolved. Before the Eighteenth Amendment to the Constitution of Pakistan came into effect, the president could dissolve the National Assembly without the prime minister's advice by using Article 58-2(B) of the Constitution.

== Peru ==
Under the Peruvian Constitution of 1993, the president of Peru has the authority to dissolve the Congress of Peru if a vote of no confidence is passed three times by the legislative body, and has four months to call for new parliamentary elections or faces impeachment.

The Congress of Peru has been dissolved twice; once in 1992 by President Alberto Fujimori who performed an auto-coup in April 1992 by dismantling both the legislative and judicial branches of government, and once by incumbent President Martín Vizcarra, who dissolved the Congress in October 2019 in an effort to end the 2017–2021 Peruvian political crisis.

Both of the presidents were immediately impeached and removed from office by the dissolved Congress, thus being illegitimate.

On 7 December 2022 the President of Peru attempted to dissolve Congress but was impeached.

== Romania ==
According to the Romanian Constitution, voted in 1991 and revised in 2003, the President may dissolve the Parliament only if the Parliament rejects two consecutive prime minister candidates proposed by the President. Both houses can be dissolved. No dissolution of the Parliament has taken place in Romania since 1991.

== Russia ==
Under Articles 111 and 117 of the Russian Constitution, the president may dissolve the State Duma, the lower house of the Federal Assembly, if it either expresses no confidence in the Government of Russia twice in two months or rejects his proposed candidate for the prime minister three times in a row. At the same time, the president cannot dissolve the Federation Council, the upper house of the Federal Parliament. The power to dissolve the State Duma has not been exercised under the current constitution of 1993. Before the new constitution was enacted, President Boris Yeltsin had dissolved the Congress of People's Deputies and Supreme Soviet of Russia during the Russian constitutional crisis of 1993, although he did not have the formal constitutional powers to do so.

== Spain ==
In Spain, legislatures last four years, after which the king dissolves the Cortes Generales. However, the prime minister, with previous deliberation on the Cabinet, can also dissolve the Cortes. As an exception, if there is no prime minister two months after the first unsuccessful investiture attempt, the king dissolves the Cortes.

== Sri Lanka ==
According to the Constitution, the maximum legislative term of the Parliament of Sri Lanka is 5 years from the first meeting. The President of Sri Lanka may dissolve the Parliament. President shall not dissolve Parliament until the expiration of a period of not less than 2 years and 6 months from the date appointed for its first meeting, unless Parliament by resolution requests the President to dissolve Parliament.

== United Kingdom ==
=== Parliament of the United Kingdom ===
The King may at any time dissolve Parliament. By constitutional convention, this is only done on the advice of the Prime Minister. This prerogative power to dissolve Parliament was removed by the Fixed-term Parliaments Act 2011, but was revived by the Dissolution and Calling of Parliament Act 2022. A Parliament dissolves automatically five years after its first meeting unless dissolved earlier.

=== Northern Ireland Assembly ===
The Assembly can vote to dissolve itself early by a two-thirds majority of the total number of its members. It is also automatically dissolved if it is unable to elect a first minister and deputy first minister (effectively joint first ministers, the only distinction being in the titles) within six weeks of its first meeting or of those positions becoming vacant.

=== Scottish Parliament ===
Under section 2 of the Scotland Act 1998, as originally passed, ordinary general elections for the Scottish Parliament are held on the first Thursday in May every four years (1999, 2003, 2007 etc.) The date of the poll may be varied by up to one month either way by the monarch on the proposal of the presiding officer. However, section 4 of the Fixed-term Parliaments Act 2011 postponed the general election that would have been held on 7 May 2015 to 5 May 2016 to avoid it coinciding with the UK general election fixed under that act. By the Scottish Elections (Dates) Act 2016, the following general election, scheduled for 7 May 2020, was postponed to 6 May 2021 for the same reason, although this became a moot point when a snap UK general election was held in June 2017 (a further UK general election was held in December 2019). Eventually, under the Scottish Elections (Reform) Act 2020, the "normal" term was extended to five years, which was de facto already the practice (2011, 2016, 2021 etc.).

Under section 3 of the Scotland Act 1998, if the parliament itself resolves that it should be dissolved (with at least two-thirds of the members voting in favour), or if the parliament fails to nominate one of its members to be first minister within certain time limits, the presiding officer proposes a date for an extraordinary general election and the parliament is dissolved by the monarch by royal proclamation.

Section 2(3) of the 1998 Act provides that the Parliament is to be dissolved ahead of a general election at the beginning of the "minimum period" which ends with that day. Section 2(4) provides that minimum period is determined in accordance with an order under section 12(1), which provides a power for the Scottish Ministers to make provision about elections. The current provision is contained in article 84 of the Scottish Parliament (Elections etc.) Order 2015 (SSI 2015/425), which sets out that the minimum period is 20 days, computed in accordance with the Scottish Parliamentary Election Rules (which excludes Saturdays, Sundays, Christmas, Easter, Scottish bank holidays and days appointed for public thanksgiving and mourning).

=== National Assembly for Wales ===
Under the Wales Act 2014, ordinary general elections to the Senedd (Welsh Parliament) are held the first Thursday in May every five years. This extension from a four- to five-year term was designed to prevent Senedd elections clashing with general elections to the Westminster Parliament subsequent to the Fixed-term Parliaments Act 2011.

== United States ==
In 1774 after the Boston Tea Party, the Massachusetts Bay Province's legislature was dismissed under the Massachusetts Government Act and the colony was placed under martial law under the command of General Thomas Gage. In practice, the majority of the colony came under the de facto control of the unrecognized Massachusetts Provincial Congress, and General Gage's attempts to suppress widespread dissent among the colonists directly lead to the Battles of Lexington and Concord and the beginning of the Revolutionary War.

The United States Constitution does not allow for the dissolution of Congress, instead allowing for prorogation by the President of the United States when Congress is unable to agree on a time of adjournment. The delegates to the Constitutional Convention of 1787 agreed on the need to limit presidential authority to prevent a return to autocracy. In Federalist No. 69, Alexander Hamilton stressed that unlike the King of Great Britain, the President does not have the authority to dismiss Congress at his preference. To date, the presidential authority to prorogue Congress has never been used, although in 2020 President Donald Trump threatened to use it in order to make recess appointments.

== Venezuela ==
The Bolivarian Constitution of Venezuela authorizes, through various articles, the president to dissolve the National Assembly.

Article 236 of the Constitution establishes which are the functions to be performed by the first national president; Paragraph 23 of this section states that one of the powers of the president is: "Dissolve the National Assembly in accordance with the provisions of this Constitution."

In statement 240 explains that will dissolve the Parliament when in a same constitutional period the Assembly approve the removal of the vice president of the country by means of censure, three times.

It is also clarified that the decree of dissolution of the Venezuelan congress entails the call for elections for a new legislature, which must be held in the next 60 days. In addition, this section indicates that the Parliament can not be dissolved during the last year of its constitutional period.

In the 2017 Venezuelan constitutional crisis, the Supreme Tribunal of Justice dissolved the National Assembly and assumed its legislative powers. The decision was viewed by the Venezuelan opposition and many members of the international community, including the United States, Mercosur, and the Organization of American States, as a self-coup by President Nicolás Maduro. After several days, the decision was reversed on the advice of President Maduro.

== In fiction ==
- In the 1977 science fiction film Star Wars the Emperor dissolves the Senate of the Galactic Empire, itself rendered a rubber stamp after his seizure of power in the former Galactic Republic, after the beginning of the Galactic Civil War and growing sympathy for the Rebel Alliance in the Senate. Each of the planets in the Empire are left under the control of regional governors, with fear of the newly created Death Star to prevent dissent and ensure the planets' continued allegiance to the Empire.
- The 2014 play King Charles III and the 2017 television adaptation of the same name center around Charles III withholding royal assent to a parliamentary bill restricting freedom of the press after becoming King and then dissolving the British Parliament after it attempts to abolish the royal assent, leading to a constitutional crisis which forces Charles to abdicate in favor of his son Prince William.

== See also ==
- Snap election
