= History of the Constitution of Brazil =

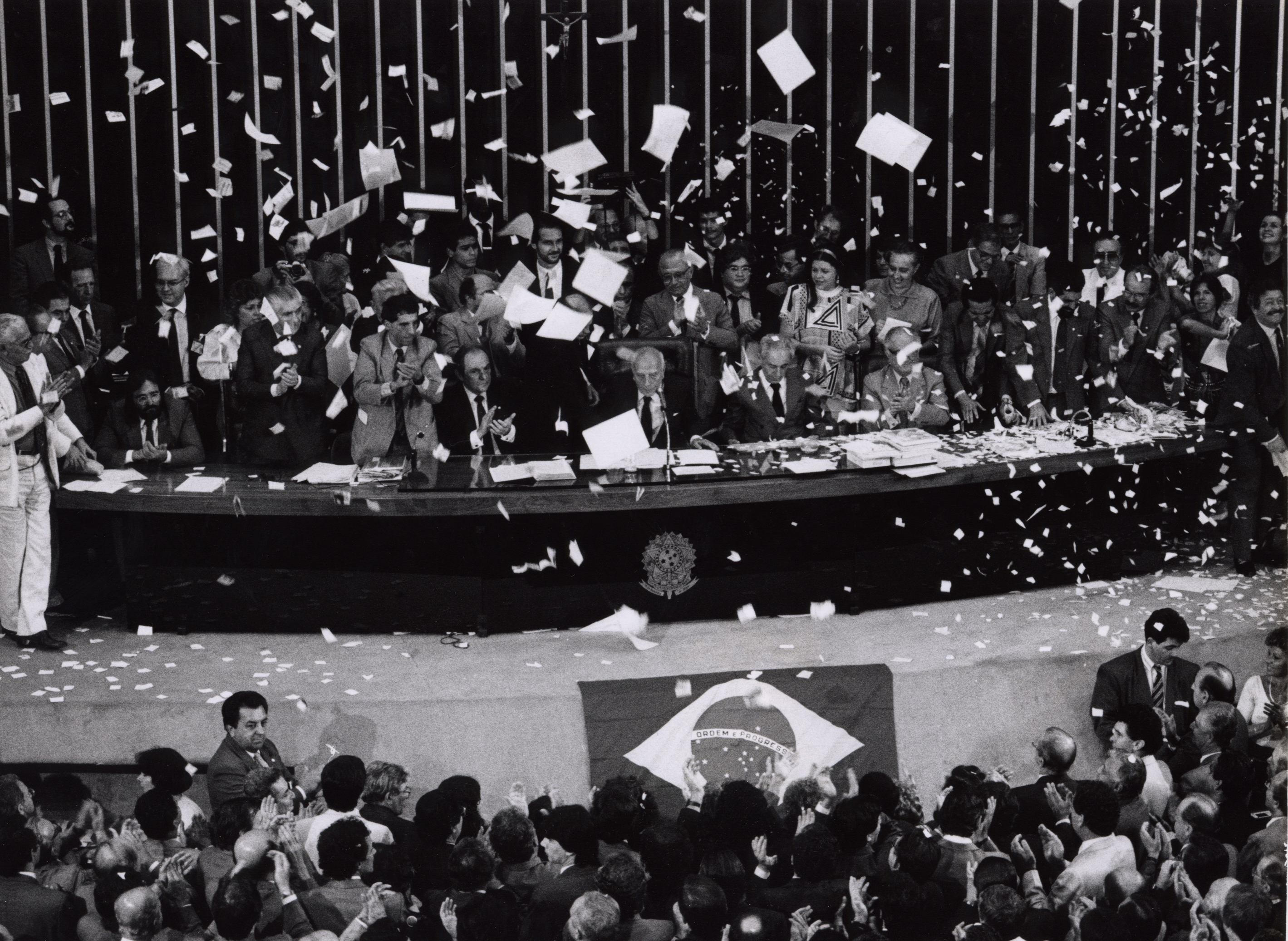
Closing of the voting on Brazil's 1988 Constitution, the first constitution after the military dictatorship, with a speech by deputy Ulysses Guimarães, the president of the Constituent Assembly

During its independent political history, Brazil has had seven constitutions. The most recent was ratified on October 5, 1988.

== Imperial Constitution (1824) ==
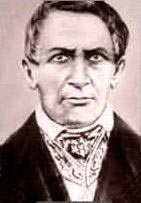
The Marquis of Sabará was among the noblemen charged with drafting Brazil's first Constitution.

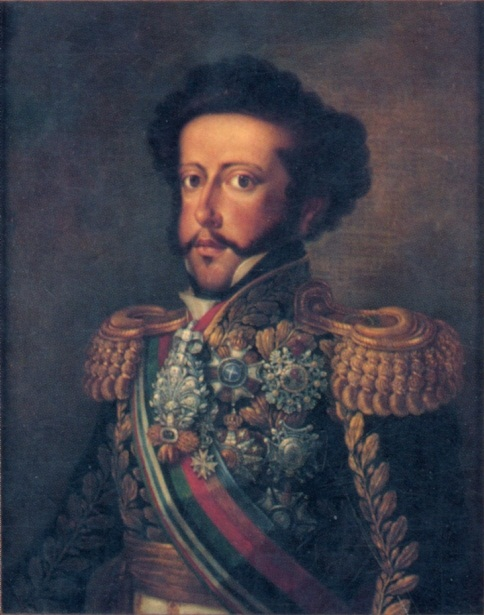
Pedro I, Emperor of Brazil.

=== Background ===
Prior to its independence on September 7, 1822, Brazil had no formal Constitution, since Portugal only adopted its first Constitution on September 23, 1822, 16 days after Brazil proclaimed independence. In 1823, Emperor Pedro I started the political process of writing a Constitution.

Drafting of the first Constitution of Brazil was quite difficult and the power struggle involved resulted in a long-lasting unrest that plagued the country for nearly two decades. Two major facts increased the troubles:

- Large numbers of recent immigrants from Portugal (the so-called "Portuguese Party"), who wanted to keep their privileges or who were still loyal to the metropolitan government. These were found both among the wealthier parts of the population, as businessmen controlling Brazil's international trade, and the lower ones, as tradesmen and free urban workers (the Brazilian elite was mostly rural).
- The majority of the population was composed of slaves, prompting the whites to fear being massacred in the event of a rebellion caused by a failing state.

The first circumstance meant that despite strong support of the Crown Prince Pedro I by the Brazilian landowners (the so-called "Brazilian Party"), the opinions of the reinóis (name then given to recent immigrants from Portugal) should be considered. As each side had very distinct and different objectives none could prevail and a compromise was needed.

There were also additional problems: the Constitutional Assembly had been elected to decide the applicability of Portuguese laws in Brazil, not to draft a new constitution. As a result, some of the Portuguese deputies refused to take part in it. On the other hand, the liberal Brazilian deputies had been persecuted: some were exiled while others were imprisoned. Thus the Constitutional Assembly did not hear an appreciable number of opinions and would reflect the objectives of the "Brazilian Party", to the detriment of the "Portuguese Party" and the liberals.

As the draft constitution progressed it became clear that the deputies were trying to establish a constitution that would:

- curtail the powers of the monarch,
- restrict most political rights to landowners and deny them to the Portuguese, and
- establish an authoritarian, but constitutional, monarchy, whose head of government would be the Emperor himself, aided by a group of ministers of his choice.

The Emperor did not want to serve as a mere decorative figurehead, but rather to protect the interests of the Portuguese businessmen (who were the main economic base of Brazil) and prevent any further cession of his power to the Parliament.

In light of the wave of conservatism led by the Holy Alliance, the Emperor used his influence over the Brazilian Army to dissolve the Constitutional Assembly, in what became known as the Night of Agony. On his own authority, he then issued a constitution that concentrated the executive power on the Emperor himself (eventually crowned "Constitutional Emperor and Perpetual Defender of Brazil").

Based on the French Constitution of 1791 and the Spanish Constitution of 1812, the Constitution endowed the Assembly with both status and authority. It created executive, legislative, judicial, and moderating branches as "delegations of the nation" with the separation of those powers envisaged as providing balances in support of the Constitution and the rights it enshrined.

The Constitution of 1824 was rather less parliamentary than the draft prepared by the Constituent Assembly. In fact, it was for all purposes a peculiar and unique regime: a "presidential" monarchy. That did not mean, by any means, that the Brazilian monarch had prerogatives resembling those of a tyrant or dictator. The individual guarantees of human liberty and dignity were inserted into the articles of the Charter and were respected. The Emperor would not act in areas reserved to the legislative branch and the judiciary, such as to create laws or to judge and sentence.

Even though it vested the Emperor with more power than its would-be predecessor, the Imperial Constitution was considered very progressive for its time. It was considered more progressive than several constitutions used by European liberal powers.

=== The Constitution ===
The new constitution, published on March 25, 1824 outlined the existence of four powers:

- Executive — The State Council
- Legislative — The General Assembly, formed by the Senate and the Chamber of Deputies
- Judiciary — The Courts
- Moderator — Vested in the Emperor, was supposed to resolve any incompatibilities between the other three, acting as a "neutral" power, in accordance to the theories of the French-Swiss thinker Benjamin Constant.

The Emperor controlled the Executive by nominating the members of the State Council, influenced the Legislative by being allowed to propose motions and having the power to dissolve the Chamber of Deputies (senators sat for life, however, being individually chosen by the emperor among the top three candidates in a given province) and also influenced the Judiciary, by appointing (for life) the members of the Highest Court.

This constitution established the Empire of Brazil as a unitary state (the provinces had little autonomy, if any). The Amendment (Ato Adicional) of August 12, 1834, enacted in a period of liberal reform, authorized the provinces to create their own legislative chambers, which were empowered to legislate on financial matters, create taxes and their own corps of civil servants under a chief executive nominated by the central power; it was however revised by an "interpretive" act of May 1840, enacted in a period of conservative reaction, which allowed the central power to appoint judges and police officers in the provinces.

On July 20, 1847, a Decree (number 523) established the post of Prime Minister, formally titled "president of the Council of Ministers" (not to be confused with the State Council, whose ten members sat for life and which in the late Empire functioned solely as an advising body to the Emperor). Appointed by the Emperor, the Prime Minister then chose a cabinet of state secretaries, or ministers. The cabinet had to maintain the support of a majority in the General Assembly. The Emperor's acts were not valid without the countersignature of the minister responsible for the issue concerned. The 1847 decree thus turned the Empire into a standard constitutional monarchy with a parliamentary system.

The franchise was very limited, being censitary and indirect: no male citizen who was not head of a household and/or had a net yearly income of less than a hundred milréis was allowed to vote in the primary elections that chose actual electors, empowered with the right to vote for the Chamber of Deputies and the Senate. As a result, Brazilian legislatures had a decided conservative slant. Combined with widespread electoral frauds, no Prime Minister chosen by the Emperor – who had the power to order the dissolution of the Chamber of Deputies and new elections to it – ever failed to win a parliamentary majority in subsequent elections.

The Constitution of 1824, enacted in the name of the Holy Trinity, also instituted Catholicism as the state religion, allowing other religions to be practiced only in private: non-Catholic places of worship could not be fashioned to appear as religious buildings from the outside. It also excluded slaves from Brazilian citizenship, by extending it to all people born in Brazil who were freeborn or freed.

== Old Republic Constitution (1891) ==
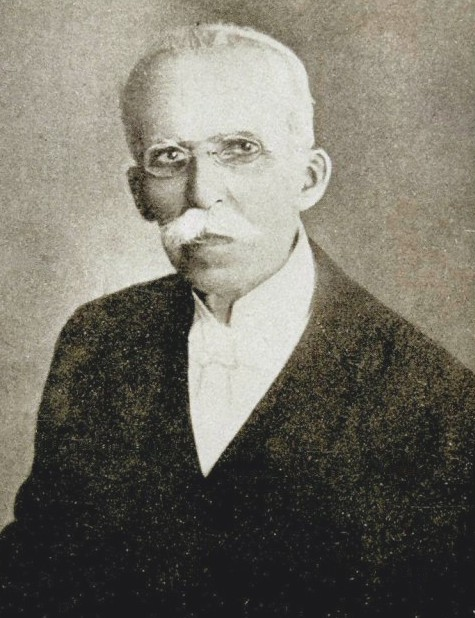
Rui Barbosa had a large influence upon the text adopted as the 1891 Constitution of Brazil.

=== Background ===
On November 15, 1889, the Emperor Pedro II was deposed, the Brazilian monarchy abolished and the 1824 Constitution was put out of effect. No provisional constitution was used while a definitive successor document was being written. The writing process began in 1889, by a group of jurists and politicians, and the text was later amended by a Constitutional Congress on February 24, 1891.

=== The Constitution ===
In its final form, the new Constitution meant to create a federal state to promote individual liberties above all, following the basic principles of the Constitution of the United States, albeit with the adoption of a slightly different (and somewhat more centralized) form of federalism.

The main traits of the Constitution were:

- Federalism: the provinces were turned into states whose indissoluble union was taken as forming the Body Politic of the Brazilian Federation. Governors (at the time called State Presidents) were to be elected by direct vote and a fixed term of office.
- Separation of the State and Church.
- Male universal suffrage (with exceptions, mostly illiterates, beggars and members of monastic orders) and basic individual rights for all citizens. Abolition of the death penalty.
- Adoption of standard three-way separation of powers under a presidential republic on the American model; direct elections for all members of the Legislative and chief officers of the Executive branch. The Executive branch was headed by a President of the Republic, elected by direct voting (rather than an Electoral college in the American model) – who had a four-year term and could not be reelected for a second, successive, term – and his freely chosen cabinet of ministers. The Senate was reorganized as the Upper House of the Legislative branch, formed of representatives of the states (as opposed to the representatives of the people in the Chamber of Deputies) directly elected and with fixed terms of office.

== Third Constitution (1934) ==
=== Background ===
In 1930, after severe political problems, President Washington Luís was overthrown by a coup d'état. The 1891 Constitution was annulled and the Provisional President Getúlio Vargas ruled as a de facto personal dictator, but the state landed elites (who had controlled the Brazilian state ever since independence) struggled to prevent this from continuing. In 1932, in São Paulo, the Constitutionalist Revolution demanded a Constitution. As a result, a Constitutional Assembly was elected and the constitution was promulgated on July 16, 1934, less than four years after the coup d'état had overthrown the Old Republic. Vargas accepted this constitution in order to legitimise his power.

=== The Constitution ===
This Constitution was the shortest-lived Constitution of Brazil, lasting only three years (until 1937).

Despite its short life, this constitution was important because it was the first time a Brazilian constitution was written from scratch by directly elected deputies in multi-party elections. As a consequence of this, it incorporated a number of improvements to Brazilian political, social and economical life:

- Granted complete independence to the Supreme Court and subordinated all other courts to it.
- Extended political rights to all adults, regardless of sex.
- Introduced proportional voting for elections to the Chamber of Deputies, which included representatives of the people as well as a minority of representatives from trade unions and other professional organizations – a corporatist device introduced under the shock of the Russian Revolution and the influence of Italian fascism.
- Created a specific electoral court to supervise elections, under the control of the Supreme Court (previously the supervision of elections was under control of the Legislative Branch).
- Following a trend set by the German Weimar Constitution, acknowledged a whole host of social rights alongside political and civil ones: the national minimum wage, the eight-hour workday, mandatory weekly rest, paid vacations and indemnity for unmotivated firing.
- Created a labor court to supervise working conditions and codified rights and duties for both the employers and the employees.
- Was the first Brazilian constitution to list all four basic freedoms (speech, religion, movement and assembly) alongside the basic rights (life, freedom and property).

== "Estado Novo" Constitution (1937) ==
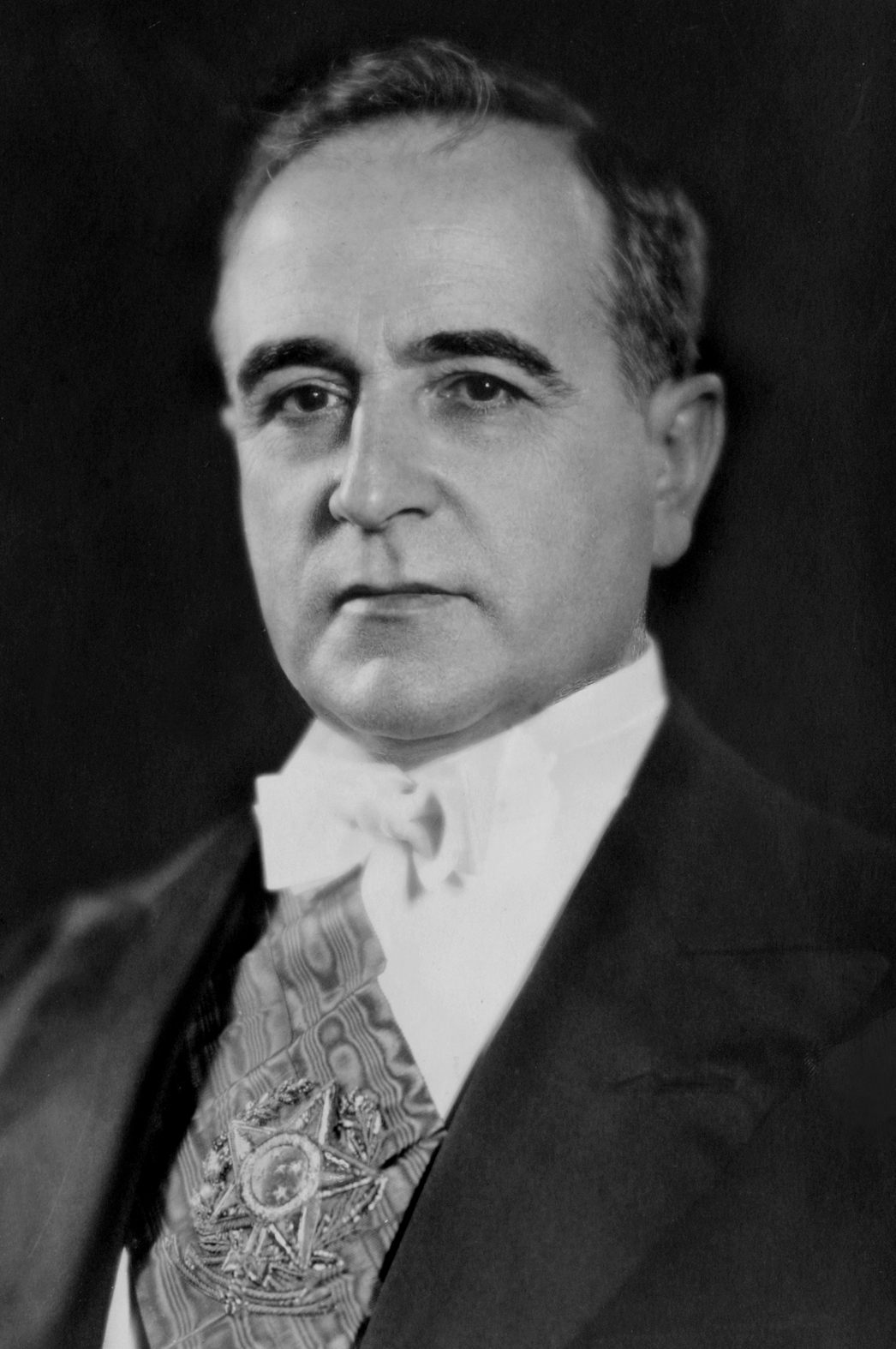
The adoption of the 1937 Brazilian Constitution marked the beginning of Getúlio Vargas's dictatorship.

=== Background ===
On the night of November 10, 1937, Vargas announced in a nationwide radio address that he was seizing emergency powers under the pretext of suppressing a Communist-backed coup (the so-called Cohen Plan). On the same night, he promulgated a new constitution that effectively transformed his presidency into a legal dictatorship (the short interval suggesting that the self-coup had been planned well in advance). It was written by the minister of Justice, Francisco Campos, and proofread by Vargas and his minister of War (joint-commander of the Army and Air Force), Eurico Gaspar Dutra.

=== The Constitution ===
The new document was called the "Polaca", or Polish, Constitution because it was inspired by the Polish April Constitution of 1935. It was intended to consolidate the powers of the president, while substantially limiting the powers and autonomy of Congress and the judiciary. While clearly dictatorial, it was not intended to be completely totalitarian and repressive. It kept most social improvements of the previous constitution, and added more: The right to education, the right to culture preservation and guidelines for family rights, building on the Civil Code of 1917.

On the other side, however, it heavily concentrated executive power:

- Political parties were dissolved.
- State "presidents" (elected) would be replaced by interventionists (appointed by the president of the republic).
- Mayors would in turn be appointed by the interventionists.
- Capital punishment was to be enforced on "traitors to the state" (a fairly broad category).
- All requirements for an outright dictatorship (censorship, purges, militarism, state propaganda, cult of personality and others) were either required, allowed or not forbidden by the constitution.

== Fifth Constitution (1946) ==
Gustavo Capanema was a member of the 1946 Constitutional Congress.

=== Background ===
When Vargas was forced to resign in 1945, a new constitution was written, once again by a directly elected Constitutional Congress.

=== The Constitution ===
This was the first Brazilian constitution to provide full political freedom (even the Brazilian Communist Party was made legal, though briefly) and the last to officially name the country Estados Unidos do Brazil (and the spelling of the country's name would change later that year). It was also the first with an additional "Act of Transitory Measures" (a set of laws that came into effect before the constitution itself and could not be changed).

The key points of this Constitution were:

- Restore all rights and freedoms as expressed by the 1934 Constitution which had been suppressed in 1937.
- Reducing the powers of the presidency. While it remained the key institution, numerous institutional safeguards were put in place to prevent a repeat of Vargas's authoritarian excesses.
- Establish full equality before the law.
- Created mechanisms to prevent and oppose religious prejudice and censorship (the latter with some exceptions regarding moral censorship of spectacles and public shows).
- Mentioned the right to postal privacy and the inviolability of homes (until then police could enter anyone's house without a permit).
- Improved federalism by extending the powers of the member states (for instance, it was the first time states were allowed to have flags and anthems).
- Although it was not the first time all adults were granted full political rights, it was under this constitution that the first free and fair elections were held at all levels and for all offices.
- Elections for executive offices would be held in a single round.
- Voters could freely choose candidates of any party, including for vice president and vice governor.

The last two would become the major problems of this constitution, as they were prone to produce and fuel both legitimacy crises (as the presidents were usually elected by less than a majority of votes) and conspiracies (as the vice-president was usually from another party).

== Sixth Constitution (1967) ==
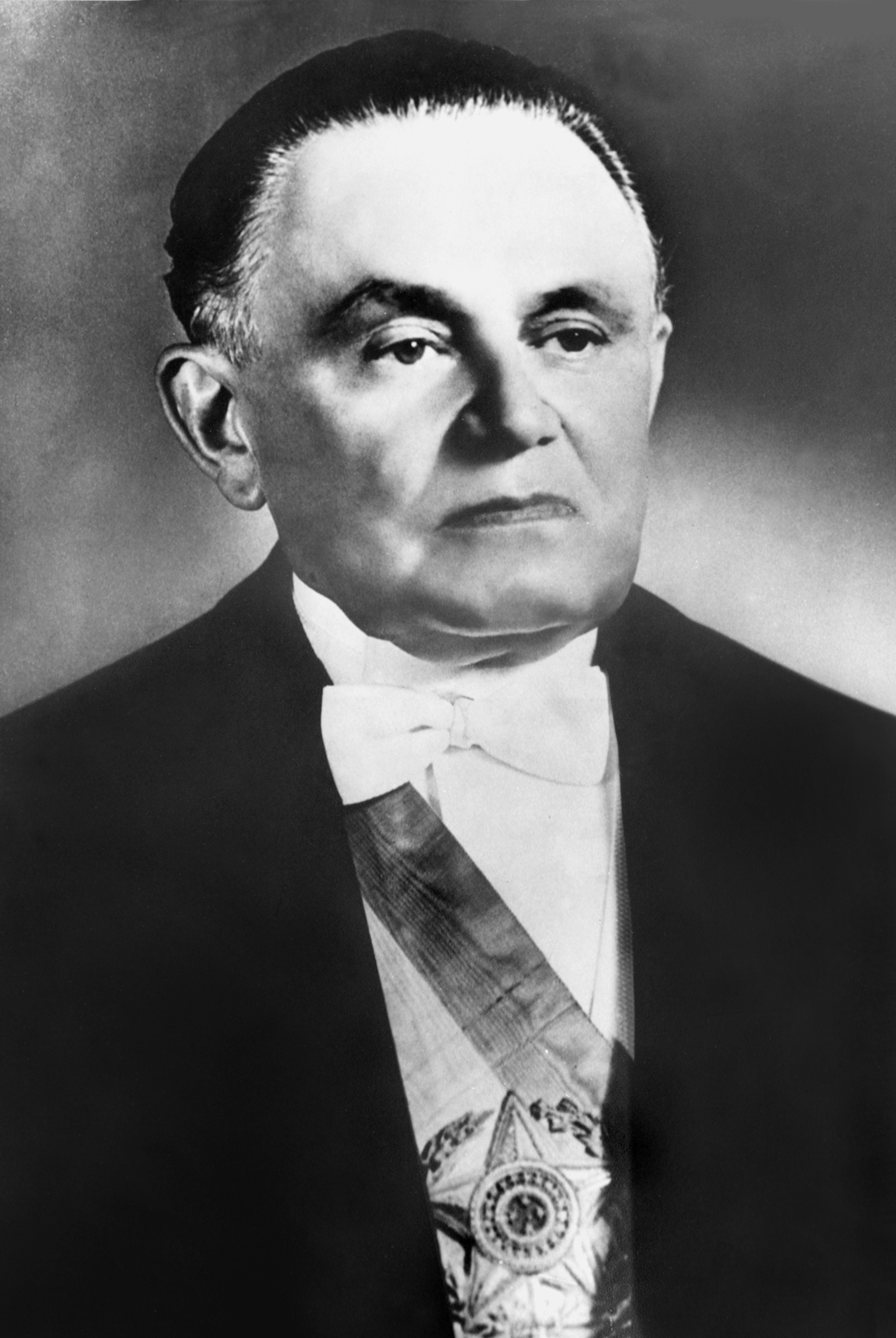
President of Brazil FM Humberto Castelo Branco.

=== Background ===
After the military coup d'état of April 1, 1964 the controllers of the new regime kept the 1946 Constitution and promised to restore democracy as soon as possible. However, they did not and were faced with a dilemma, as every major measure they took was strictly against that current Constitution, including the coup itself.

The so-called Institutional Acts sequentially issued by the military presidents were, in practice, placed higher than the Constitution and could amend it. Even under these circumstances, the first military president, Humberto de Alencar Castelo Branco, was committed to restoring civilian rule in 1966. However, a large number of military and civilian extremists felt the military had to stay in power for some years. They also wanted to pass more "proper" laws to fight subversive individuals (anyone that opposed the regime).

By 1965, however, the situation reached an unbearable point when opposition candidates won the governorship of Minas Gerais and Guanabara. Castelo Branco refused to annul the results. A coup was only averted when Castelo Branco agreed to support the military's reform program. By this time, the military had decided to drop all pretense of democracy. It also felt the 1946 Constitution was "obsolete" as the "new institutions" were not foreseen in it.

A new Constitution was written by a team of lawyers commissioned by Castelo Branco and amended (under the instructions of Castelo Branco himself) by the Minister of Justice, Carlos Medeiros Silva and voted on as a whole by the Brazilian Parliament (already purged of most opponents of the status quo).

=== The Original Constitution ===
The main features of the new Constitution were:

- Restriction of political rights: direct elections would only be held at state and county level, but not in federal territories or cities considered of interest to national security for any reason (such cities were specified as those near the international border, state capitals, important industrial centers, university towns, jungle towns, towns close to power plants, mining sites, etc). About 500 cities/towns were listed--in practice, the largest and most important ones. Presidents and governors were chosen in indirect elections by the correspondent Legislative branch (the National Congress and State Legislatures). However, these "elections" were elaborate shams. In practice, the president was selected by the military command, while governors were hand-picked by the president and his advisers. The federal and state legislatures were dominated by government supporters, meaning the government candidate could not possibly be defeated.
- Restriction of civil rights: any meeting, assembly, or gathering of people should be formal, must be previously authorized, and conducted under supervision. Unauthorized meetings would be disbanded by the police and participants sued if lucky; they were more likely imprisoned, tortured, or worse.
- Military (uniformed) State Police Corps acknowledged as reserve corps of the Federal Army (as well as State Fire Brigades), with the task of outdoor patrolling to "provide public security", thereby reducing the autonomy of the existing civilian (plainclothes) police to an investigative role.
- Removal of all privileges of judges, allowing the president to force them to retire or to remove them (the latter was never used).
- After previously disbanding of all political parties (which had existed for only twenty years), new rules were written on the formation of parties. These rules were so restrictive that only two parties were formed—the government party, the National Renewal Alliance Party (Arena), and the controlled opposition of the Brazilian Democratic Movement (MDB).
- Limitation of states' autonomy.
- Establishment of a series of controls, commissions, and institutions to regulate and report a number of aspects of civil, social, and economic life, thus intensifying an already existing trend towards bureaucracy, top-heavy management of the economy by the central government.
- Granting the president the right to issue decrees (Decretos-Lei) that would enter in force at the moment of their publication and be inscribed in the statute-book after 30 days in the absence of Congressional deliberation on them.

=== Amendments of 1969 ===
In 1969, this already severely authoritarian document was widely amended by a provisional military junta and made even more repressive. The 1969 Amendment is sometimes regarded as a seventh Constitution, because it almost completely rewrote the text of the 1967 document.

The new constitutional text brought some extra tools for the regime:

- Giving the president the right to declare a state of emergency and suspend constitutional freedoms.
- Broadened capital punishment.
- Banishment – with loss of citizenship – as punishment.
- Suspension of habeas corpus.
- Special military courts to try members of the military accused of crimes.
- Transfer of command of the military police from each federal state to the Ministry of the Army.
- Restrictions on travel.

From 1979 onward, however, the constitution was gradually purged of its authoritarian character. This process accelerated with the return of civilian rule in 1985, culminating in the adoption of a new constitution in 1988.

== Citizen Constitution (1988–present) ==
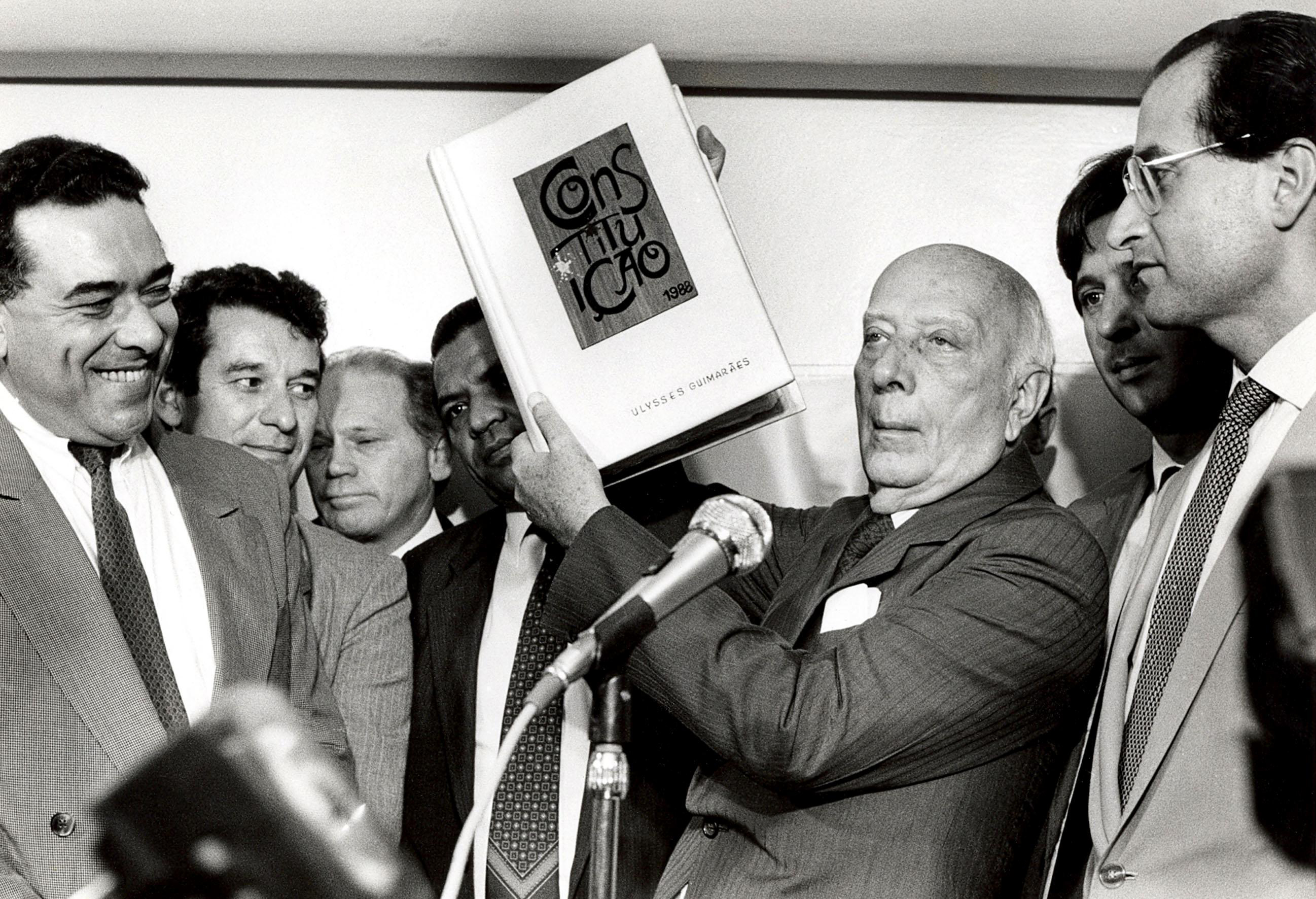
President of the Constitutional Congress Ulysses Guimarães holds a copy of the 1988 Constitution.

=== Background ===
The seventh and current Brazilian Constitution was promulgated on October 5, 1988 after a two-year process in which it was written from scratch by a Constitutional Congress elected in 1986.

=== The Constitution ===
It appears as a reaction to the period of military dictatorship, seeking to guarantee all manner of rights and restricting the state's ability to limit freedom, to punish offenses and to regulate individual life. On the other hand, it did not provide clear rules for state reform and kept the economic regulation of the country intact.

Among the new constitutional guarantees are the errand of injunction and the habeas data (one's right to have access to any data about him kept by the Government). It also anticipated the existence of a Consumers' Defence Code (which was brought out in 1990), of Children's and Youth Code (1990) and of a new Civil Code (2002).

It was the first constitution to demand severe punishment for breaches of civil liberties and rights. Consequently, Brazil later approved a law making the propagation of prejudice against any minority or ethnic group an unbailable crime. This law provided legal redress against those who spread hate speech (like Neo-Nazis) or those who do not treat all citizens equally. This second aspect helped disabled people to have a reserved percentage of jobs in the public service (and soon in all large companies), and black people to seek reparation for prejudice in the courts.

Breaking with the authoritarian logic of the Constitution of 1967, it made unbailable crimes those of torture and of actions directed against the democratic state and the constitutional order, thus creating constitutional devices to block coups d'état of any kind.

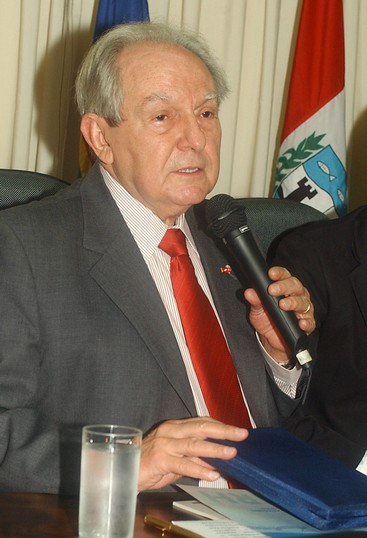
Constitutional Congressman Bernardo Cabral wrote the final draft of the Constitution.

Willing to create a truly democratic state, the Constitution has established many forms of direct popular participation besides regular voting, such as plebiscite, referendum and the possibility of ordinary citizens proposing new laws. Examples of these democratic mechanisms were the 1993 plebiscite concerning the form of government, where the Presidential system was confirmed, and the 2005 referendum concerning the prohibition of the sale of firearms and ammunition.

The mention of God in the preamble of the Constitution (and later on the Brazilian currency (now the Brazilian real) was opposed by most leftists as incompatible with freedom of religion because it does not recognize the rights of polytheists (like the Amerindians) or atheists, but it has not been removed so far. The only State Constitution that does not refer to God is the one of Acre. The Supreme Federal Court has ruled that this omission of the protection of God was not unconstitutional since the preamble of the constitution is simply an indication of principles that serves as an introduction to the constitutional text and reflects the ideological conceptions of the legislator, falling within the scope of political ideology and not of the law. Therefore, the preamble which is not actually a part of the supreme law, has no judicial validity whatsoever and cannot impose obligations or create rights.

=== Amendments ===
Despite its advances concerning individual rights and freedoms and also in government control, the Constitutional text brought dispositions that resulted in severe difficulties concerning governmental efficiency. In the following years, especially from 1995 onwards, this meant it had to be amended many times to get rid of impractical, contradictory or unclear provisions (but also to accommodate the economic reforms conducted by the government, for which such amendments have been sometimes criticized.) As of August 2020, this Constitution has been amended 108 times.
