= Reverse parliamentarism =

Brazilian Empire political system, 1840–1889

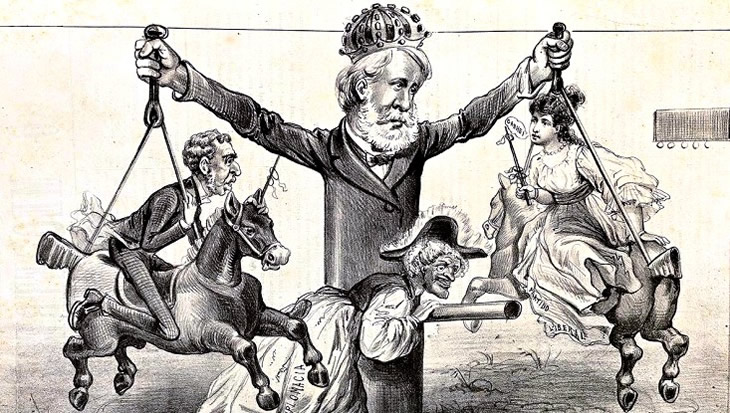
Cartoon depicting the alternation of parties in the Empire during the Second Reign, in which the main parties appear on a merry-go-round formed by Pedro II.

Reverse parliamentarism (Portuguese: Parlamentarismo às avessas) was the political system in force in the Brazilian Empire during the Second Reign. This system consisted of the Conservative and Liberal parties alternating at the head of the executive branch, based on the choice of the Moderator.

In 1847, Decree No. 523 created the position of President of the Council of Ministers (Prime minister), who became head of the Executive Branch and organized the government cabinet. Thus, the Emperor no longer appointed all the ministers, but only the President of the council, who, in turn, chose the other members of his ministry, in agreement with parliament, removing an element of political wear and tear from the monarch, without diminishing his authority, in a system mirrored in British parliamentarism.

== British and Brazilian parliaments ==
The hierarchy of classical parliamentarism and Brazilian parliamentarism was inverted, hence the name "reverse parliamentarism".

In the UK, the Crown, based on the majority of parliament and who they advise, chooses the prime minister. Parliament then approves or disapproves this decision. This person will be the country's head of government, running and managing the UK. Although appointed by the monarch, taking into account the composition of the legislature, the prime minister must account for his actions only to parliament, which, if it deems it necessary, can remove him from office.

In Brazilian parliamentarianism, the monarch waited for the legislative elections and chose the President of the council from the party with the majority in parliament. However, according to the 1824 Constitution, he was not obliged to do this and could choose any politician, from any party, for the post. Therefore, as a rule, the head of government's name was chosen or nominated before the elections, and it was up to him to organize the ballot. As the electoral system was largely based on fraud and the influence of local political bosses, the party in power usually achieved a majority in the Chamber, confirming the Emperor's choice and maintaining the fictitious alternation of power.

== Bibliography ==
- Carvalho, José Murilo de (1996). A construção da ordem : a elite política imperial; Teatro de sombras : a política imperial (in Brazilian Portuguese). Rio de Janeiro: UFRJ Press. ISBN 857108145X. OCLC 40360384.
- Carvalho, José Murilo de; Gaspari, Elio; Schwarcz, Lilia Moritz (2007). D. Pedro II (in Brazilian Portuguese). São Paulo: Companhia das Letras. ISBN 978-8535909692. OCLC 143911201.
