= Redemocratization in Brazil =

Period of liberalization during the Brazilian military regime (1974–1988)

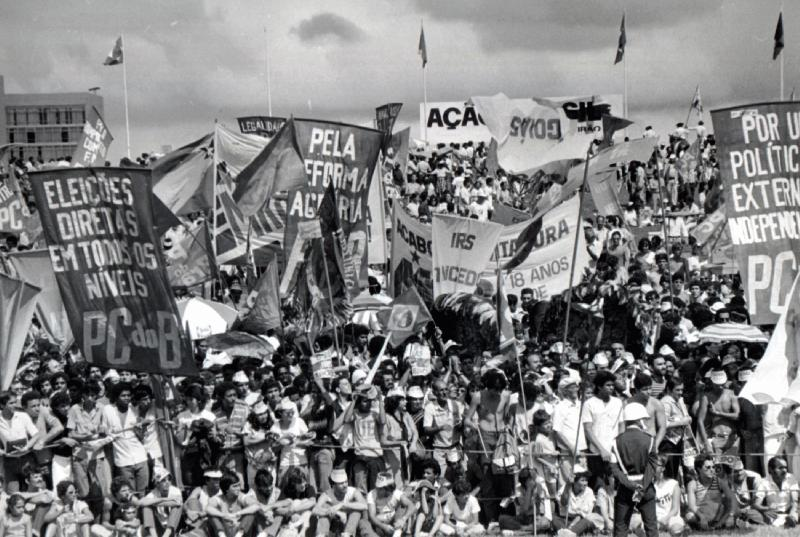
Diretas Já demonstration in Brasília for open elections

The redemocratization of Brazil (Portuguese: abertura política, lit. 'political opening') was the 1974–1988 period of liberalization under the country's military dictatorship, ending with the decline of the regime, the signing of the country's new constitution, and the transition to democracy. Then-president Ernesto Geisel began the process of liberalization (nicknamed Portuguese: distensão) in 1974, by allowing for the Brazilian Democratic Movement opposition party's participation in congressional elections. He worked to address human rights violations and began to undo the military dictatorship's founding legislation, the Institutional Acts, in 1978. General João Figueiredo, elected the next year, continued the transition to democracy, freeing the last political prisoners in 1980 and instituting direct elections in 1982. The 1985 election of a ruling opposition party marked the military dictatorship's end. The process of liberalization ultimately was successful, culminating with the promulgation of the 1988 Brazilian Constitution.

The democratization's historiography shows disagreement as to whether the opening was spurred more by divisions among the country's elite or by pressure from civil society, including church grassroots, new unionism, and opposition voters.

== Process of Democratization ==
Though Geisel started to make democratic changes during his term, authoritarian practices such as suppressing opposition through torture and imprisonment were maintained under his leadership, which fueled the political opposition. Some Brazilians turned to popular protest. A wide range of social movements emerged, including Christian and Catholic anti-military organizations, a small feminist movement, militant African-Brazilian groups, and most significantly, a labor movement. The late 1970s saw a rise in militant trade unionists across important industries in Brazil. After a series of large strikes, the Workers’ Party was created with Luiz Inácio Lula Da Silva as its leader.

Figueiredo assumed the presidency with an interest in turning Brazil to civilian rule. In 1982, direct elections were established for governors, but direct elections for the presidency were not put into place until 1989, despite large protests.

Tancredo Neves, member of the Party of the Brazilian Democratic Movement (PMDB), was elected president in 1985, but died before inauguration, and the presidency was assumed by vice president-elect Jose Sarney. Sarney would introduce bills that aimed to improve the economy and support the working class, but with little success. The 1988 Brazilian Constitution would be put into effect under his presidency.

== Economy ==
Despite systemic changes, the Brazilian economy struggled to combat rapid inflation throughout democratization. In the years leading up to democratization, Brazil faced a trade deficit when industry was export-based with no increase in domestic consumption. Imports contributed to the national debt. The majority of income was represented by a small group of people, resulting in growing class inequality. The oil crisis of 1973 increased unemployment and lowered the quality of life in Brazil. Agriculture industry expanded into the Amazon rainforest, which threatened both the environment and the indigenous groups that reside there. A rescue loan agreement was signed in 1983 to alleviate Brazil’s $89 billion debt, resulting in the removal of subsidies on gas and some foods and limited government spending. In 1985, inflation would reach 230%. Two austerity programs would be put into place: the Cruzado Plan, introduced in 1986, which unsuccessfully attempted to stop inflation, and the Cruzado Plan II, introduced later that year, which was similarly ineffective. The programs were met with opposition from labor unions. In 1987, a program was developed to help preserve the Amazon from industrialization. Inflation would continue after the implementation of the new constitution.

== Constitution ==
The 1988 Brazilian Constitution went into effect on 5 October 1988. It replaced the authoritarian system with democratic institutions, opened voting to illiterates, recognized Indigenous rights, and rewrote the labor code.

Though progressive, the constitution was limited in its check on power. Brazil's lower classes still faced human rights violations and the economy continued to be affected by inflation. The population of Brazil, though increasingly educated, was stifled by a suffering economy, sparking violent crimes in response. Liberalization also brought change to political campaigns and the electoral process. Political parties were composed similarly to those of the 1960s and sought to represent the producing classes. Additionally, campaign spending tended to be high.

== See also ==
- History of Brazil (1985–present)

== Bibliography ==
- Hagopian, Frances (2007). "The Traditional Political Elite and the Transition to Democracy". Traditional Politics and Regime Change in Brazil. Cambridge University Press. ISBN 978-0-521-03288-9.
- Orme, John (1988). "Dismounting the Tiger: Lessons from Four Liberalizations". Political Science Quarterly. 103 (2): 245–265. doi:10.2307/2151183. ISSN 0032-3195. JSTOR 2151183.
