= Night of Agony =

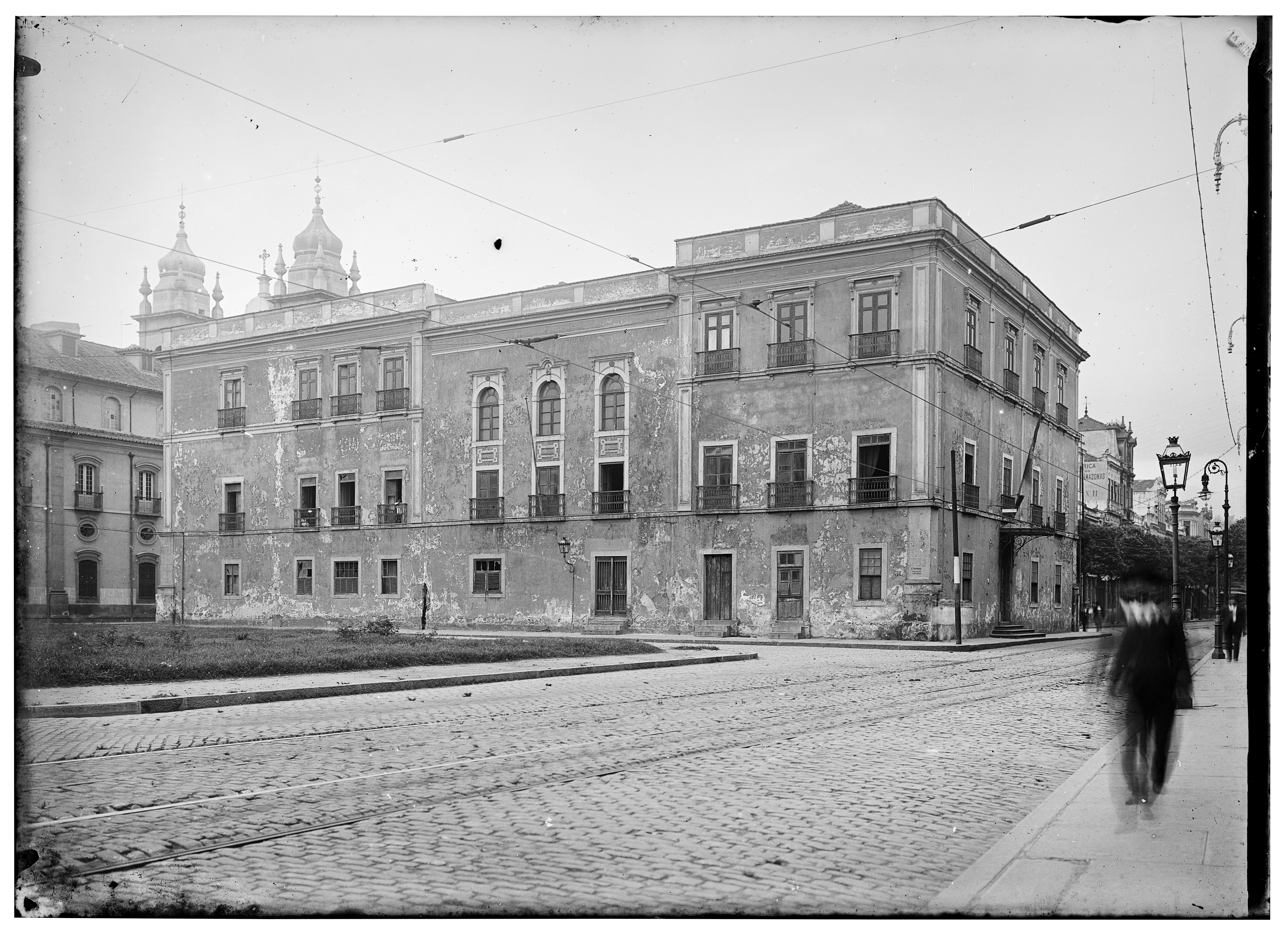
The old Town Hall and Jail (Cadeia Velha), now the Tiradentes Palace, where the Brazilian Constituent Assembly of 1823 and a night of agony took place. It is also the first headquarters of the Chamber of Deputies.

The Night of Agony (Portuguese: Noite da Agonia) was a historical event in the Brazilian Empire, occurring in the pre-dawn hours of 12 November 1823, when emperor Dom Pedro I ordered the army to invade and dissolve the Brazilian Constituent Assembly. The assembly resisted for several hours, but in the end was dissolved and a few of its members were imprisoned and deported, including the brothers José Bonifácio de Andrada e Silva, Martim Francisco Ribeiro de Andrada and Antônio Carlos Ribeiro de Andrada.

The following year, on 25 March 1824, a new Imperial Constitution was adopted, which designed an Executive, Legislative, and Judicial powers, but also a moderating power, which invested in the Emperor the title of "Moderator", acting as a neutral intermediary between the branches.
