= 1834 Additional Act =

Amendment to the Brazilian Constitution

The Additional Act was an amendment to the Brazilian Constitution of 1824, passed on August 12, 1834. The amendment enhanced the autonomy of the provinces.
