= Brazilian Constituent Assembly (1823) =

Document of November 16, 1823, in which Emperor Pedro I justifies and presents the reasons for the dissolution of the Constituent Assembly (IN: Coleção de Leis do Império do Brasil de 1823, part 2.)

The Brazilian Constituent Assembly of 1823 was the first constituent assembly of Brazil, installed on 3 May 1823, under the presidency of the Major Chaplain Bishop, José Caetano da Silva Coutinho. The Assembly was tasked with drafting Brazil's first constitution. However, its activities ended with its dissolution by the police forces of emperor Pedro I of Brazil in the early hours of 12 November 1823, an episode known as the Night of Agony.

It was the first experience of a parliamentary system in Brazil and is considered the genesis of legislature in the country.

== Predecessors ==
The starting point for the Assembly was the decree of 16 February 1822, inspired by José Bonifácio, which provided for the convocation of a Council of General Procurators of the Provinces. Their attributions would be to advise the Prince Regent, examine the great projects of reform in the administration, propose measures and plans, and advocate for the welfare of their respective provinces.

On 23 May of the same year, the Senate of the Chamber of Rio de Janeiro, led by Joaquim Gonçalves Ledo and Januário da Cunha Barbosa, wrote to the Prince Regent protesting against the secular subjection to Portugal and the imposition of the system of oppression that the Cortes intended to restore, with disrespect for the principles of morality, equality, and politics. The path of recolonization was thus prepared, unacceptable to the Provinces, which the document demonstrated could not be governed from two thousand leagues away. The text read:

"Therefore, Sir, in our name and in the name of the coalition Provinces, whose cause and sentiment are the same, we intend and request with the greatest instance and with the most just hope to the title that Your Royal Highness has accepted as Constitutional and Perpetual Defender of Brazil, that for my sake of the prosperity of the inhabitants of this Kingdom, of the integrity and greatness of the Luso-Brazilian monarchy, of our constitutionality and V. A. Real, that and it is necessary I design that a General Assembly of the Provinces of Brazil, represented by a competent number of deputies, which cannot be less than one hundred, be convened in this Court."

Pedro I convened the Council of Procurators to meet by decree on June 1. In the council's perspective, there was "the lesson that the regimes of power are made for men and not men for the regimes. The axiom of human liberties was firmly proclaimed, already formulated by the philosophy of the prevailing liberalism that made the governed a citizen and not a subject, much less a subject, who until then had been an object, as in the disastrous practice of absolutist systems." As the procurators also saw this gap, "they converged unanimously in voting in favor of the convocation of a General Assembly of Representatives of the Provinces of Brazil."

The representation received the signatures of Joaquim Gonçalves Ledo and José Mariano de Azevedo Coutinho, procurators of the province of Rio de Janeiro, and Breno Reis and Marco da Viola, of the Cisplatina province. The Ministry which had created the Council consisted of José Bonifácio de Andrada e Silva, Caetano Pinto de Miranda Montenegro, Joaquim de Oliveira Álvares, and Manoel Antonio Farinho.

The decree of June 3, 1822, was a measure to constitutionalize Brazil and preceded the act of independence, consummated on September 7. It convened a Portuguese-Brazilian Assembly, or by another denomination of the decree, a Constituent and Legislative General Assembly composed of deputies from the provinces of Brazil. It also had the free participation of Brazilians as well as Portuguese citizens domiciled in the Kingdom and who qualified for it, following instructions to be issued later.

== Creation ==
On May 3, 1823, the Constituent and Legislative General Assembly of the Empire of Brazil began its legislature with the intent of drafting the country's first constitution. On the same day, Pedro I gave a speech to the assembled deputies, stating why he had said during his coronation at the end of the previous year that the constitution should be worthy of Brazil and of himself (a phrase that had been the idea of José Bonifácio, not of the emperor):

"As Constitutional Emperor, and most especially as Perpetual Defender of this Empire, I said to the people on December 1st of last year, when I was crowned and consecrated - that with my sword I would defend the Homeland, the Nation, and the Constitution, if it were worthy of Brazil and of me. A Constitution in which the three powers are well divided. A Constitution that, by placing inaccessible barriers to despotism, whether royal, aristocratic, or democratic, chases away anarchy and plants the tree of liberty in whose shade should grow the union, tranquility, and independence of this Empire, which will be the wonder of the new and old world. All the Constitutions, which in the manner of 1791 and 1792 have established their bases, and have wanted to organize themselves, experience has shown us that they are totally theoretical and metaphysical, and therefore unworkable: so proves France, Spain and, lately, Portugal. They have not, as they should, made the general happiness, but rather, after a licentious liberty, we see that in some countries despotism is already appearing, and in others is soon to appear, in one, after having been exercised by many, the necessary consequence being that the peoples are reduced to the sad situation of witnessing and suffering all the horrors of anarchy."

Pedro I reminded the deputies in his speech that the constitution should prevent possible abuses not only by the monarch but also by the political class and the population itself. To this end, it would be necessary to avoid implanting laws in the country that would be disrespected in practice. At first, the assembly was willing to accept the emperor's request, but some deputies felt uncomfortable with Pedro I's speech.

One of them, the deputy from Pernambuco, Andrade de Lima, clearly expressed his discontent, claiming that the monarch's sentence was too ambiguous. The deputies in the Constituent Assembly were mostly moderate liberals, gathering "what was best and most representative in Brazil". They were elected in an indirect manner and by census vote, and did not belong to parties, which did not yet exist in the country.

There were, however, factions among the deputies, and three were discernible:

- The "Bonifácios", who were led by José Bonifácio and defended the existence of a strong but constitutional and centralized monarchy, to avoid the possibility of fragmentation of the country, and intended to abolish the slave trade and slavery, carry out an agrarian reform and economically develop the country free of foreign loans.
- The "Portuguese absolutists", who comprised not only the Portuguese, but also Brazilians and defended an absolute and centralized monarchy, besides the maintenance of their economic and social privileges.
- And finally, the "federalist liberals", who counted in their ranks with Portuguese and Brazilians, and preached a decentralized monarchy, if possible federal, together with the maintenance of slavery, besides vehemently fighting the projects of Bonifácio.

Ideologically, the emperor identified with the "Bonifácios" both concerning social and economic projects and in relation to political ones, as he had no interest in acting as an absolute monarch, or to serve as "a cardboard figure in government."

The draft of the 1823 constitution was written by Antônio Carlos de Andrada, who was strongly influenced by the French and Norwegian charters. It was then sent to the Constituent Assembly, where the deputies started working on the charter. There were several differences between the 1823 project and the later Constitution of 1824. On the issue of federalism, it was centralizing, as it divided the country into comarcas (judicial divisions, not administrative ones). The qualifications for suffrage were much more restrictive than the 1824 charter. The charter also defined that only free men in Brazil would be considered Brazilian citizens, and not the slaves who would eventually be freed, unlike the 1824 constitution.

The separation of the three powers was foreseen, the Executive being delegated to the emperor, but the responsibility for their acts would fall on the Ministers of State. The Constituent Assembly also chose to include a suspensive veto by the Emperor (as in 1824), who could even veto the draft constitution if he so wished. However, changes in the political course of affairs led the deputies to propose making the monarch a symbolic figure, completely subordinate to the assembly. This fact, followed by the approval of a project on June 12, 1823, by which the laws created by the body would dispense with the emperor's sanction, led Pedro I to clash with the Constituent Assembly.

Behind the dispute between the emperor and the assembly, there was another, deeper dispute, that was the real cause of the dissolution of the Constituent Assembly. Since the beginning of the legislative work, the Federalist liberals had as their main intention to overthrow the ministry presided over by José Bonifácio at any cost and to take revenge for the persecutions they had suffered during the "Bonifácia" of the previous year. The Portuguese absolutists, on the other hand, saw their interests harmed when José Bonifácio issued the decrees of November 12, 1822, and December 11, 1822, wherein the first eliminated the privileges of the Portuguese and in the second sequestered the goods, merchandise, and properties belonging to them that had supported Portugal during the Brazilian independence. Despite their differences, the Portuguese and the Liberals were allied to remove their common enemy from power. The liberals and Portuguese enticed the:

"Andradas' enemies, whose valor with the Emperor stirred up much envy and whose haughtiness, sometimes coarse, gave rise to many a grievance and wounded many a vanity. Tough on their adversaries, the "Andradas" had made plenty of enemies out of the prestige they had earned through their intellectual superiority and honesty. The malcontents united to overthrow them, and in the alliance, they mixed moderates with the exalted"

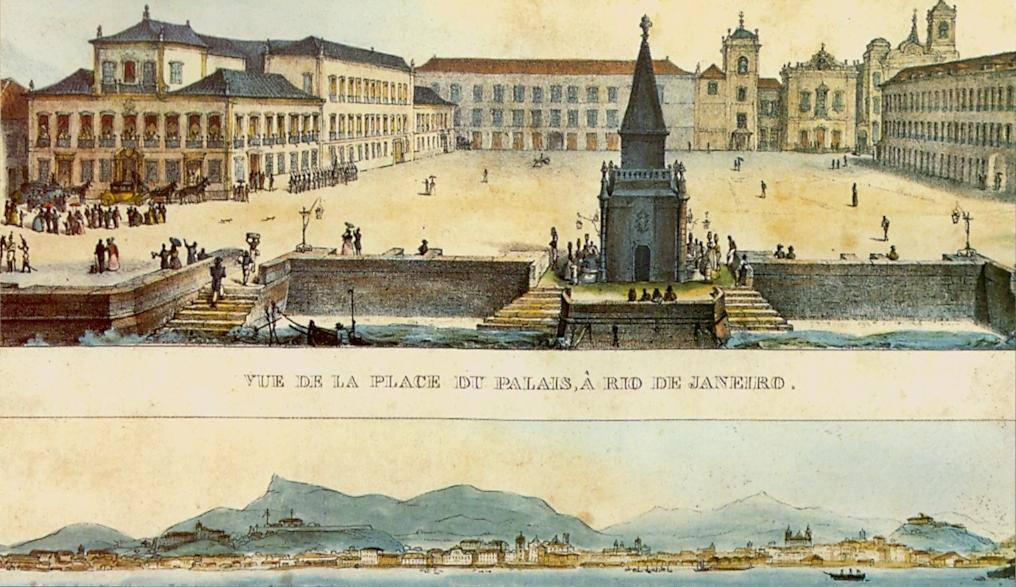
View of the Imperial Palace (left) where Pedro I watched from afar the work of the Constituent Assembly taking place in the building next door.

The two allied factions enlisted the emperor's close friends on their side, who tried to end the monarch's friendship with José Bonifácio. Seeing most of the Assembly openly dissatisfied with the Andrada ministry and influenced by his friends, who identified with the interests of the Portuguese, Pedro I dismissed the ministers of state. A war of attacks began between the country's newspapers, which defended one political faction or the other.

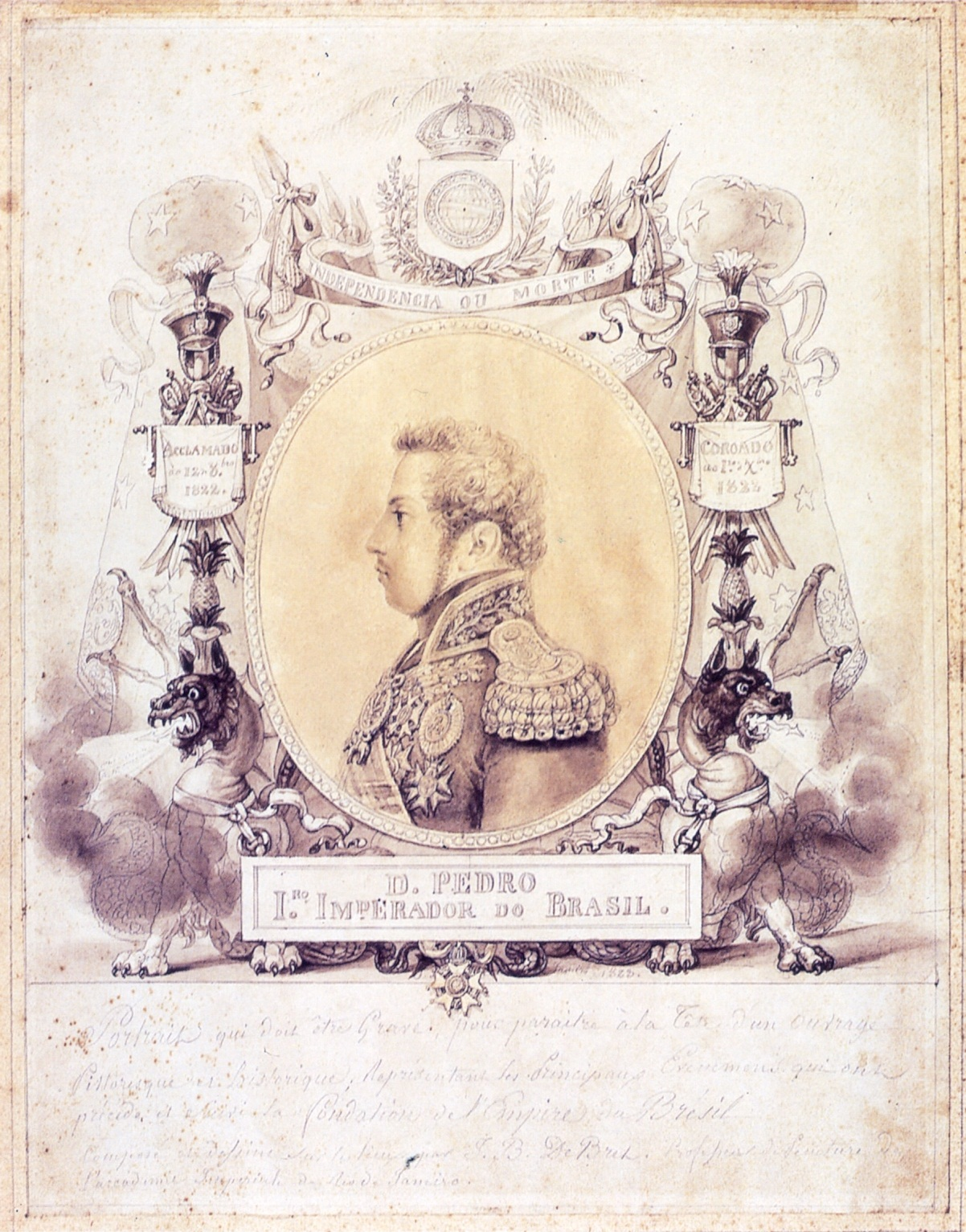
Pedro I, around the time of the Constituent Assembly of 1823

The alliance between the liberals and the Portuguese was short-lived. As soon as the Andrada ministry was dismissed, the two groups turned against each other. For the monarch, any relationship with the liberals would be inadmissible, as they intended to place him as a "puppet". The attacks against the Portuguese in general and even against Pedro by newspapers and deputies in favor of the "Andradas" led the emperor to approach the Portuguese.

The crisis became more serious when an episode that would normally be ignored was used for political purposes. A Brazilian-born apothecary, who also practiced journalism, was physically attacked by two Portuguese officers who mistakenly believed him to be the author of a libelous article. The "Andradas" took the opportunity to claim that the aggression suffered by the apothecary was an attack on the honor of Brazil and the Brazilian people. Antônio Carlos de Andrada and Martim Francisco de Andrada were carried off on the shoulders of a crowd and a wave of anti-Portuguese xenophobia followed, which further inflamed tempers.

Pedro watched the episode from the window of the Paço Imperial next to the "Cadeia Velha", the place where the Constituent Assembly was being held. The emperor ordered the army to prepare for a conflict. Pedro I had the guarantee of the officialdom, which would be threatened by the insults directed at itself and the emperor by the newspapers allied to the "Andradas", making the emperor demanded punishment for them. The deputies showed apprehension and demanded answers as to the reason for the gathering of troops in São Cristóvão. The minister of the empire, Francisco Vilela Barbosa, representing the government, addressed the assembly demanding that the Andradas brothers be prosecuted for their alleged abuses.

The assembled deputies debated the government's proposal and remained in session through the early hours of the morning. But the next day, when Vilela Barbosa returned to the Assembly to explain the gathering of troops, some deputies shouted demanding that Pedro I be declared an "outlaw". The emperor upon hearing this, even before the minister of the Empire returned from the Assembly, signed the decree dissolving the Constituent. About the episode, Oliveira Lima stated that:

"The dawn of the 'Night of Agony' nevertheless illuminated no martyrdom. The deputies, who had declared themselves ready to be struck down by imperial bayonets, quietly returned to their homes, without the soldiers bothering them. Six only were deported to France, among them the three "Andradas"."

The Portuguese proposed to Pedro I that he send the "Andradas" to Portugal because there they would most likely be sentenced to death for their participation in the Brazilian independence. They asked only for his consent. "No! I do not consent because it is a perfidy [disloyalty]," the monarch replied. Despite Pedro I's apprehension about the possibility of becoming a null figure in the country's government and his demonstration of discontent, it was not the main reason for the closure of the Constituent.

The deputies were caught up in disputes for power and defended their interests, bringing the capital of the empire to the brink of anarchy. This was not the end of the deputies, however. Out of the Constituent Assembly came 33 senators, 28 ministers of state, 18 provincial presidents, 7 members of the first council of state, and 4 regents of the empire.

== Dissolution ==
The Constituent Assembly was dissolved by the Emperor during the Night of Agony, in the early hours of November 12, 1823, before it could conclude its debates and deliberation on the draft Constitution.

In the episode of the dissolution, Pedro I's forces arrested opponents, who were soon deported. The next day, the Emperor appointed people he trusted to the Council of State, who were to conclude behind closed doors the work begun by the Constituent Assembly. The result was presented to the Emperor on December 11, 1823. On March 25, 1824, the Constitution of the Empire was sworn in without submission to a new Assembly.

Upon the dissolution of the Constituent Assembly, Pedro I stated that he would convoke another one, "which shall work on the project of the constitution, that I shall soon present to you, which will be twice as liberal as the extinct Assembly was." However, the compromise did not become effective.

The origin of the Council of State that presented the draft Constitution lies in the law of October 20, 1823, which extinguished the Council of Procurators and instituted the Ministers as the Council of State. José Joaquim Carneiro de Campos, future Marquis of Caravelas, is considered the main author of the text drafted by the Council of State, which would be granted by the Emperor the following year.

== See also ==
- Brazilian Constituent Assembly (1988)
- Brazilian Constitution of 1891
- History of the Constitution of Brazil

== Bibliography ==
- Holanda, Sérgio Buarque de (1976). O Brasil Monárquico: o processo de emancipação (in Portuguese). São Paulo: Difusão Europeia do Livro.
- Lima, Manuel de Oliveira (1989). O Império brasileiro (in Portuguese). São Paulo: USP.
- Lustosa, Isabel (2007). D. Pedro I (in Portuguese). São Paulo: Companhia das Letras.
