= Institutional Acts =

1967 legislation in Brazil

The Institutional Acts were extra-legal decrees issued by the Brazilian military dictatorship between 1964 and 1969. The acts were not subject to judicial review and superseded the 1946 constitution, serving as a vehicle for major legislative reforms that precluded the removal of the constitution.

There were 17 Institutional Acts and over 100 Complementary Acts, which elaborated on the former's general intent. The need for a comprehensive legal framework for the regime eventually led to the enactment of the 1967 constitution.

The acts were rescinded in the late 1970s during the redemocratization of Brazil.

== Institutional Act no. 1 (AI-1) ==
The first Institutional Act, written by Francisco Campos, was issued on April 9, 1964 by the military junta and gave greater power to the Brazilian executive. These powers included the authority to amend the constitution, propose expenditure bills to Congress, suppress the political rights of citizens for ten years, and rescind the tenure of military officials and government employees.

Subsequent acts such as Institutional Act no. 2 dissolved political parties and established the indirect election of the president through a congressional Electoral College. Further acts removed direct elections of governors and city mayors.

== Institutional Act no. 5 (AI-5) ==
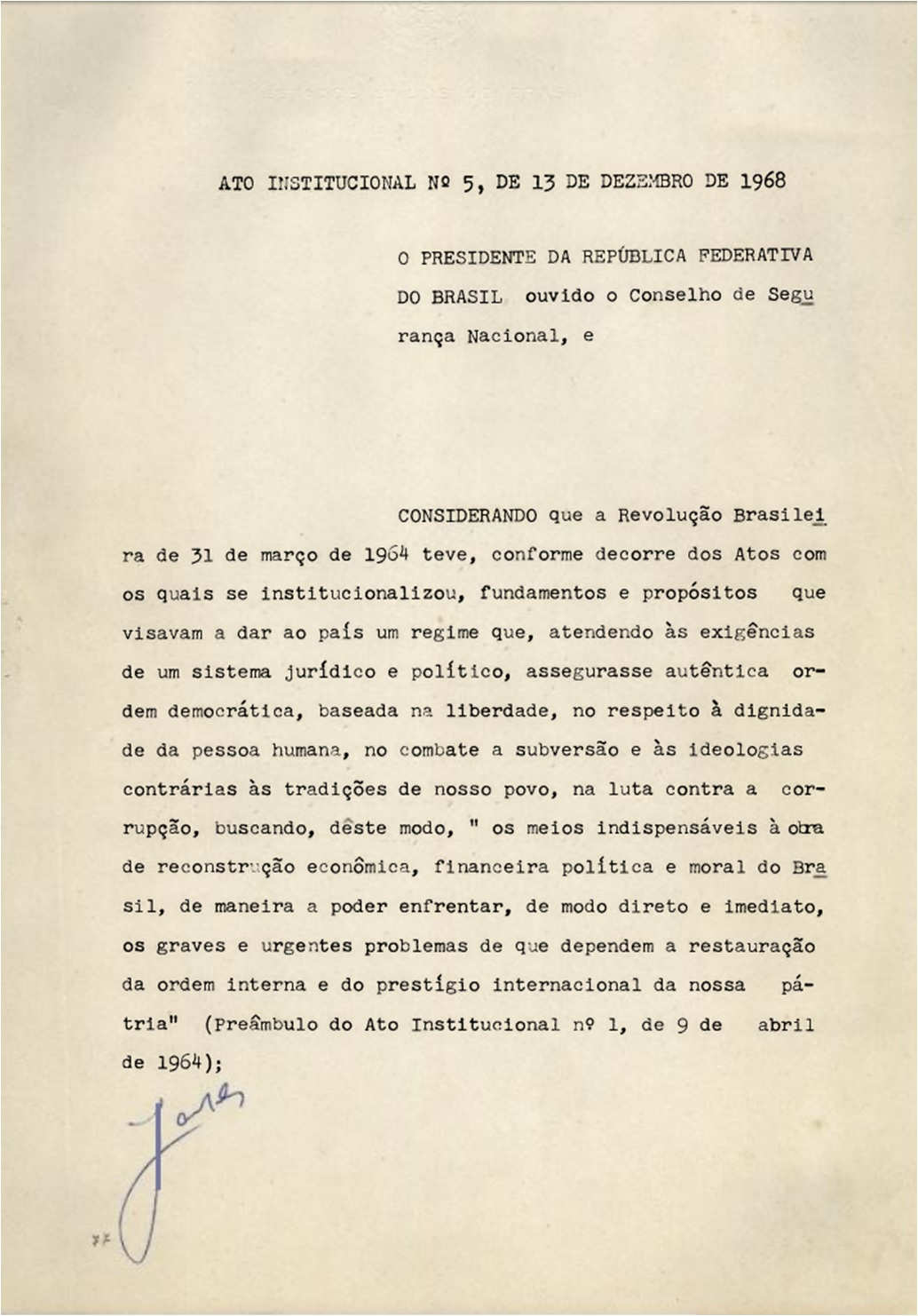
The first page of AI-5 from the Brazilian National Archives

The military government's fifth institutional act was issued by President Artur da Costa e Silva and the National Security Council on December 13, 1968. This act suspended Congress, introduced television and radio censorship, removed habeas corpus for suspects of political crimes, and gave the president control over state and local governments.

Immediately following this act, many members of Congress and Supreme Court Justices were expelled. Many politicians, professors, and dissenters were arrested or exiled, including Fernando Henrique Cardoso, who would become president in 1995 after redemocratization.

== See also ==
- Brazilian Military Criminal Code
