= Brazilian Constitution of 1824 =

Brazil's first constitution

Political Constitution of the Empire of Brazil
- Cover of the imperial constitution of 1824 in the custody of the Brazilian National Archives

Overview
- Jurisdiction: Empire of Brazil
- Date effective: 25 March 1824 – 15 November 1889
- System: Unitary parliamentary semi-constitutional monarchy

Government structure
- Branches: Four (executive, legislative, judiciary, moderating)
- Chambers: Bicameral: Senate and the Chamber of Deputies.
- Executive: Emperor
- Judiciary: Supreme Court of Justice
- Federalism: Unitary
- Electoral college: Yes
- First legislature: 6 May 1826
- First court: 9 January 1829
- Location: Brazilian National Archives
- Commissioned by: Pedro I of Brazil
- Author: Council of State
- Signatories: List: Pedro I of Brazil Maciel da Costa Carvalho e Melo Ferreira França Pereira da Fonseca Silveira Mendonça Vilela Barbosa Álvares de Almeida Pereira da Cunha Nogueira da Gama Carneiro de Campos
- Superseded by: Brazilian Constitution of 1891

Full text
- Constitution of the Empire of Brazil at Wikisource

The Political Constitution of the Empire of Brazil (Portuguese: Constituição Política do Império do Brasil) commonly referred to as the Constitution of 1824, was Brazil's first constitution, issued on 25 March 1824 and revoked on 24 February 1891. In force during the period of the Empire of Brazil, it was issued at the emperor's request, that is, unilaterally imposed by the will of emperor Pedro I, who had ordered it from the Council of State. Pedro had dissolved the Constituent Assembly in 1823 and, through the Constitution of 1824, imposed his own political project on the country. The same Pedro later issued, in Portugal, the Constitutional Charter of 29 April 1826, inspired by the Brazilian model.

It remained in force for 65 years, until the promulgation of the Constitution of 1891, followed by Decree No. 1 of 15 November 1889, which replaced the political ordering of the Empire of Brazil. It was the longest-running constitution in Brazil. Among its innovations were freedom of religious worship (although the official State religion remained Catholic), freedom of the press and opinion, and the institution of the Moderating Power.

== History ==
=== General Constituent Assembly of 1823 ===
The elaboration of the 1824 Constitution was an exhausting, extensive and very troubled process. Shortly after the proclamation of Brazil's independence from the United Kingdom of Portugal, Brazil and the Algarves, on 7 September 1822, a conflict between radicals and conservatives emerged, which was reflected in the composition of the constituent assembly, installed in 1823.

On 3 May 1823, the General Constituent and Legislative Assembly of the Empire of Brazil began the legislature with the aim of drafting the country's first constitution. Among the constituent deputies, 22 were part of the clergy. Some constituent deputies had a liberal-democratic orientation: they wanted a monarchy that limited the emperor's powers to that of a decorative figure.

On the same day, emperor Pedro I addressed the deputies, making it clear why he had stated during his coronation, at the end of the previous year, that the constitution should be "worthy of Brazil and of himself" (a phrase that was the idea of José Bonifácio):

"As Constitutional Emperor, and most especially as Perpetual Defender of this Empire, I told the people on the first day of December of the past year, on which I was crowned and sacred - that with my sword I would defend the Fatherland, Nation and the Constitution, if it were worthy of Brazil and myself..., a Constitution in which the three powers are well divided... a Constitution that, placing inaccessible barriers to despotism, whether royal, aristocratic or democratic, will scare away anarchy and plant the tree of freedom under whose shadow must grow the union, tranquility and independence of this Empire, which will be the astonishment of the New and the Old World. Experience has shown us that all the Constitutions, which, in the manner of 1791 and 1792, have laid their foundations and have tried to organize themselves, are totally theoretical and metaphysical, and therefore unfeasible: so proves France, Spain and, lately, Portugal. They have not, as they should, brought about general happiness, but, after a licentious liberty, we see that in some countries, despotism appears, and in others it does not take long to appear, after having been exercised by many, being the necessary consequence for the peoples to be reduced to the sad situation of witnessing and suffering all the horrors of anarchy".

Pedro I reminded the deputies in his speech that the Constitution should prevent possible abuses not only on the part of the monarch, but also on the part of the political class and the population itself. For that, it would be necessary to avoid implementing laws in the country that in practice would be disrespected. At first, the Assembly was ready to accept the Emperor's request, but some deputies were uncomfortable with Pedro I's speech. One of them, Andrade de Lima, a deputy for Pernambuco, clearly expressed his displeasure, claiming that the monarch's phrase had been "ambiguous", in the sense that it seemed the emperor was implying the Assembly could draft an unworthy Constitution.

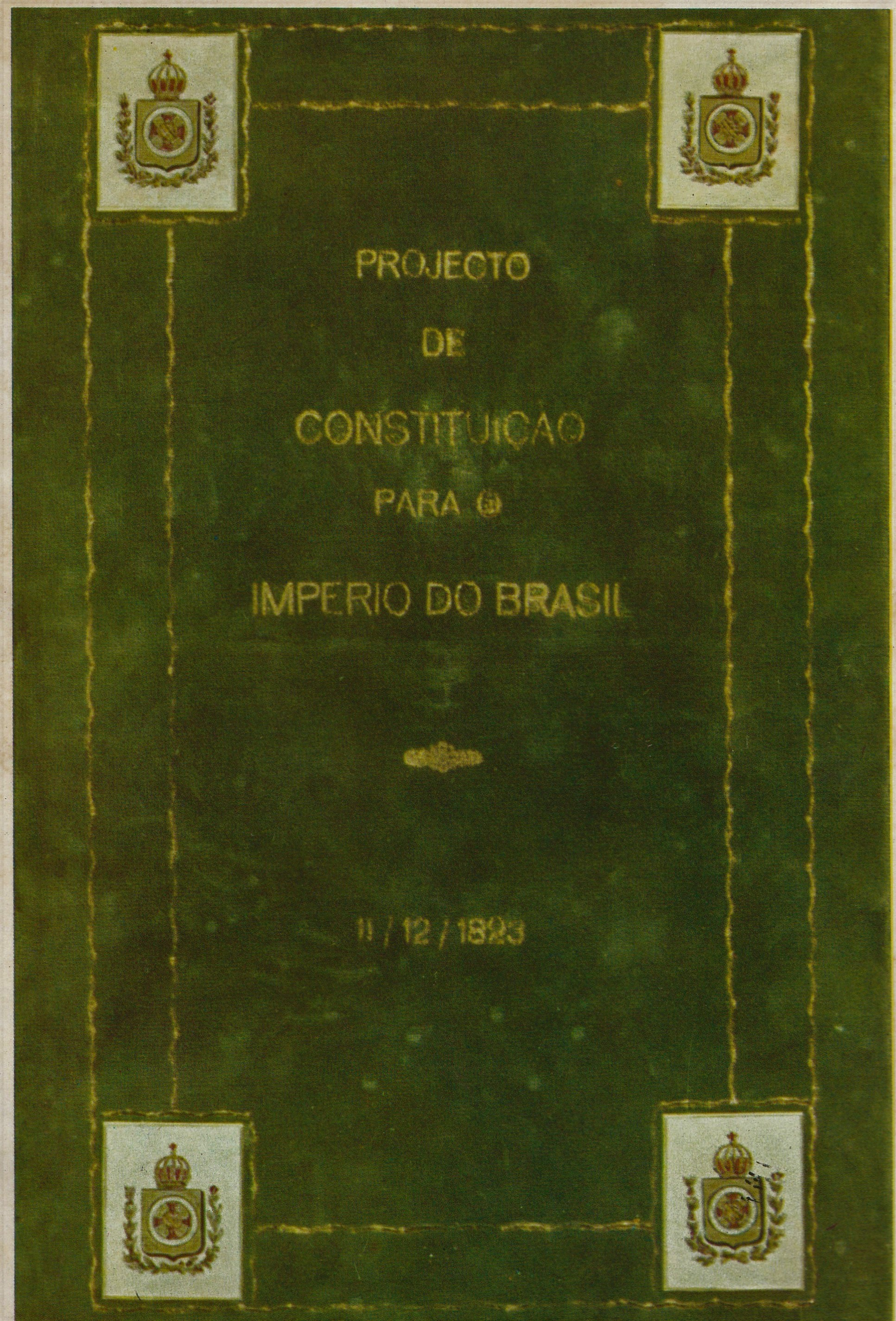
Cover of the draft made by the Constituent Assembly, Brazilian National Archives

A total of 90 deputies were elected by 14 provinces. The deputies who were in the Constituent Assembly were mostly moderate liberals, bringing together "what was best and most representative in Brazil". They were elected indirectly from and by census vote and did not belong to parties, which did not yet exist in the country. There were, however, factions among them, three of which were discernible: the "bonifácios", who were led by José Bonifácio and defended the existence of a strong monarchy, but constitutional and centralized, in order to avoid the possibility of fragmentation of the country, and intended to abolish the slave trade and slavery, carry out agrarian reform and economically develop the country free from foreign loans. The "absolutist Portuguese", which comprised not only Portuguese nationals, but also Brazilians and defended an absolute and centralized monarchy, in addition to maintaining their economic and social privileges. And finally, the "federalist liberals", who counted on both Brazilians and Portuguese in their ranks, and who preached a merely figurative and decentralized monarchy, federal if possible, together with the maintenance of slavery, in addition to vehemently fighting the projects of the bonifácios. Ideologically, the emperor identified with the bonifácios both in relation to social and economic projects, as in relation to politicians, as he had no interest either in acting as an absolute monarch, much less in serving as "a cardboard figure in the government".

The draft of the 1823 Constitution was written by Antônio Carlos Ribeiro de Andrada, who was strongly influenced by the French and Norwegian Charters. It was then sent to the Constituent Assembly, where the deputies began work to draw up the letter. There were several differences between the 1823 project and the later Constitution of 1824. In terms of federalism, the 1823 draft was centralizing, as it divided the country into comarcas, which are merely judicial and not administrative divisions. Voter qualifications were much more restrictive than the Charter of 1824. It also defined that only free men in Brazil would be considered Brazilian citizens, and not slaves who would eventually be freed, unlike the Constitution of 1824. The separation of the three powers was foreseen, with the Executive being delegated to the Emperor, but responsibility for his actions would fall on the Ministers of State. The Constituent Assembly also opted for the inclusion of the suspensive veto on the part of the emperor (as well as that of 1824), who could even veto the Constitution project itself if he so wished.

However, changes in political directions led the deputies to propose making the monarch a merely symbolic figure, completely subordinate to the Assembly. This fact, followed by the approval of a Law project on 12 June 1823, by which the laws created by the body would waive the monarch's sanction, led Pedro I to clash with the Constituent Assembly.

In theory, Pedro I, wanted, on the other hand, to maintain political and executive control through the veto, initiating a disagreement between constituents with different points of view. However, behind the dispute between the Emperor and the Assembly, there was another, deeper one, which was the real cause of the later dissolution of the Constituent Assembly. Since the beginning of the legislative work, the federalist liberals had as their main intention to overthrow the ministry presided over by José Bonifácio at any cost and to take revenge for the persecutions they suffered during the previous year.

The Portuguese absolutists, on the other hand, saw their interests injured when José Bonifácio issued the decrees of 12 November 1822 and 11 December 1822; in the first Bonifácio eliminated the privileges of the Portuguese nationals in Brazil and in the second he confiscated the goods and real estate belonging to the ones who had supported Portugal during the Brazilian War of Independence. Despite the differences, the Portuguese absolutists and the liberals allied themselves with the common goal of removing the Andrada cabinet from power. The liberals and the Portuguese enticed:

the disaffected by the Andrada brothers, whose closeness with the Emperor aroused envy and whose haughty, sometimes rude, made many squeamish and wounded many vanities. Tough with their adversaries, the Andrada brothers had created plenty of enemies in the prestige gained by their intellectual superiority and their honesty. The malcontents united to overthrow them and in the alliance the moderates united with the exalted ones.

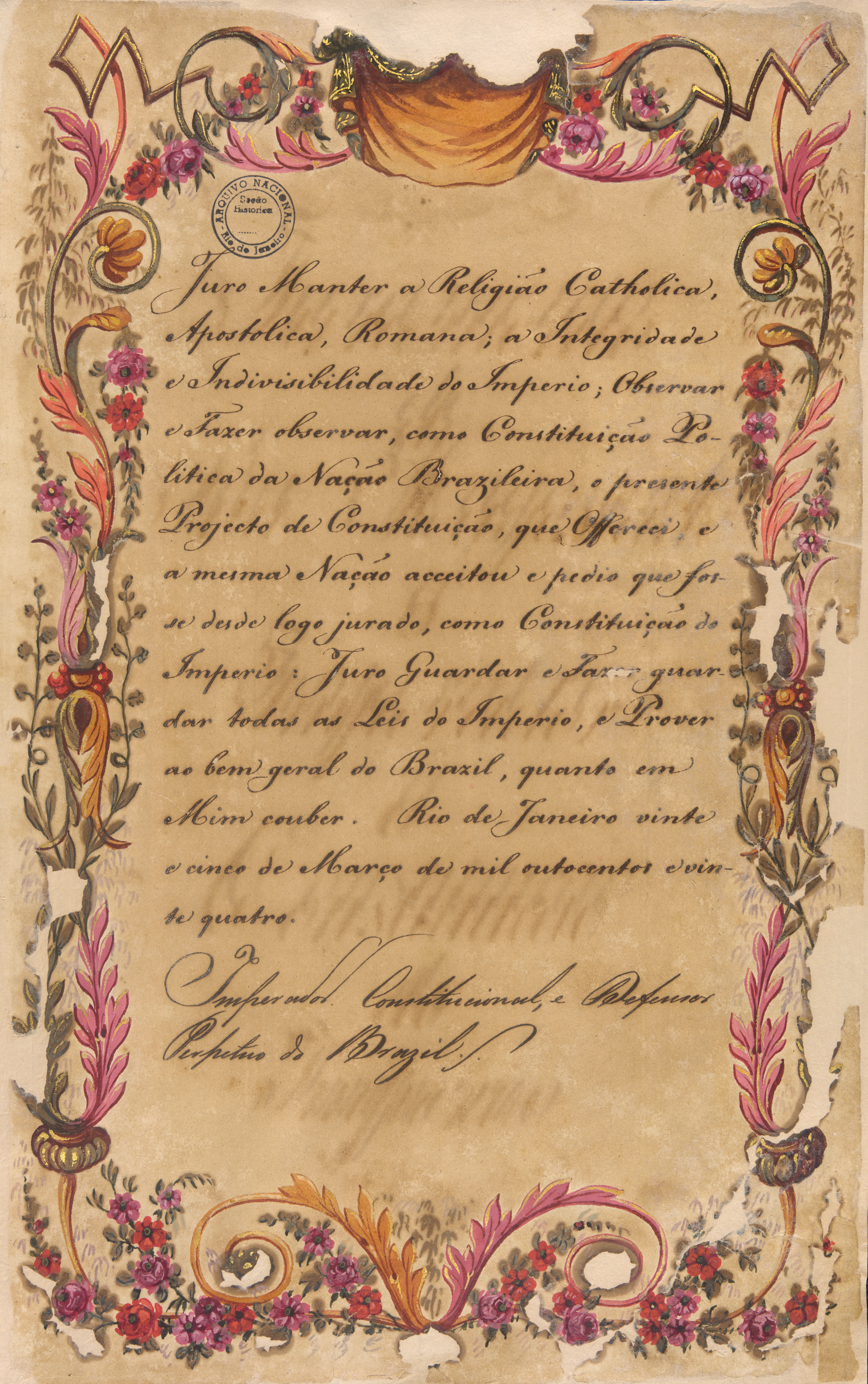
Oath of emperor Pedro I to the Constitution of the Empire, Brazilian National Archives

The two allied factions enlisted the emperor's close friends to their side, who soon tried to poison the monarch's friendship with José Bonifácio. Seeing most of the Assembly openly unhappy with the Andrada Ministry and influenced by his friends, who identified with the interests of the Portuguese, Pedro I dismissed the Andrada cabinet. A war of attacks then began between the country's newspapers, which defended one or another political faction. The alliance between the liberals and the Portuguese was ephemeral. As soon as the Andrada Ministry was fired, the two groups turned on each other. For the monarch, any relationship with liberals would be inadmissible, as he was well aware of their intentions to transform him into a merely decorative figure. The attacks against the Portuguese in general and even against Pedro I by the newspapers and deputies in favor of the Andrada brothers led the emperor to approach the Portuguese.

The crisis became even more serious when an episode that would normally be completely ignored ended up being used for political ends. On November 5, an apothecary born in Brazil, who also practiced journalism, was physically attacked by two Portuguese officers who mistakenly believed that he had been the author of an injurious article against Portuguese nationals. The Andrada brothers, who on August 12 had launched their own newspaper, O Tamoyo, took the opportunity to claim that the aggression suffered by the apothecary was in fact an attack on the honor of Brazil and the Brazilian people. Antônio Carlos de Andrada and Martim Francisco de Andrada were carried on the shoulders of a crowd and a wave of anti-Portuguese xenophobia followed, which intensified even more tempers. On the 10th, the brothers even proposed to the Assembly that the civil rights of Portuguese military and civilians be withdrawn and that they should be deported.

The emperor watched everything from the window of the Imperial Palace, which was next to the "Old Jail", the name of the place where the Constituent Assembly was being held. The emperor ordered the army to prepare for a conflict, ordering general Joaquim Xavier Curado to take his troops to São Cristóvão. Pedro I held the fidelity of the officers, who felt attacked by the insults directed at themselves and the emperor by the newspapers allied to the Andrada brothers and demanded their punishment.

The deputies showed apprehension and demanded answers about the reason for the gathering of troops in São Cristóvão. The Minister of the Empire, Francisco Vilela Barbosa, representing the government, claimed that the positioning of the troops was to avoid fights and misunderstandings. The new Chief Minister also told those present that the blame for the way things were unfolding lay with the Andrada brothers and the newspapers involved with what was happening. He also demanded that the Andrada brothers and the newspapers be prosecuted for the alleged abuses they committed. The assembled deputies debated the government's proposal and remained in session overnight. The Assembly, without reaching a peaceful resolution, refused to take decisions against the Andrada brothers and the newspapers involved. They would only do something if the troops, who were already outside the city, retreated further afield. But the next day, when Vilela Barbosa returned to the Assembly to explain the troops meeting, some deputies shouted demanding that Pedro I be declared an "outlaw".

=== Dissolution of the assembly ===
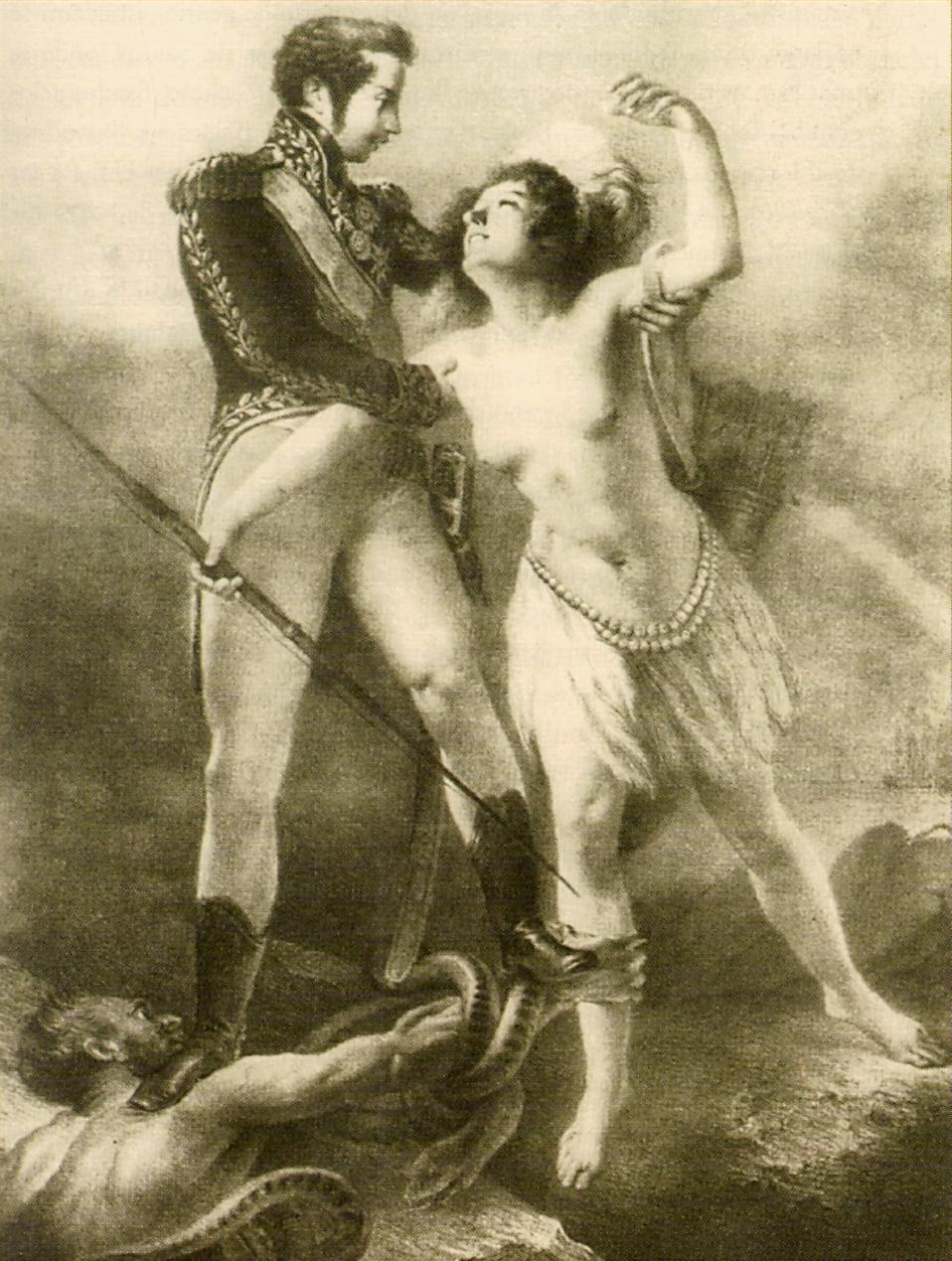
"Pedro I and the Constitution - fight against despotism". Allegory to the oath of the Brazilian Constitution of 1824

The Emperor, noting that the Assembly did not intend to take any action regarding its anti-Lusitanism, and that it would not punish neither the press nor the deputies involved, signed the decree dissolving the Constituent Assembly, even before the Minister of Empire returned from the Assembly. Pedro I ordered the army to invade the congress on 12 November 1823, arresting and exiling several deputies, this act became known as "Night of Agony". He then gathered ten citizens of his complete trust, belonging to the Portuguese Party, among them the distinguished João Gomes da Silveira Mendonça, the Marquis of Sabará. After some discussions behind closed doors, they drafted the first constitution of Brazil on 25 March 1824, being written by the archivist of the royal libraries, Luís Joaquim dos Santos Marrocos. This new Charter, according to the Emperor, was twice as liberal as the one being drafted by the assembly. Pedro I would repeat the same process two years later, as Pedro IV of Portugal, participating in the drafting of the Portuguese constitution of 1826. About the episode, Oliveira Lima stated that:

The dawn of the 'night of agony' did not, however, illuminate any martyrdom. The deputies who had declared themselves ready to be pierced by the imperial bayonets, returned calmly to their rooms, without the soldiers bothering them. Only six were deported to France, among them the three Andrada brothers.

The Portuguese proposed to Pedro I that he send the Andrada brothers to Portugal because there they would most likely be sentenced to death for their participation in Brazilian independence, asking for the emperor's consent, who vehemently refused. Despite Pedro I's apprehension about the possibility of becoming a null figure in the country's government and his demonstration of discontent, it was not the main reason for the closure of the Constituent Assembly. Deputies should have met to draft a Constitution for the country and debate its articles. However, they lost themselves in power struggles and only to defend their own interests brought the capital of the Empire to the edge of anarchy. This was not the end of the deputies, however. 33 senators, 28 ministers of state, 18 provincial presidents, 7 members of the first council of state and 4 regents of the Empire emerged from the Constituent Assembly.

=== Issuing of the 1824 Constitution ===
It was not Pedro I's desire to rule as a despot, as "his ambition was to be guarded by the love of his people and the fidelity of his troops and not impose his tyranny". The emperor, for this reason, instructed the Council of State, created on 13 November 1823 to write a new draft Constitution that would be finalized in just fifteen days. It was a "council of notables" made up of renowned jurists, all of whom were Brazilian by birth. The group included Carneiro de Campos, the main author of the new Charter, as well as Vilela Barbosa, Maciel da Costa, Nogueira da Gama, Carvalho e Melo, among others. The Council of State used the Assembly's draft as a basis and as soon as it was finished, it sent a copy of the new Constitution to all municipal councils. The Charter was expected to serve as a blueprint for a new Constituent Assembly. However, the municipal councils suggested instead that the project be adopted "immediately" as the Brazilian Constitution. Subsequently, the municipal councils, composed of councilors elected by the Brazilian people as their representatives, voted in favor of its adoption as the Constitution of independent Brazil. Very few chambers made any kind of observation on the Constitution and practically none made any reservations. The first Brazilian Constitution was then issued by Pedro I and solemnly sworn in at the Cathedral of the Rio de Janeiro, by the emperor, his wife, Leopoldina of Austria, and the other authorities, on 25 March 1824.

== Characteristics ==
The Charter issued in 1824 was influenced by the French Constitution of 1791, the Spanish Constitution of 1812, the Norwegian and the Portuguese. It was a "beautiful document of French-style liberalism", with a representative system based on the theory of national sovereignty. The form of government was monarchical, hereditary, constitutional and representative, with the country formally divided into provinces and political power divided into four, according to the liberal philosophy of the theories of separation of powers and Benjamin Constant. The Constitution was one of the most liberal in existence at the time, even surpassing the European ones. It was more liberal, in several points, and less centralized than the Assembly's draft, revealing that the "constituent deputies of the first reign were perfectly up to date with the ideas of the time". Although the Constitution provided for the possibility of religious freedom only in the domestic sphere, in practice it was total; both Protestants, Jews and followers of other religions maintained their religious temples and the most complete freedom of worship. It contained an innovation, which was the Moderating Power. This Power would serve to "resolve impasses and ensure the functioning of the government". The separation between the Executive and the Moderating power arose from the practice in the British monarchical-parliamentary system.

There were in the Constitution "some of the best possibilities of the liberal revolution that was going on in the West – those that would bear fruit, albeit imperfectly, in the reign of Pedro II". Isabel Lustosa says that "according to [Neill] Macaulay, Pedro I provided an unusual Charter, under which Brazil safeguarded for more than 65 years the basic rights of citizens better 'than any other nation in the Western Hemisphere, with the possible exception of the United States'". According to João de Scantimburgo:

"Pedro I and his constituents had the good sense to choose the best regime for the tropical nation, which was emancipating itself in America, without copying the already consolidated United States, and the Spanish-American nations plagued by endless disputes and by the relay of brief democratic periods and caudillo-esque dictatorships".

=== Structure ===
The 1824 Constitution is divided into eight titles, which in turn are divided into several chapters:

- Title 1 - On the Empire of Brazil, its territory, government, dynasty, and religion;
- Title 2 – On the Brazilian citizens;
- Title 3 – On the powers and national representation;
- Title 4 – On the Legislative Power;
- Title 5 – On the Emperor;
  - Chapter I – On the Moderating Power.
- Title 6 - On the Judicial Power;
- Title 7 – On the administration and economy of the provinces;
- Title 8 - On the general provisions and guarantees of civil and political rights of Brazilian citizens.

== Term and reforms ==
The constitution received important modifications through the 1834 Additional Act, which, among other changes, created the provincial legislative assemblies thus granting more autonomy to the provinces, and the Law of Interpretation of Additional Act of 1840. It is, to this day, the Brazilian constitution that had the longest term: 65 years. It was revoked after the enacting of Brazil's first republican constitution in 1891, following the coup d'état that deposed emperor Pedro II and proclaimed the republic in Brazil.

== See also ==
- Politics of the Empire of Brazil
- Reverse parliamentarism
