= Moderating power (Empire of Brazil) =

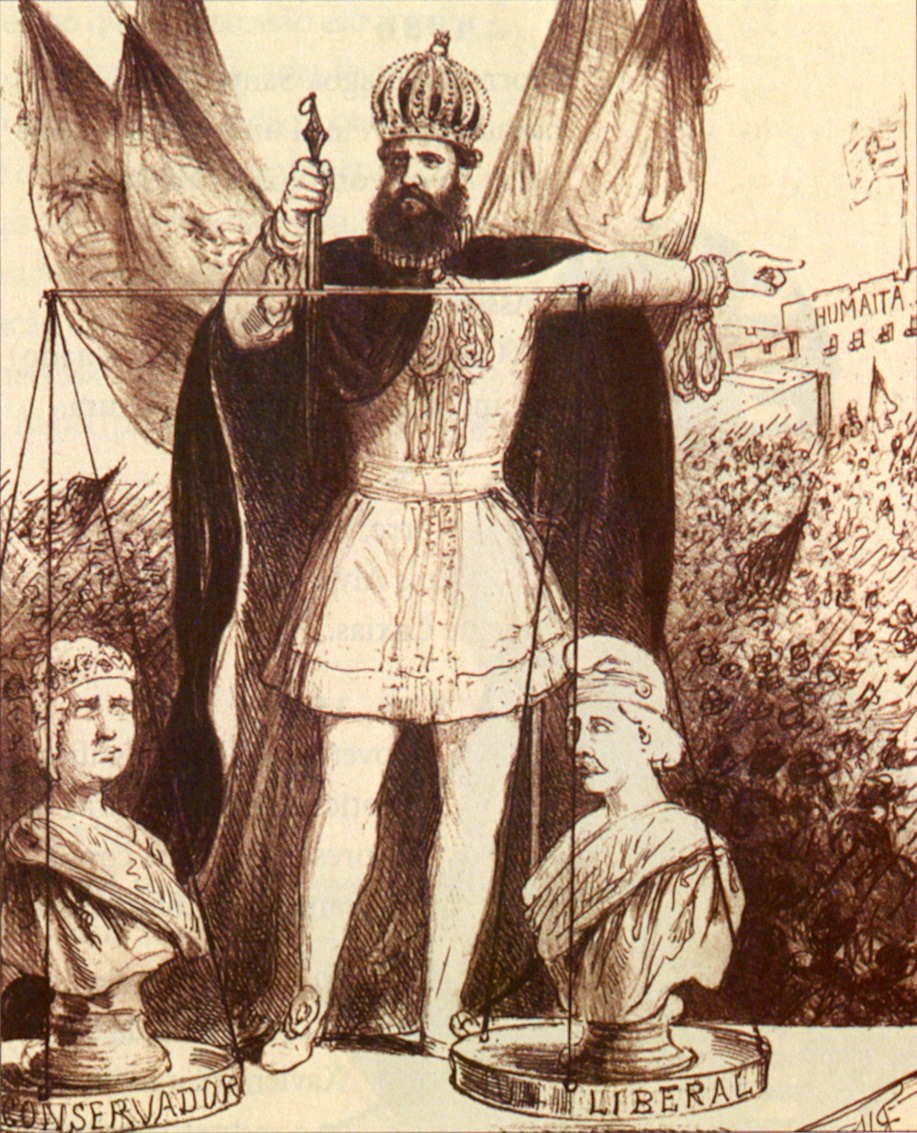
Illustration showing emperor Pedro II holding the balance between the Liberal and Conservative parties while pointing to the Fortress of Humaitá; Henrique Fleiuss, 1865

The Moderating power (Portuguese: Poder moderador) in the Empire of Brazil was the fourth state branch instituted by the 1824 Brazilian Constitution alongside the Executive, Legislative and Judiciary.

This fourth branch, exclusively exercised by the emperor, served as a "mechanism for absorbing the attrition between the legislative and executive branches" and in its role as "keeper of the balance", it granted emperor Pedro II throughout his reign "that situation of primacy which he exercised with so much pleasure and peace".

When analyzing the Moderating Power and the parliamentary government, Tobias Barreto explained the reason for the adoption of both by arguing that:

"[The] institutions that are not a product of customs, but rather a product of reason, do not withstand the test of experience for a long time and soon break up against the facts".

Galvão Sousa argued that, thanks to the Moderating Power, Brazil was able to "open a valve through which it could escape parliamentary anarchy". According to historian João Camilo Torres, the reason for the existence of the Moderating Power was due to the fact that "the monarch, due to dynastic continuity, not being part of groups, classes, nor having regional connections, owing his power to parties or economic groups, having electoral promises to keep, not needing to 'think ahead' – as the future of his family will be guaranteed if peace and national grandeur are preserved – since he is not subject to the temptation to avail himself of a quick passage through his government to take personal benefits and advantages at the expense of the nation, leaving the burden to his successors", as his "successor is his own son, and History often charges grandchildren with crimes committed by their grandparents".

== Prerogatives ==
Article 99 of the 1824 Brazilian Constitution declared that "the person of the Emperor is inviolable and sacred; he is not subject to any responsibility". Such declaration was not a unique feature of the Brazilian constitutional regime in the 19th century and still exists in several parliamentary monarchies.

The powers reserved for the Moderating Power should be exercised only after the Council of State had been consulted. Such prerogatives, which were listed in Article 101, were identical, for the most part, to the attributions reserved for current monarchs, such as:

1. Convene the General Assembly (Parliament) extraordinarily between sessions;
2. Enact the decrees and resolutions of the General Assembly, so that they have the force of law;
3. Prolong or postpone the General Assembly and dissolve the Chamber of Deputies, calling another immediately to replace the previous one;
4. Freely appoint and dismiss Ministers of State;
5. Pardon and moderate sentences imposed on defendants and grant amnesty.

The other prerogatives were: to suspend magistrates for complaints against their persons, but only after holding a hearing with them, collecting all pertinent information and listening to the Council of State; approving or suspending the resolutions of Provincial Councils (as the State Chambers of Deputies were called) and nominating senators through a list of the three candidates with the most popular votes.

According to Paulo Bonavides, the Moderating Power "can only be estimated in the incomparable consequences it had for the consolidation of national unity and for the stability of the Empire's political system", in a "continent politically plagued by civil hatred and pulverized into weak and rival republics". For Galvão Sousa, the Moderating Power under Pedro II, "gave rise to the famous 'dictatorship of honesty'. It soon became the personal power of the monarch, always exercised with a high public spirit".
