= Kathleen Hall Jamieson =

American academic

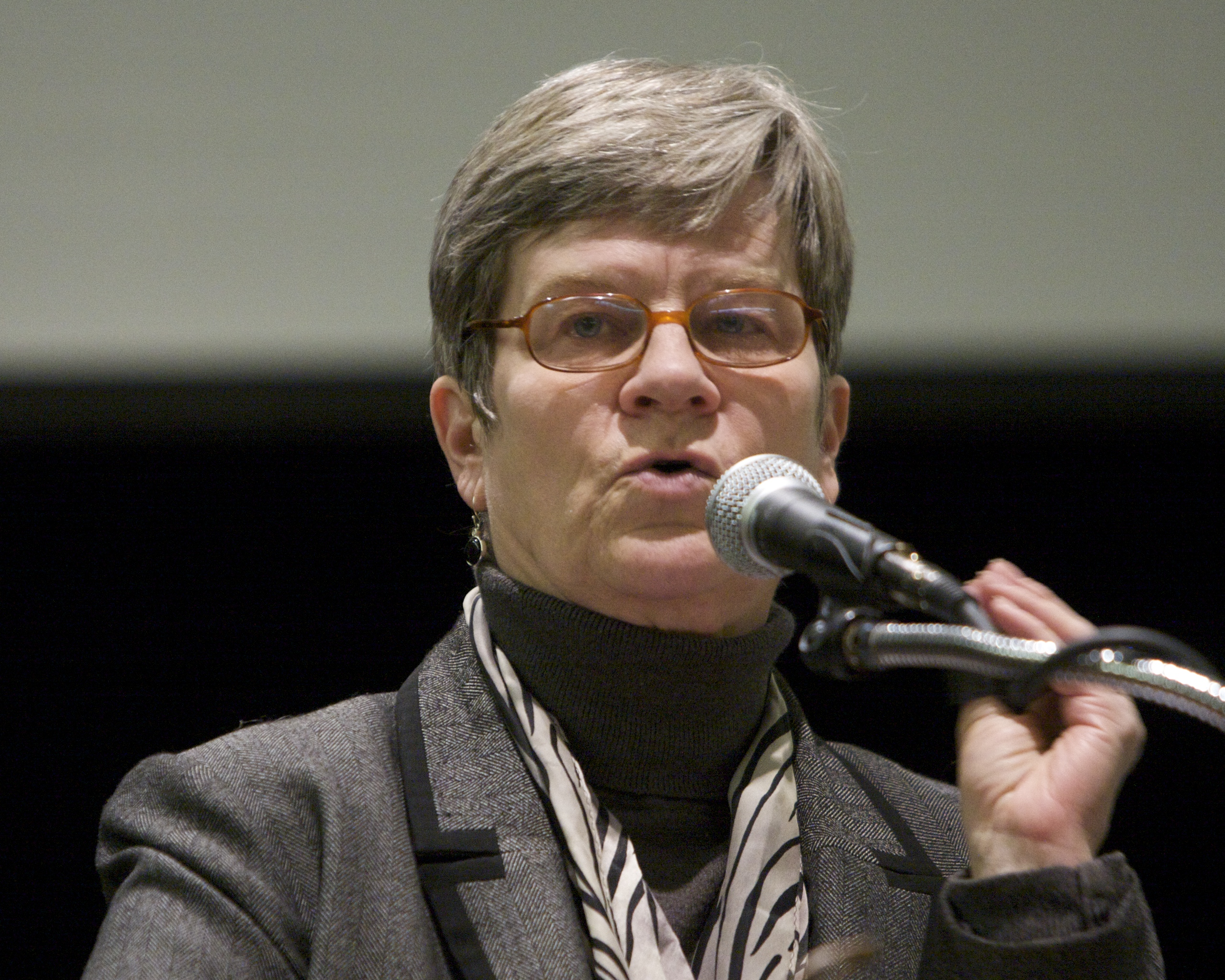
- Jamieson in 2011
- Born: November 24, 1946 (age 79); Minneapolis, Minnesota

Academic background
- Education: Marquette University; University of Wisconsin-Madison

Academic work
- Discipline: Communication Arts
- Institutions: University of Maryland; University of Texas; University of Pennsylvania

Kathleen Hall Jamieson (born November 24, 1946) is an American author, professor of communication and the director of the Annenberg Public Policy Center at the University of Pennsylvania. She is also the co-founder of FactCheck.org. Her most recent book, Cyberwar (2018), focuses on Russian interference in the 2016 Presidential election, which she argues was likely a decisive factor in Donald Trump's win.

== Early life and education ==
Jamieson was born on November 24, 1946, in Minneapolis, Minnesota. She received her BA in Rhetoric and Public Address from Marquette University in 1967, her MA in Communication Arts from the University of Wisconsin-Madison the following year, and her PhD in Communication Arts from the University of Wisconsin-Madison in 1972.

== Academic career ==
From 1971 to 1986, Jamieson served as a professor in the Department of Communication at the University of Maryland. She held the G. B. Dealey Regents Professorship while at the University of Texas from 1986 to 1989, served as the Dean of the Annenberg School for Communication of the University of Pennsylvania from 1989 to 2003 and Director of its Annenberg Public Policy Center from 1993 to the present. Her research areas include political communication, rhetorical theory and criticism, studies of various forms of campaign communication, and the discourse of the presidency.

Jamieson has won university-wide teaching awards at each of the three universities at which she has taught and has delivered the American Political Science Association's Ithiel de Sola Poole Lecture, the National Communication Association's Arnold Lecture, and the NASEM Division of Behavioral and Social Sciences and Education Henry and Bryna David Lecture.

Jamieson's work has been funded by the FDA and the MacArthur, Ford, Carnegie, Pew, Robert Wood Johnson, Packard, and Annenberg Foundations. She is the co-founder of FactCheck.org and its subsidiary site, SciCheck, and director of The Sunnylands Constitution Project, which has produced more than 30 award-winning films on the Constitution for high school students.

Jamieson has been a fellow of the National Academy of Sciences since 2020, and a member of the American Philosophical Society since 1997, the American Academy of Arts and Sciences, the American Academy of Political and Social Science, and the International Communication Association. She is a distinguished scholar of the National Communication Association. She received the U.S. National Academy of Sciences Public Welfare Medal in 2020.

== Publications and awards ==
Jamieson is the author or co-author of more than 10 works, many of which focus primarily on campaign criticism and the discourse of the presidency. Some of her most notable books are Presidents Creating the Presidency (University of Chicago Press, 2008), Echo Chamber: Rush Limbaugh and the Conservative Media Establishment (Oxford University Press, 2008), and unSpun: Finding Facts in a World of Disinformation (Random House, 2007).

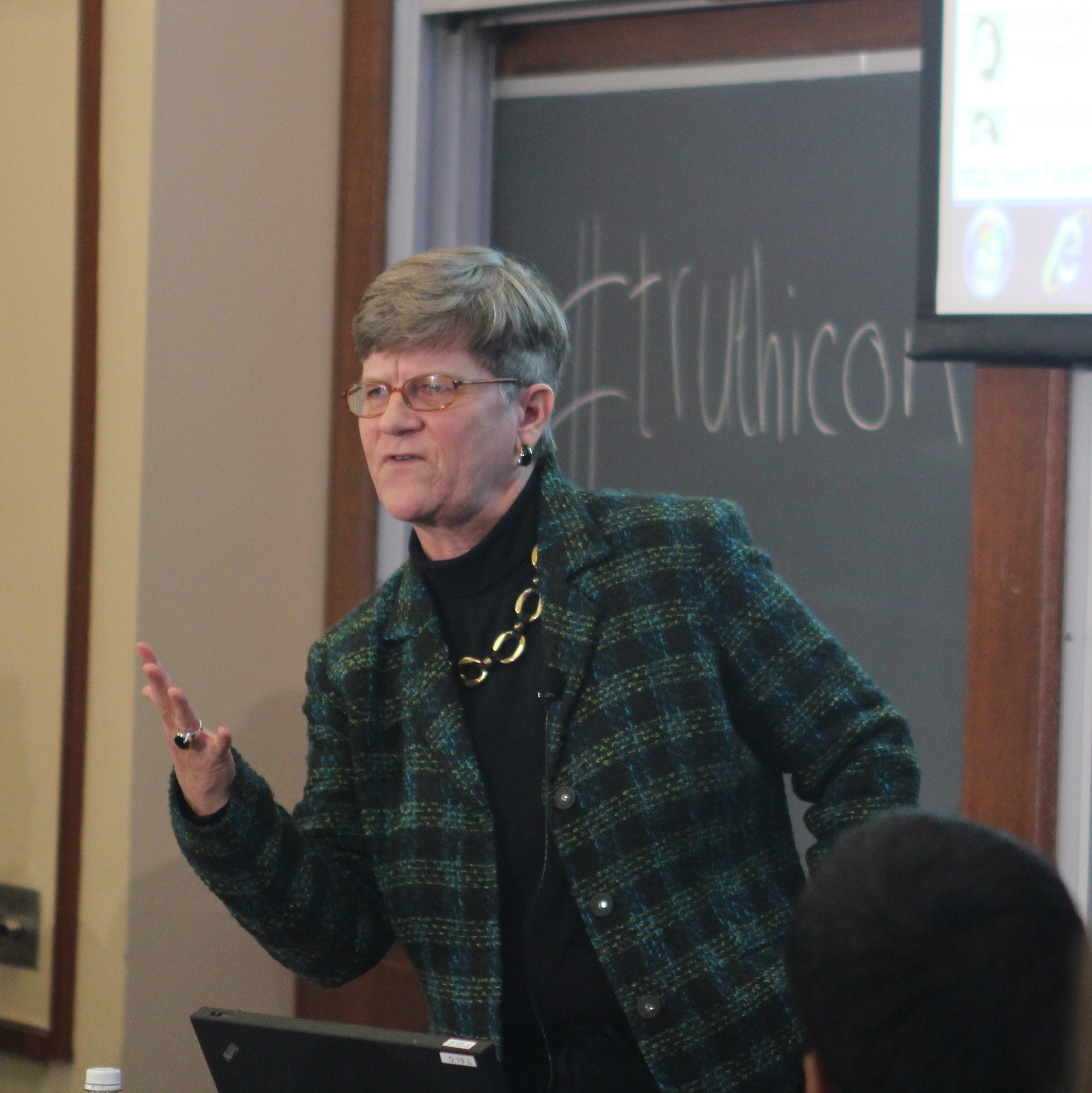
Jamieson in 2010

Six of her authored or co-authored books have received book awards: Packaging the Presidency (NCA Golden Anniversary Book Award); Eloquence in an Electronic Age (NCA James A. Winans-Herbert A. Wichelns Memorial Award); Spiral of Cynicism: The Press and the Public Good, with Joseph Cappella (Doris Graber Book Award of the American Political Science, ICA Fellows Book Award); Presidents Creating the Presidency, with Karlyn Kohrs Campbell (NCA James A. Winans-Herbert A. Wichelns Memorial Award, NCA Diamond Anniversary Book Award); and The Obama Victory: How Media, Money and Message Shaped the 2008 Election, with Kate Kenski and Bruce Hardy (American Publishers Association PROSE Award, ICA Outstanding Book Award, Rod Hart Outstanding Book Award, NCA Diamond Anniversary Book Award). Jamieson also received the Henry Allen Moe prize from the American Philosophical Society in 2016 for her paper "Implications of the Demise of 'Fact' in Political Discourse." Cyberwar: How Russian Hackers and Trolls Helped Elect a President won the 2019 R. R. Hawkins Award from the Association of American Publishers, and was a Book of the Year in The Times Literary Supplement.

Jamieson has won teaching awards at each of three universities with which she has been affiliated.

== Contributions ==
=== Dirty Politics (1992) ===
In this book, Jamieson provides her readers with a new way to interpret political campaigns in an attempt to uncover the truth. She analyzes the various advertising techniques used by candidates, attempting to show themselves in a more positive light than their opponents. Jamieson also provides her readers with many advertising strategies. For example, she explains that many advertisements attempt to impersonate the news, hoping to gain legitimacy.

=== Packaging the Presidency (1996) ===
Covering the media campaigns of America's first presidents to Bill Clinton's 1992 campaign, Jamieson looks at the importance of political advertising. In her book, she writes that, "If political advertising did not exist, we would have to invent it." She argues that, although campaigns can be somewhat sleazy and vague, political advertising is a necessity in America, because it reminds voters that they really do have a say in their government.

=== The Spiral of Cynicism (1997) ===
Together with Joseph N. Cappella, Jamieson looks at voter turnout and what causes certain people to vote. From their findings, Jamieson and Cappella pioneered the idea that the manner in which the media presents politics leads to some people to choose to not vote. They argue that the media should be focusing on substance, but instead displays politics as more of a game. This, in turn, creates the "spiral of cynicism" that leads to the decline of interest and participation in elections.

=== Deeds Done in Words (1990) / Presidents Creating the Presidency (2008) ===
In these co-written works with Karlyn Kohrs Campbell, Campbell and Jamieson create a monumental framework for analyzing the rhetoric surrounding presidential oratory. They argue that the presidency is defined by what the president says and how they say it. Through the framework that Campbell and Jamieson create, they describe the different situations and actions in which presidents operate, such as inaugural addresses, special inaugural addresses in the ascension of a vice president, national eulogies, pardoning rhetoric, state of the union addresses, veto messages, the signing statement as the de facto item veto, presidential war rhetoric, presidential rhetoric of self-defense, and the rhetoric of impeachment. This work covers all the presidents up to George W. Bush.

Campbell and Jamieson argue that presidential discourse has had multiple demands of audience, occasion, and institution and in the process of either satisfying or failing, political capital and presidential authority is either supplemented from or depleted to the other branches of government. The original work of Deeds Done in Words: Presidential Rhetoric and Genre of Governance was updated to address new developments such as the ever-evolving rhetorical strategies and technological advancements in media.

=== Cyberwar (2018) ===
In Cyberwar, Jamieson applies years of research on elections to the problem of Russian interference in the 2016 United States elections. She concludes that it is highly probable, but not certain, that the Russians turned the election away from Hillary Clinton to Trump.

== Works ==
- Debating Crime Control coauthored with Hugo Hellman and William Semlak (Marquette Publishing, 1967)
- The Interplay of Influence: Media and Their Publics in News, Advertising and Politics coauthored with Karlyn Kohrs Campbell (Wadsworth, 1983)
- Packaging the Presidency (Oxford, 1984)
- Eloquence in an Electronic Age (Oxford, 1988)
- Presidential Debates: The Challenge of Creating an Informed Electorate coauthored with David Birdsell (Oxford, 1988)
- Deeds Done in Words: Presidential Rhetoric and The Genres of Governance coauthored with Karlyn Kohrs Campbell (University of Chicago, 1990)
- Dirty Politics: Deception, Distraction and Democracy (Oxford, 1992)
- Beyond the Double Bind: Women and Leadership (Oxford, 1995)
- Spiral of Cynicism: Press and Public Good coauthored with Joseph N. Cappella (Oxford, 1997)
- Everything You Think You Know About Politics... and Why You're Wrong (Basic Books, 2000)
- The Press Effect: Politicians, Journalists and the Stories that Shape the Political World coauthored with Paul Waldman (Oxford, 2003)
- Capturing Campaign Dynamics: The National Annenberg Election Survey: Design, Method and Data coauthored with Dan Romer, Kate Kenski, Paul Waldman, and Christopher Adasiewicz (Oxford, 2003)
- The 2000 Presidential Election and the Foundations Of Party Politics coauthored with Richard Johnston and Michael Hagen (Cambridge, 2004)
- Capturing Campaign Dynamics 2000 & 2004: The National Annenberg Election Survey coauthored with Dan Romer, Kate Kenski, Ken Winneg, and Christopher Adasiewicz (University of Pennsylvania, 2006)
- unSpun: Finding Facts in a World of Disinformation coauthored with Brooks Jackson (Random House, 2007)
- Echo Chamber: Rush Limbaugh and the Conservative Media Establishment, coauthored with Joseph N. Cappella (Oxford, 2008)
- Presidents Creating the Presidency: Deeds Done in Words coauthored with Karlyn Kohrs Campbell (University of Chicago, 2008)
- The Obama Victory: How Media, Money, and Messages Shaped the 2008 Election coauthored with Kate Kenski and Bruce W. Hardy (Oxford, 2010)
- Cyberwar: How Russian Hackers and Trolls Helped Elect a President; What We Don't, Can't, and Do Know (Oxford, 2018) ISBN 978-0190915810

== See also ==
- Cyberwarfare by Russia
- Timeline of Russian interference in the 2016 United States elections and Timeline of Russian interference in the 2016 United States elections (July 2016 – election day), for lead-up to the 2016 election
