= Cesar Maia =

Brazilian politician

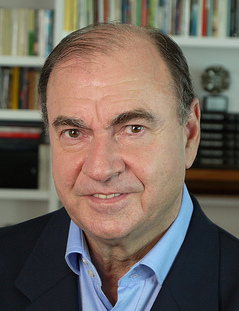

Councillor of Rio de Janeiro
- Incumbent
- Assumed office January 1, 2013
- Constituency: At-large

Mayor of Rio de Janeiro
- In office January 1, 2001 – January 1, 2009
- Vice Mayor: Marco Antônio Valles (2001–2005); Otávio Leite (2005–2009)
- Preceded by: Luiz Paulo Conde
- Succeeded by: Eduardo Paes
- In office January 1, 1993 – January 1, 1997
- Vice Mayor: Gilberto Ramos
- Preceded by: Marcello Alencar
- Succeeded by: Luiz Paulo Conde

Federal Deputy
- In office February 1, 1987 – December 31, 1992
- Constituency: Rio de Janeiro

Personal details
- Born: June 18, 1945 (age 81) Rio de Janeiro, Federal District, Brazil
- Party: PSD (since 2024)
- Other political affiliations: PCB (1974–1981); PDT (1981–1991); PMDB (1991–1996); PFL (1996–1999); PTB (1999–2004); DEM (2004–2022); PSDB (2022–2024)
- Spouse: Mariangeles Ibarra (m. 1969; died 2025)
- Children: 2, including Rodrigo
- Parents: Felinto Epitácio Maia (father); Dalila Ribeiro de Almeida Maia (mother)
- Relatives: José Agripino Maia (cousin)
- Profession: Economist, politician

Cesar Epitácio Maia (born June 18, 1945) is a Brazilian politician, notable for having been elected three times for mayor of Rio de Janeiro.

A native of Rio, born in 1945, Maia was forced to leave Brazil in exile during the 1960s on account of his affiliation with the Brazilian Communist Party. Exiled in Chile, he obtained a degree in economics, but the 1973 coup in the country saw him return to his native land. After becoming Professor of Macroeconomics at the Fluminense Federal University in the neighbouring city of Niterói, Maia became active in the Democratic Labour Party (PDT), founded by Leonel Brizola. Maia supported Brizola's campaign to become Governor of Rio de Janeiro state in 1983, as Brazil was emerging from the military-led regime towards full democracy, and was subsequently appointed Treasury Secretary for the state.

A trusted personal adviser to Brizola, who was instrumental in uncovering and denouncing the allegedly electoral fraud that threatened Brizola's gubernatorial election in 1982, the so-called Proconsult scheme, Maia was to be elected to the national Chamber of Deputies in 1986, and saw re-election in 1990. Meanwhile, having achieved personal political prominence in the late 1980s, Maia broke with Brizola and the PDT, affiliating with the Party of the Brazilian Democratic Movement (PMDB) in 1991, being elected mayor of the city of Rio de Janeiro for the first time in 1992, defeating the Workers' Party candidate, Afro-Brazilian Benedita da Silva in a run-off election, in a campaign that was regarded by some as being driven by racist ideology. Maia subsequently left the PMDB and joined the Liberal Front Party (PFL).

== Mayoral career ==
Maia began his first term as mayor in the wake of an episode that mirrored the strained relationship between the social classes in Rio de Janeiro, the so-called arrastão (looting-rampage, or "dragnet") on October the 18th, which saw rival groups of youths from different shanty towns (galeras) and associated with various funk bands (funkeiros) sorting out their differences and going on a looting-spree at Ipanema beach. Maia ran as a law and order candidate, and after his inauguration tried a "no-nonsense" attitude, focused on new directions on public administration and urban intervention. He frequently courted media attention through the use of so-called factoids; small antics that went from the eccentric to the ridiculous, for example his proposed special monetary unit, legal tender only in Rio de Janeiro. Given the bizarre character of some of these antics, some say that Maia from the start "wanted to build an image purposely intended to appear as surprising as well as strange".

In his first term, Maia focused on projects such as "Rio Cidade", an urban renewal initiative targeting the city's commercial districts. The renewal would involve sidewalk repair and replacements, urban furnishings, street lights, landscaping, as well as aesthetic redesigning of each neighbourhood to give each its own specific visual identity. Rio-Cidade, however, was from the outset criticised perceived poor architectural choices, such as a giant cast iron obelisk built in Ipanema, together with an elevated causeway across a street that never opened to the public and was eventually razed in 2009 at the locals' behest. Rio-Cidade intended to provide infrastructure for the expansion of cable TV networks in wealthy districts. Other programs included the construction of a major urban highway called Linha Amarela, as well as the most important urbanization project in the favelas as recognized by UNESCO, Favela-Bairro, a project started with a credit of 180 million US$ from the Inter-American Development Bank.

Favela-Bairro was a programme concerned mostly with providing basic utilities and public services (sewage systems, sidewalks, etc.) to a number of existing shanty towns, while renovating housing and its surroundings in aesthetical terms, as in Rio-Cidade. Favela-Bairro, however, as much as it was presented as a plan for drastic improvement of actual living conditions, was seen as having failed in one of its chief concerns, that of blurring the boundaries between the "formal" city and the shantytown: in the words of scholar Janice Perlman, "there's still no doubt about where the asfalto ends and the morro begins". At the same time, by stating that favela residents could have access to proper urbanism if they behaved in an "orderly" fashion, Favela-Bairro perpetuated the stigma long associated to shantytown dwellers. Finally, Favela-Bairro was also seem as very limited in scope, as it concerned itself with only 27% of all Rio shanty-towns.

After his first mayoral term, which was succeeded by one of his associates, architect Luiz Paulo Conde, Maia chose to distance himself from the legacy of Favela Bairro, and the programme came to be fostered by Conde, who had meanwhile distanced himself from Maia. In the end, Favela Bairro achieved what was called by some as "anecdotal success at best". Similar criticism met many of Maia's other projects, as in the case of Linha Amarela, an express highway that displaced some 10,000 people to foster private automobile traffic between the Barra da Tijuca district and downtown Rio.

Reelected in 2000 in a runoff election against his former protégé Conde - for which he had meanwhile joined the Brazilian Labour Party - Maia embarked on a project to set a branch of the Guggenheim Museum on the Rio waterfront, a US$200 million project - in partnership with Guggenheim director Thomas Krens - which included a building designed by French architect Jean Nouvel and whose cost would be borne entirely by the city in return for the prestige associated with the Guggenheim brand. The scheme was eventually shelved as a court decision declared the contract between the Rio City Hall and the Guggenheim Foundation to be against Brazilian law, the project being described as "a piece of hubris and folly worthy of Maia's Roman namesake". In his second term, however, Maia embarked in various building schemes, such as Cidade do Samba (Samba City) a complex of workshops in Rio's docking district to be used by samba schools to prepare for Carnival parades, inaugurated in 2005 - and was partially destroyed by a fire on 7 February 2011; the Luiz Gonzaga Center for Northeastern Traditions, an old pavilion in downtown Rio long used for selling Northeastern traditional foods and wares, refurbished to function both as a market and a showhouse - in what was seem as a "commodification" of traditional culture.

Easily reelected in 2004, this time again on the Democratas party ticket, Maia embarked in a whole gamut of public works linked to the successful Rio candidature for hosting the 2007 Pan American Games, including many works that were hotly contested as authoritarian, environmentally unfriendly, and in collusion with private building interests, such as the proposed works for the Gloria Marina, which included the construction of a huge garage for yachts - as well as a shopping mall - in the landmark protected Aterro do Flamengo area, works which were shelved after being questioned by a public attorney. Works actually concluded, such as the Maria Lenk Aquatic Center, the Estádio Olímpico João Havelange and others, were regarded by many as simply an embarrassing legacy of "white elephants" - a Brazilian idiom for costly, only-for-show works and without any actual counterpart in urban infrastructure - a result reached after cost overruns that were actually six to ten times the original US$177 million budget. As he finished his term of office in early 2009, Maia also left a legacy of an unfinished and huge (1 million square feet) concert hall in Barra da Tijuca, the Cidade da Música (City of Music), designed by French architect Christian de Portzamparc, that had cost some US$220 million and was left unused after it was declared as unsafe by the State's Fire Brigade. Finishing work on the City of Music premises continues, with actual inauguration lastly being set tentatively in July 2010, at a grand total cost of R$481.3 million (US$818.2 million); although most of the future activities are to be conceded to private contractors, it's forecast that the complex's operations will generate public spending in the order of R$247 million (US$420 million) for the next twenty-five years.

During Maia's third term, management of the city's public hospitals was deemed as so poor that in March 2005 the federal Ministry of Health decreed an intervention in health facilities jointly administered by the federal government and the city, two military field hospitals being set in order to deal with the ongoing jam. In early 2008, a dengue fever epidemic hit Rio, taking 54 lives at the three first months of the year, despite Maia's declaring it to be a purely local occurrence at the same time charging the Minister of Health of "criminal neglect" for supposedly having failed to forewarn Rio of the coming disease outbreak. In late March 2008, Maia traveled to Salvador and declared that he had "prayed to the Senhor do Bonfim to blow away the Rio mosquitos to the sea" and that he had travelled to Bahia "in order to bring Rio the strong spiritual vibes we have here".

Also in early 2008, Maia had to face a citizens' boycott on the property tax on real state assets (IPTU).

== 2008 and 2010 Political setbacks ==
The poor evaluation of his third term eventually made Maia unable to exert a meaningful influence in the 2008 mayoral elections, in which his party's candidate, Maia's Secretary of Housing Solange Amaral fared a poor sixth in the elections' first round, with 3.92% of the valid ballots. In 2010 Maia ran for the Senate and, in the race for two senatorial seats, came fourth, with 11% of the State's voting, in what was described as the worst defeat of his whole career.

== See also ==
- List of Mayors of Rio de Janeiro
- Favela: Four Decades of Living on the Edge in Rio de Janeiro

Political offices
Preceded by Marcello Alencar	Mayor of Rio de Janeiro; 1993–1997; 2001–2009	Succeeded by Luiz Paulo Conde
Preceded by Luiz Paulo Conde	Mayor of Rio de Janeiro; 1993–1997; 2001–2009	Succeeded by Eduardo Paes
