= Luiz Paulo Conde =

Brazilian architect and politician (1934–2015)

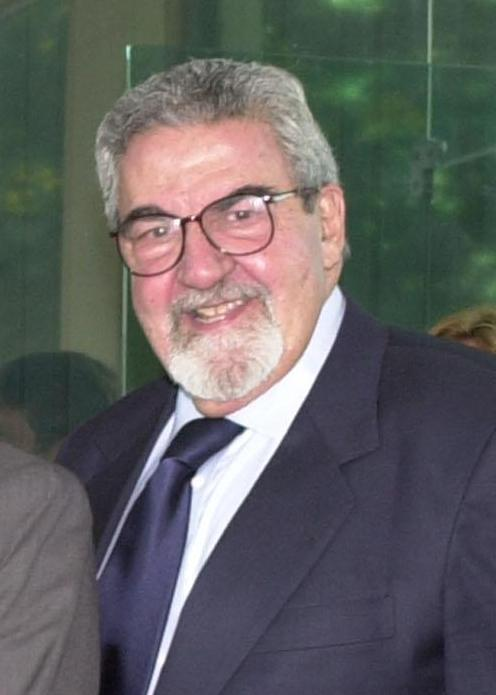

Vice Governor of Rio de Janeiro
- In office 1 January 2003 – 1 January 2007
- Governor: Rosinha Garotinho
- Preceded by: Benedita da Silva
- Succeeded by: Luiz Fernando Pezão

Mayor of Rio de Janeiro
- In office 1 January 1997 – 1 January 2001
- Vice Mayor: Eider Dantas (1997–1998); None (1998–2001)
- Preceded by: Cesar Maia
- Succeeded by: Cesar Maia

Personal details
- Born: Luiz Paulo Fernández Conde; 6 August 1934 Rio de Janeiro, Brazil
- Died: 21 July 2015 (aged 80) Rio de Janeiro, Brazil
- Party: PFL (1985–2001); PSB (2001–2003); PMDB (2003–2015)
- Spouse: Eliza Rizzo (m. 1959)
- Children: 3
- Relatives: Oscar Lorenzo Fernández (uncle)
- Education: University of Brazil (B.Arch.)
- Profession: Architect

Luiz Paulo Fernández Conde (6 August 1934 – 21 July 2015) was a Brazilian architect and politician. He was Mayor of Rio de Janeiro from 1997 to 2001 and Vice Governor from 2003 to 2007.

== Biography ==
Fourth son of Jose Ramon Conde Rivas, Spanish entrepreneur and industrial and Amália Lorenzo Fernández, lyric singer and musician from Spanish ancestry. Conde was also nephew of composer Oscar Lorenzo Fernández. During his childhood, he attended Lafayette and Mello e Souza High Schools. He married in 1959 with his college friend Eliza Rizzo, architect and plastic artist, with whom he had three children: Marcelo, Marcos and Maria Eliza.

== Architecture career ==
Graduated in 1959 at the National Architecture School of the University of Brazil (current Federal University of Rio de Janeiro) and worked in the project development of the Rio Museum of Modern Art (MAM), as collaborator of Affonso Eduardo Reidy.

Conde was a judge, as an invitation of the French government, of the contest for the latest museum of Paris, Musée du quai Branly. He judge works from Christian de Portzamparc, Norman Foster, Peter Eisenman and Jean Nouvel.

His architectural work was described and tributed in the book "Luiz Paulo Conde: Um Arquiteto Carioca", released in 1994 in the Quito Panamerican Biennial.

== Political career ==
Conde assumed offices as Municipal Secretary of Urbanism in the first tenure of Cesar Maia (1993–1997), State Secretary of Government Articulation during the administration of Anthony Garotinho (1999–2002), State Secretary of Environment and Urban Development of Governor Rosinha Garotinho (2003–2007) and State Secretary of Culture of Sérgio Cabral. He was also president of Furnas from August 2007 to September 2008.

== Death ==
Conde was admitted at Samaritano Hospital, in Botafogo, South Side Rio de Janeiro, for almost a year, for the treatment of a prostate cancer. On late night of 21 July 2015, around 3:00 a.m. (BRT), Luiz Paulo Conde was declared dead at the age of 80. His body was buried on São João Batista Cemitery.

Political offices
Preceded by Cesar Maia	Mayor of Rio de Janeiro; 1997–2001	Succeeded by Cesar Maia
Vacant Title last held by Benedita da Silva	Vice Governor of Rio de Janeiro; 2003–2007	Succeeded by Luiz Fernando Pezão
