= Trygve Tollefsbol =

Professor at the University of Alabama at Birmingham

Trygve Tollefsbol is a Distinguished Professor at the University of Alabama at Birmingham (UAB) in the department of Biology. Coining the term “epigenetics diet” in 2011, Tollefsbol has been a leader in the field of phytochemical-based epigenetic mechanisms to prevent cancer. In his role as founder and chief editor for Elsevier's Translational Epigenetics, an internationally recognized series, he has directed the publication of almost 50 books on the topic of epigenetics.

== Career ==
Tollefsbol's edited and co-authored textbook, Handbook of Epigenetics, is one of the standards in the field and is in the third edition. He has 20 books either published or in press on topics such as epigenetics, aging, cancer and telomerase as editor and co-author and his book, Medical Epigenetics, was awarded by the Association of American Publishers Award for Professional and Scholarly Excellence (PROSE Award).

Tollefsbol has contributed chapters on epigenetics in Lewin's Genes, one of the leading and most well-known international textbooks in molecular biology and has published over 200 scientific articles. The focus of his early research involved mechanisms of DNA methylation in aging and he was among the pioneers advocating the importance of epigenetic processes such as DNA methylation in aging cells.

He graduated cum laude with a Bachelor of Science from the University of Houston and obtained a Master of Science, Doctor of Osteopathic Medicine, and Doctor of Philosophy from the University of North Texas Health Sciences Center and completed his postdoctoral studies at Duke University and the University of North Carolina.

Tollefsbol joined the faculty at UAB in 1998 where he is a Distinguished Professor of Biology and a senior scientist in the O’Neal Comprehensive Cancer Center, Integrative Center for Aging Research, Nutrition Obesity Research Center, Comprehensive Diabetes Center, and the University Wide Microbiome Center. He founded and directed the UAB Cell Senescence Culture Facility for more than 20 years, a service that facilitated the research of numerous investigators both at UAB and nationally.

Tollefsbol received an unsolicited grant award from the Glenn Foundation for Medical Research for his research on the mechanisms of biological aging and served for many years as Associate Editor of Frontiers in Genetics, a leading international journal in his area, and was awarded Outstanding Associate Editor in 2021. He has served as chair and/or panel member for grant Study Sections for the NIH Center for Scientific Review on multiple occasions. Tollefsbol married fellow scientist Lucy G. Andrews in 1990 who collaborated with him on many of his studies.

He received the Ireland Award for Scholarly Distinction at UAB in 2015.
