= The Ancient Greek Roots of Human Rights =

2021 book by Rachel Hall Sternberg

- Cover
- Author: Rachel Hall Sternberg
- Language: English
- Subject: Human rights, Ancient Greece, Enlightenment philosophy
- Genre: Non-fiction, History
- Publisher: University of Texas Press
- Publication date: July 13, 2021
- Publication place: United States
- Media type: Print
- Pages: 184
- Awards: Finalist for 2022 PROSE Award in Classics
- ISBN: 9781477322918

The Ancient Greek Roots of Human Rights is a 2021 book by American historian and classical scholar Rachel Hall Sternberg. The book investigates the intellectual and cultural foundations of humane values, tracing their origins to Classical Athens and examining their later evolution in 18th-century Europe. By analyzing literary and historical texts from thinkers and philosophers such as Thucydides, Xenophon, and Voltaire, Sternberg argues that precursors to modern human rights can be found in the ancient articulation of empathy and human dignity. The work merges the history of ideas with cultural history, highlighting the parallel influences of war, reason, and emotion in shaping humane discourse across time. The book was a finalist for the 2022 PROSE Award in Classics.

== Background ==
Sternberg, Full Professor of Classics and an Associate Professor of history at Case Western Reserve University. The book stems from her research into the social history of Classical Athens, particularly the concept of Greek pity or compassion, which she has studied since her 1998 doctoral dissertation at Bryn Mawr College. Her thesis was titled "Pity and Pragmatism: A Study of Athenian Attitudes toward Compassion in Fifth and Fourth Century Historiography and Oratory," and she worked at it under the supervision and support of T.C. Brennan and R. Hamilton. The 2021 book aims to explore the connection between ancient Greek thought and the emergence of human rights ideas in 18th-century European Enlightenment thought.

In the preface, Sternberg emphasizes her background as a classical scholar while acknowledging that she is less familiar with primary sources from the Enlightenment period, relying instead on historians and contemporary philosophers such as Martha Nussbaum and Michael Rosen. Sternberg also highlighted the "affective turn" in the humanities, which has allowed for a greater integration of emotions into historical explanations.

Sternberg said that the Greeks were touched by many literary genres including the ones that they had invented or helped invented. The author said that virtually nowadays "everyone has something Greek in their heritage." She compared the culture shift of the 18th century to what was happening in the culture of Ancient Greece. In a 2022 interview about the book, Sternberg said:

My observation about the development of compassion as value was similar to what happened in the 18th century, and I just wanted to see what would happen if I compare those two periods from that point of view. To my astonishment, no one seemed to have done this. So I played with it for a long time, with no agenda, I wasn't trying to write a book about human rights, it really had not crossed my mind, I was just trying to figure out how these two eras resembled one another and what was the consequence of that. And the more I started learning new things and connecting the dots, I started to get this view of the similarities that really did add up to something.

== Summary ==
Sternberg examines the cultural and intellectual underpinnings of humane values in Classical Athens and how these ideas influenced the development of human rights in 18th-century Europe. Sternberg explores the shared historical experiences that shaped both societies, such as the trauma of war and the appeal to reason, while noting that both ancient Greeks and Enlightenment thinkers often failed to live up to these values.

The book is divided into two main parts. The first section, Parallel Waves, discusses the commonalities between the two periods, with chapters focusing on themes such as reason, warfare, empathy, and the development of humane discourse. The second section, Ancient Greek Roots, delves deeper into the specific elements and paths that laid the groundwork for the eventual rise of human rights concepts. Sternberg draws on the works of ancient historians like Thucydides and Xenophon, as well as literary and philosophical texts from Greek tragic drama to Voltaire's Candide, to trace the emergence of empathy and human dignity as central moral ideas.

Sternberg argues that the ancient Greeks articulated emotional responses like empathy, which served as precursors to modern human rights. However, she also points out the tension between these ideals and the realities of their societies, both in ancient Greece and 18th-century Europe. The book concludes by offering a new perspective on the ancient Greek contributions to the concept of human rights, balancing historical research with a broader cultural analysis.

== Reviews ==
American classical historian Susan O. Shapiro thought the book is an ambitious attempt to connect classical Greek literature to the later development of human rights discourse. Shapiro highlighted Sternberg’s argument that Greek literary works, particularly from Athens, played a significant role in articulating key human rights principles such as individuality, dignity, freedom, and compassion. However, Shapiro also critiqued Sternberg for limiting the origins of these ideas to fifth- and fourth-century Athens, calling it "arbitrary and restrictive," and noted that Sternberg overlooked contributions from earlier or non-Athenian sources. Despite these limitations, Shapiro concluded that the book "raises further questions and opens up new areas of research," making it a valuable contribution to ongoing discussions about the evolution of human rights.

American classicist Matt Simonton appreciated the book's effort to draw parallels between ancient Greece and modern human rights discourse, but he pointed out some shortcomings. Simonton noted the argument's "numerous errors and insufficient argumentation," and criticized the author for relying heavily on private communications and introducing ideas that are not fully explored. Simonton acknowledged that the book "adduces striking parallels between ancient and modern thought" and suggests promising future avenues of research.
