= Antônio Pitanga =

Brazilian actor (born 1939)

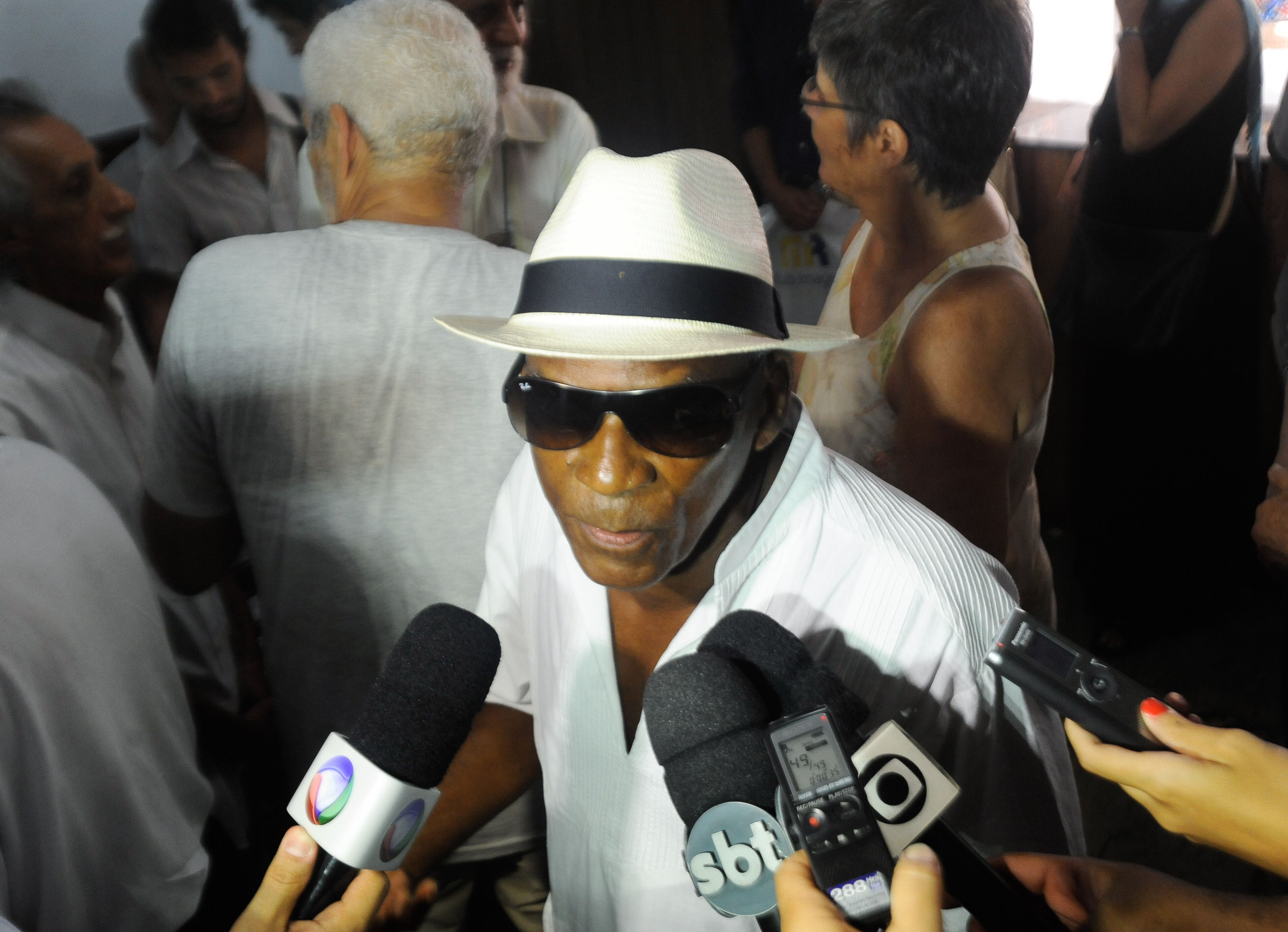
- Born: Antônio Luiz Sampaio; June 13, 1939 (age 87); Salvador, Bahia, Brazil
- Occupation: Actor
- Years active: 1960–present
- Spouses: Vera Manhães (m. 1976; div. 1986) Benedita da Silva (m. 1992)
- Children: Camila Pitanga (b. 1977); Rocco Pitanga (b. 1980)

Antônio Luiz Sampaio (born June 13, 1939), better known by his stage name Antônio Pitanga, is a Brazilian actor. He became internationally known for playing several roles on films of the Cinema Novo movement in the 1960s.

== Personal life ==
He was married to actress Vera Manhães, with whom he had two children: actress Camila Pitanga and actor Rocco Pitanga. After their divorce, he married politician Benedita da Silva.

== Selected filmography ==
Films

- Barravento (1962)
- O Pagador de Promessas (1962)
- Ganga Zumba (1963)
- The Guns (1964)
- My Home Is Copacabana (1965)
- Joanna Francesa (1973)
- The Age of the Earth (1980)
- Quilombo (1984)
- La Mansión de Araucaima (1986)
- Eternamente Pagú (1988)
- Villa-Lobos: A Life of Passion (2000)
- O Homem Que Desafiou o Diabo (2007)
- Lula, The Son of Brasil (2009)
- I'd Receive the Worst News from Your Beautiful Lips (2011)
- Memory House (2020)
- Aunt Virginia (2023)

Television

- Pantanal (1990)
- A Próxima Vítima (1995)
- O Clone (2001)
- Celebridade (2003)
- The Mutants: Pathways of the Heart (2008)
- Cama de Gato (2009)
- Rebelde (2011)
- Amor Perfeito (2023)
- Vale Tudo (2025)

Honorary titles
Preceded by Rosinha Garotinho	First Gentleman of Rio de Janeiro; 2002–2003	Succeeded by Anthony Garotinho
