= Rosângela Matheus =

Brazilian politician (born 1963)

Rosângela Assed Matheus
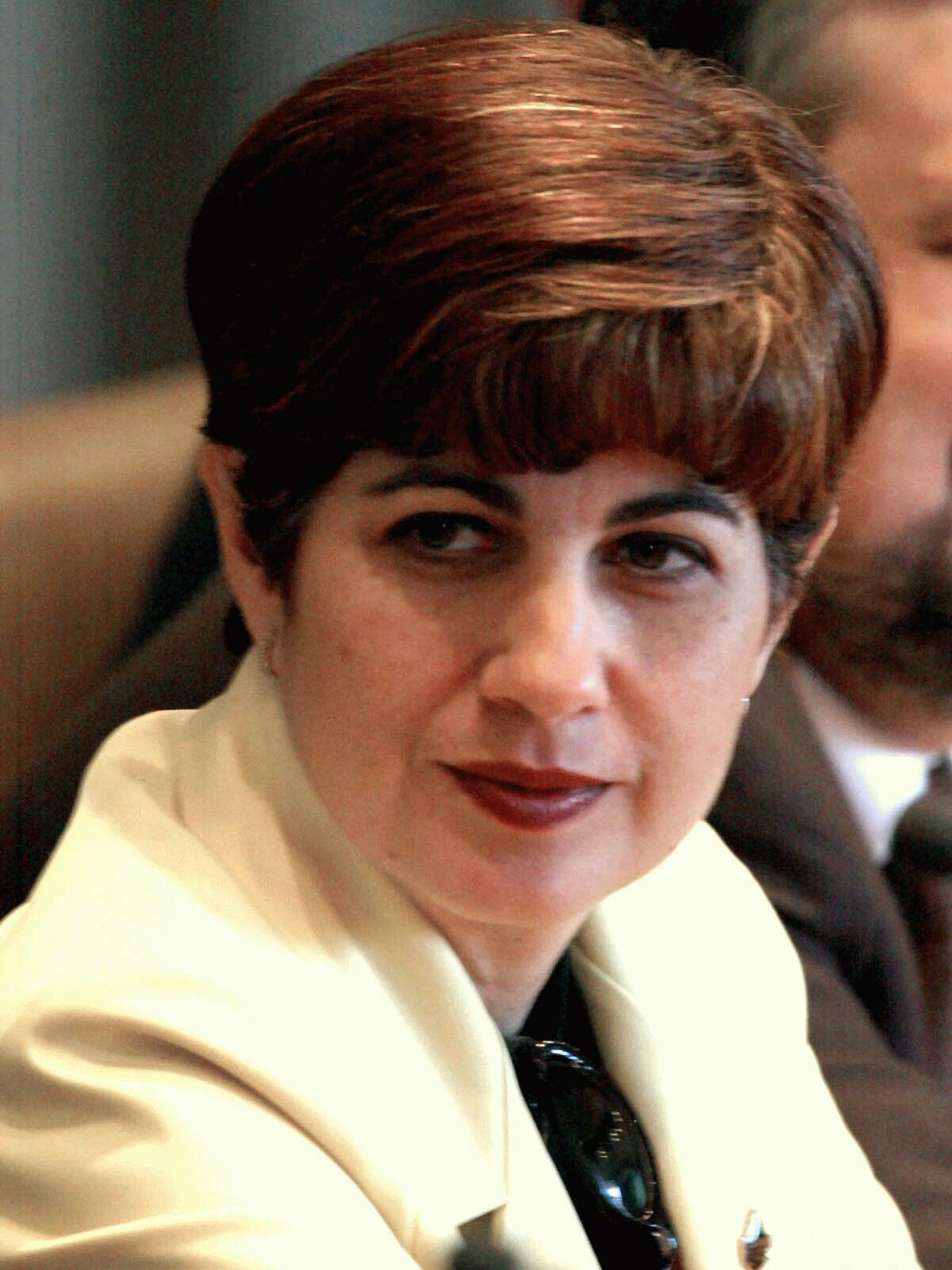

Governor of Rio de Janeiro
- In office January 1, 2003 – December 31, 2006
- Vice Governor: Luiz Paulo Conde
- Preceded by: Benedita da Silva
- Succeeded by: Sérgio Cabral Filho

Mayor of Campos dos Goytacazes
- In office January 1, 2009 – December 31, 2016
- Vice Mayor: Francisco de Souza Oliveira
- Preceded by: Roberto Henriques
- Succeeded by: Rafael Diniz

First Lady of Rio de Janeiro
- In role January 1, 1999 – April 5, 2002
- Governor: Anthony Garotinho
- Preceded by: Célia Alencar
- Succeeded by: Antônio Pitanga

Personal details
- Born: April 6, 1963 (age 63) Itaperuna, Rio de Janeiro, Brazil
- Party: Party of the Republic
- Spouse: Anthony Garotinho

Rosângela Barros Assed Matheus de Oliveira, better known simply as Rosinha Garotinho (born April 6, 1963) is a Brazilian politician.

She was the first woman to be elected governor of the state of Rio de Janeiro, and the second female governor after Benedita da Silva. She was elected in 2002, and succeeded da Silva—who was previously deputy to her husband Anthony Garotinho and had taken office when he resigned to run for president. Rosinha, who had also been secretary of Social Services under him, adopted the stage name Garotinho (originally a nickname he took while working as a radio broadcaster) to have her image associated with that of the husband.

== Early life ==
Rosinha was born in Itaperuna, Rio de Janeiro state, daughter of Gandur Assed and Wilmar Barros Assed. She has lived in Campos dos Goytacazes since she was four. Until the age of 26, she performed in amateur theater, where she met Anthony Garotinho. They married in 1981, and have four children: Clarissa, Wladimir, Anthony, and Clara. They also adopted other five children: Aparecida, Altamir, Amanda, Wanderson, and David.

She taught at the Colégio Batista Fluminense and also worked as a broadcaster in Campos, for Continental, Culture and Littoral FM stations, as well as at Tupi and O Dia radio stations in Rio de Janeiro.

During her husband's tenure she was the State Secretary of Social Action and Citizenship.

== Rio de Janeiro Governor ==
Rosinha was elected governor on the PSB ticket after a fierce competition with the Workers Party, which until 2002 was part of the State's government in an alliance between Brizola's PDT. The Workers' Party was the party of the vice-governor Benedita da Silva, who had taken office after Garotinho's bid for the presidency, and decided to run on his own ticket for the 2002 elections.

An enthusiastic convert to evangelism - as opposed to Benedita, also a Protestant, but not an outspoken one - Rosinha was charged by the Workers' Party with populism and anti-secularism. In a pamphlet distributed at the time, she and her husband were charged with "manipulating simple people's faith, mixing religion and politics in a dangerous salad" in a "messianic and mistaken attitude". In the ensuing elections, Rosinha won at the first run, defeating Benedita by a difference of 280,000 votes.

During her gubernatorial tenure, although belonging to a nominally Left party, Rosinha nevertheless assumed the usual morally conservative stances proper to evangelical politics worldwide: she was the first prominent Brazilian politician to jump into the creationist bandwagon, by taking advantage of a State law (State Law 3495/2000, enacted by her husband) that stated that the public educational system was to offer religion classes on a confessional basis - i.e., that public schools were to pay teachers of religion chosen by different confessions' caucuses (namely Catholics, evangelicals and all others)

She was also accused of an aggressive stance towards Afro-Brazilian religions, typical of Brazilian Pentecostalism in general, as well as anti-gay bigotry: during her tenure, Rosinha followed her husband in blocking and vetoing any legislative initiative granting members of same-sex unions involving state public servants to receive pensions for their deceased partners. She also supported a bill presented at the State Legislature by an evangelical representative offering homosexuals free treatment for "healing" their homosexuality.

Rosinha also introduced an affirmative action programme in the State's public universities'(UERJ and UENF)enrollment of students. This legislation enforced admission quotas for African-Brazilians and Native Brazilians, as well as former students of public highschools and handicapped people.

== Electoral scandals; Mayor of Campos ==
In 2005, a local electoral court suspended Rosinha's political rights for three years, on the grounds of abuse of economic and political power, misuse of public structure and staff, and distributing money without proven legal source during the 2004 municipal elections. The court found that she and her husband had interfered heavily to keep their local power-base in Campos, by supporting the election of Geraldo Pudim.

Along with her husband and Pudim, Rosinha was found guilty of, according to the sentence, distributing social help at random, including houses sold by the government at the symbolic 1R$ rate, offering money for votes, and distributing "school kits" (paper notebooks, briefcases, backsacks, pens and pencils, and other similar items) to students during the electoral campaign in Campos, something forbidden under Brazilian Electoral Law. The ineligibility penalty was, however, later quashed by the regional electoral court, something that allowed Pudim to present himself as candidate in the extraordinary 2006 mayoral elections, while his adversaries were found guilty on the same charges of electoral corruption and prevented from running; Pudim, was, however, defeated.

In the regular 2008 elections Rosinha was elected mayor of Campos in a run-off election, having 54.47% of the valid ballots. She was subsequently, impeached in June 2010 by the regional electoral court on charges of further electoral corruption. As her vice-mayor was also impeached, her office had to be taken over temporarily by the president of the Municipal Chamber, Rosinha's brother-in-law.

Preceded by Benedita da Silva	Governor of Rio de Janeiro; 2003–2006	Succeeded by Sérgio Cabral Filho
