= FactCheck.org =

Fact-checking website

- Available in: English
- Owner: Annenberg Public Policy Center
- Website: factcheck.org
- Commercial: No
- Launched: December 2003; 22 years ago

FactCheck.org is a nonprofit website that provides original research on misinformation and hoaxes with the stated aim of reducing "the level of deception and confusion in U.S. politics". It is a project of the Annenberg Public Policy Center of the Annenberg School for Communication at the University of Pennsylvania and is funded primarily by the Annenberg Foundation.

Kathleen Hall Jamieson's 1993 book Dirty Politics, in which she criticized the presidential campaigns of George H. W. Bush and Michael Dukakis in 1988, provided the idea for FactCheck.org. Most of its content consists of rebuttals to inaccurate, misleading, or false claims made by politicians. FactCheck.org has also targeted misinformation from various political action committees. Other features include:

- Ask FactCheck, where users can ask questions that are usually based on an online rumor.
- Viral Spiral, a page dedicated to the most popular online myths that the site has debunked. It clarifies the answer as well as links readers to a full article on the subject.
- Party Lines, talking points that have been repeatedly used by multiple members of a political party.
- Mailbag, a page publishing readers' letters, including praise or criticism of the site's content.

== History ==
FactCheck.org was launched in December 2003 by Brooks Jackson, a former Associated Press, The Wall Street Journal, and CNN reporter who had covered Washington and national politics since 1970. As a special assignment correspondent at CNN during the 1992 political campaign season, Jackson became well known for his "Ad Police" reports, which monitored candidates' advertising and financing strategies throughout the campaign.

In 2003, Kathleen Hall Jamieson of the Annenberg Public Policy Center approached Jackson about forming FactCheck.org, and the site was online in December of that year. In 2007, UnSpun was published. This book was co-written by Brooks Jackson, the director emeritus of FactCheck.org and Kathleen Hall Jamieson, the director of the Annenberg Public Policy Center. It teaches readers how to be aware of the deceptions, or "spin", that is commonly used in media and by politicians.

In January 2013, Jackson stepped down as director of FactCheck.org. He now holds the title of director emeritus. Eugene Kiely, a former reporter and editor at The Record (of Hackensack, New Jersey), The Philadelphia Inquirer and USA Today, became the site's director. FactCheck.org employed a staff of four full-time journalists in 2013, and since 2010 has offered yearly fellowships to undergraduate students at the University of Pennsylvania.

In 2025, journalist Lori Robertson became the director. She had previously served as managing editor of American Journalism Review and administrative director of the Casey Journalism Center on Children and Families.

=== 2004 vice-presidential debate ===
FactCheck.org became a focus of political commentary following the 2004 vice-presidential debate between Dick Cheney and John Edwards. Cheney cited the website, claiming that the independent site defended his actions while CEO of Halliburton. Cheney's claim was disputed by FactCheck.org as wrong, saying that "Edwards was mostly right" when talking about "Cheney's responsibility for earlier Halliburton troubles". Cheney's reference created some controversy because he incorrectly cited the website's address as "FactCheck.com." At the time of the debate, factcheck.com was controlled by Frank Schilling's company Name Administration Inc., who quickly redirected the address to point to an anti-Bush website owned by Bush critic George Soros.

=== 2012 presidential election ===
FactCheck.org also became a focus of national attention in the summer of 2012, during the presidential race between incumbent Democrat Barack Obama and GOP challenger Mitt Romney. The Obama campaign ran a TV ad accusing Romney of involvement in the outsourcing of American jobs overseas by Bain Capital, the venture capital firm that he had founded in 1984. FactCheck.org ruled this ad to be false, claiming that the acts of outsourcing occurred after Romney had left the company to head the 2002 Winter Olympics in Salt Lake City. In response, the Obama campaign contested FactCheck.org's ruling in a six-page letter that was distributed to major news corporations, holding that Romney still retained responsibility for the company's actions.

=== 2016 presidential election ===
Since November 2014, FactCheck.org has published twenty-eight pages of articles checking the facts on the many 2016 U.S. presidential election candidates. As of April 2016, the five remaining candidates had dedicated archives to their fact-checked claims. In 2016, FactCheck.org began a nine year fact-checking partnership with Facebook. The findings of the 2016 fact checking process are available publicly and were analyzed.

== Awards and recognition ==
The site has gained recognition and won numerous awards for its contributions to political journalism. In 2004, Time magazine named FactCheck.org as one of the "50 best websites 2004". In 2006, Time magazine named FactCheck.org one of the "25 Sites We Can't Live Without." In 2008, PC Magazine called it one of the "20 Best Political Websites." In 2009, the Association for Women in Communications awarded FactCheck.org the Clarion Awards. In 2010, FactCheck.org won the Delta-Chi-Price of the Society of Professional Journalists.

Between 2008 and 2012, the site won four Webby Awards in the Politics category, in 2008, 2010, 2011, and 2012; as well as four People's Voice Awards in Politics, in 2008, 2009, 2010, and 2012. FactCheck.org also won a 2010 Sigma Delta Chi Award from the Society of Professional Journalists for reporting on deceptive claims made about the federal health care legislation.

== See also ==
- List of common misconceptions
- Fact-checking – Process of verifying information in non-fictional text
- Snopes – Fact-checking website
- PolitiFact – American nonprofit fact-checking website
- The Skeptic's Dictionary – 2003 essay collection by Robert Todd Carroll
- The Straight Dope – Column published in the Chicago Reader
- Full Fact – British fact-checking organisation - UK equivalent
