= José J. de Sá Freire Alvim =

Brazilian politician

José Joachim de Sá Freire Alvim
- Photo of José Joaquim de Sá Freire Alvim

Mayor of the Federal District
- In office 1958–1960

Personal details
- Born: 1909
- Died: 1981 (aged 71–72)

José Joachim de Sá Freire Alvim (1909–1981) was a Brazilian mayor of the Distrito Federal of Rio de Janeiro from 1958 to 1960.

Political offices
Preceded by Francisco Negrão de Lima	Mayor of the Federal District; 1958–1960	District extinct
