= Cyberwar: How Russian Hackers and Trolls Helped Elect a President =

2018 book by Kathleen Hall Jamieson

- First edition
- Author: Kathleen Hall Jamieson
- Publisher: Oxford University Press
- Publication date: October 3, 2018
- Pages: 336
- ISBN: 978-0190915810

Cyberwar: How Russian Hackers and Trolls Helped Elect a President — What We Don't, Can't, and Do Know is the sixteenth book by Kathleen Hall Jamieson, published in October 2018 by Oxford University Press. The book concludes that Russia very likely delivered Trump's victory in the 2016 U.S. presidential election.

== Presuppositions ==
Jamieson begins with five premises:

1. Answering former governor Mike Huckabee, it is more likely that Russian trolls changed the election's outcome than that unicorns exist.
2. Any case for Russian influence would be based on the preponderance of the evidence, as in a legal trial, rather than advanced with certainty like e=mc^{2}.
3. Donald Trump was, at the time of publication, the duly elected president of the United States.
4. Trolls did not elect Trump, voters did.
  - Russians created protests and counterprotests reflecting on the incumbent president and his chosen successor.
  - Russians changed the course of careers (Debbie Wasserman Schultz, Donna Brazile, and James Comey)
  - Russians changed public opinion of candidate Hillary Clinton with social media, news and ads.
  - By releasing hacked materials, Russians framed the news agenda and presidential debates.
5. Whether or not the Russians swayed enough voters to decide the election, Americans need to know as much as they can about how the Russians influenced the media and the candidates' campaigns.

== Overview ==
Two chapters deal with who did it, why, and why might it matter. Chapter 2 explains that past research indicates that messaging like the Russians' is enough to be able to alter the results of a close election. Then, in five chapters, Jamieson examines the question of whether or not the Russians did what was necessary to affect the election's outcome. Three chapters deal with how the hacked content affected the last month of the campaign. Finally, Jamieson explains what we know, and what we can't know about how effective the Russians were. Regarding what we can't know, Jamieson doesn't claim to be able to identify specific U.S. citizens who changed their votes as a result of Russian interference. There is a short afterword.

== Conclusion ==
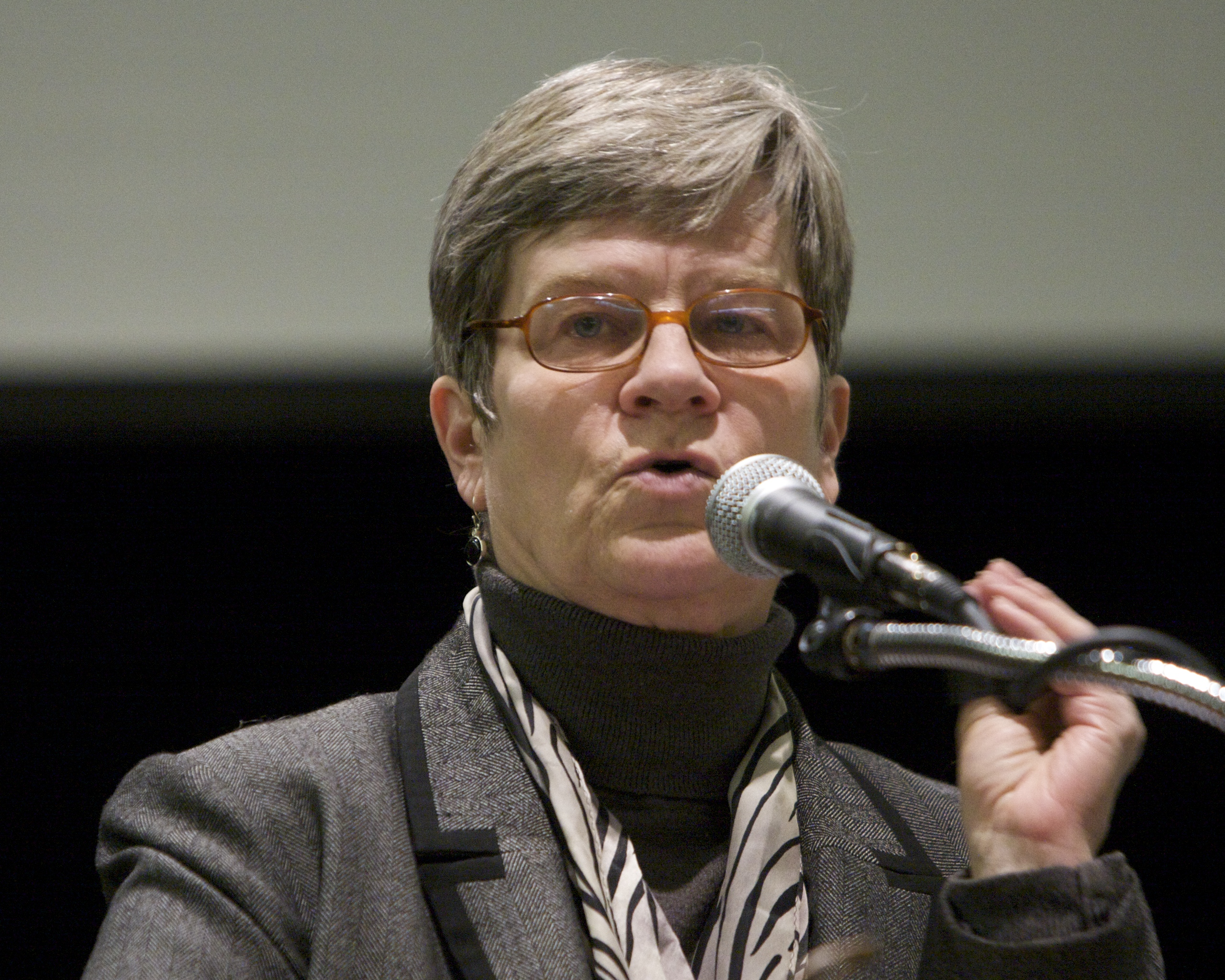
Jamieson in 2011

In a PBS Newshour interview about the book, the anchor asked Jamieson "Did Russia turn the outcome of the last presidential race?" Jamieson replied, "I believe it's highly probable that they did, not certain, but highly probable."

== Reviews and reception ==
On the whole, reviews were positive. The Guardian offered the only notable criticism; the reviewer thought that Cyberwar was a special plead excusing Clinton's loss. The Guardian did, however, agree to publish an opinion piece by Hall Jamieson. Blurbs were offered by NBC's Andrea Mitchell, Judy Woodruff of PBS, and Robert Jervis of Columbia University. Jane Mayer wrote a feature for The New Yorker based on the book. The Washington Post reported on Jamieson's criticism of the news media. Nature called Jamieson's critique of the press and its readers the book's most important. Kirkus Reviews concludes, "There's no good news in this book, which both admonishes and forewarns."

An academic review published in Public Opinion Quarterly expressed concern that Jamieson's evidence was largely circumstantial, going so far as to call the book "336 pages of mere speculation."

The book won the 2019 R.R. Hawkins Award from the Association of American Publishers, and was a Book of the Year in The Times Literary Supplement.

== See also ==
- Timeline of Russian interference in the 2016 United States elections
- Timeline of Russian interference in the 2016 United States elections (July 2016–election day)
