= Marcello Alencar =

Brazilian politician & lawyer (1925–2014)

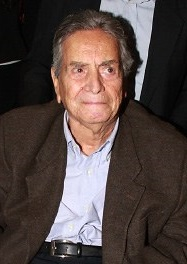

57th Governor of Rio de Janeiro
- In office January 1, 1995 – January 1, 1999
- Lieutenant: Luiz Paulo
- Preceded by: Nilo Batista
- Succeeded by: Anthony Garotinho

Mayor of Rio de Janeiro
- In office January 1, 1989 – January 1, 1993
- Preceded by: Jó Antônio Rezende
- Succeeded by: Cesar Maia
- In office December 5, 1983 – January 1, 1986
- Preceded by: Jamil Haddad
- Succeeded by: Saturnino Braga

Personal details
- Born: August 23, 1925 Rio de Janeiro, Brazil
- Died: June 10, 2014 (aged 88) Rio de Janeiro
- Party: MDB (1966–1979); PDT (1980–1993); PSDB (1993–2014)
- Profession: Lawyer

Marcello Nunes de Alencar (August 23, 1925 – June 10, 2014) was a Brazilian politician and lawyer. Alencar served as the Governor of the state of Rio de Janeiro from 1995 until 1999, as well as two tenures as Mayor of Rio de Janeiro from 1983 to 1986 and 1989 to 1993.

== Biography ==
Alencar, a lawyer, was a native of Rio de Janeiro. He defended political prisoners during the country's military dictatorship era. Affiliated with the Brazilian Democratic Movement (MDB), he was a substitute for Senator Mário de Sousa Martins for the now-defunct state of Guanabara. In 1969, with the advent of the Institutional Act Number Five, Alencar himself had his mandate revoked and his political rights suspended.

=== Mayor of Rio de Janeiro ===
He became the chairman of the Banco do Estado do Rio de Janeiro, an influential position which led to his segue into politics. Alencar joined the Democratic Labour Party, or PDT, which was led by Leonel Brizola at the time. Brizola became the Governor of Rio de Janeiro state in 1983. That same year, Governor Brizola appointed Alencar, a political ally, as the Mayor of Rio de Janeiro (The office of mayor was an appointed position during the military era, rather than an elected office). He served until January 1986, when he was succeeded by Saturnino Braga, the first elected mayor following the end of the dictatorship. Alencar ran as a candidate for the Federal Senate in 1986, but was defeated in the election.

The position of Mayor of Rio de Janeiro once again became an elected office following the end of the dictatorship in 1985. In 1988, Alencar was elected to his second term as Mayor, a position he held until 1993.

Alencar faced a number of challenges during his second term. In the interim period between 1986 and 1988, the city of Rio de Janeiro had filed for bankruptcy. Alencar oversaw a series of economic reforms and public works improvements to the city's infrastructure aimed at reviving the economy during his second term. He was a proponent of the Rio Orlo project, which saw the construction of bike paths along the Atlantic coast, as well renovated and remodeled the city's sidewalks. Alencar also instituted a series of projects which renovated hospitals, schools, streets and other public spaces. He left office in 1993.

=== Governor of Rio de Janeiro state ===
In 1993, Alencar left the PDT following a series of disputes with his former ally, Leonel Brizola, joining the Brazilian Social Democracy Party (PSDB) that same year.

Marcello Alencar declared his candidacy for Governor of Rio de Janeiro state in 1994 as a member of the PSDB. He was elected Governor in the 1994 gubernatorial election and took office on January 1, 1995. He served for one term, ending in 1999. As Governor, Alencar led the privatization of several state agencies, including the gas company, electric company, and the Banco do Estado do Rio de Janeiro. He expanded several Rio de Janeiro Metro lines to lessen the time spent commuting to work.

Alencar initiated the construction of Via Light, a new highway extending from the Pavuna neighborhood of Rio to the nearby city of Nova Iguaçu. The new Via Light was intended to ease chronic traffic congestion on an existing, older highway, Rodovia Presidente Dutra. Governor Alencar left office in 1999.

=== Later life ===
Alencar suffered a stroke in 2002. He served as the President of the Rio de Janeiro state chapter of the Brazilian Social Democracy Party (PSDB) from 1993 to 1995 and again from 2001 until 2005.

Marcello Alencar died at his home in São Conrado, Rio de Janeiro, on June 10, 2014, at the age of 88. His funeral was held at the Palácio da Cidade in Botafogo. He was buried in Cemitério do Caju.
