= Benedita da Silva =

Brazilian politician (born 1942)

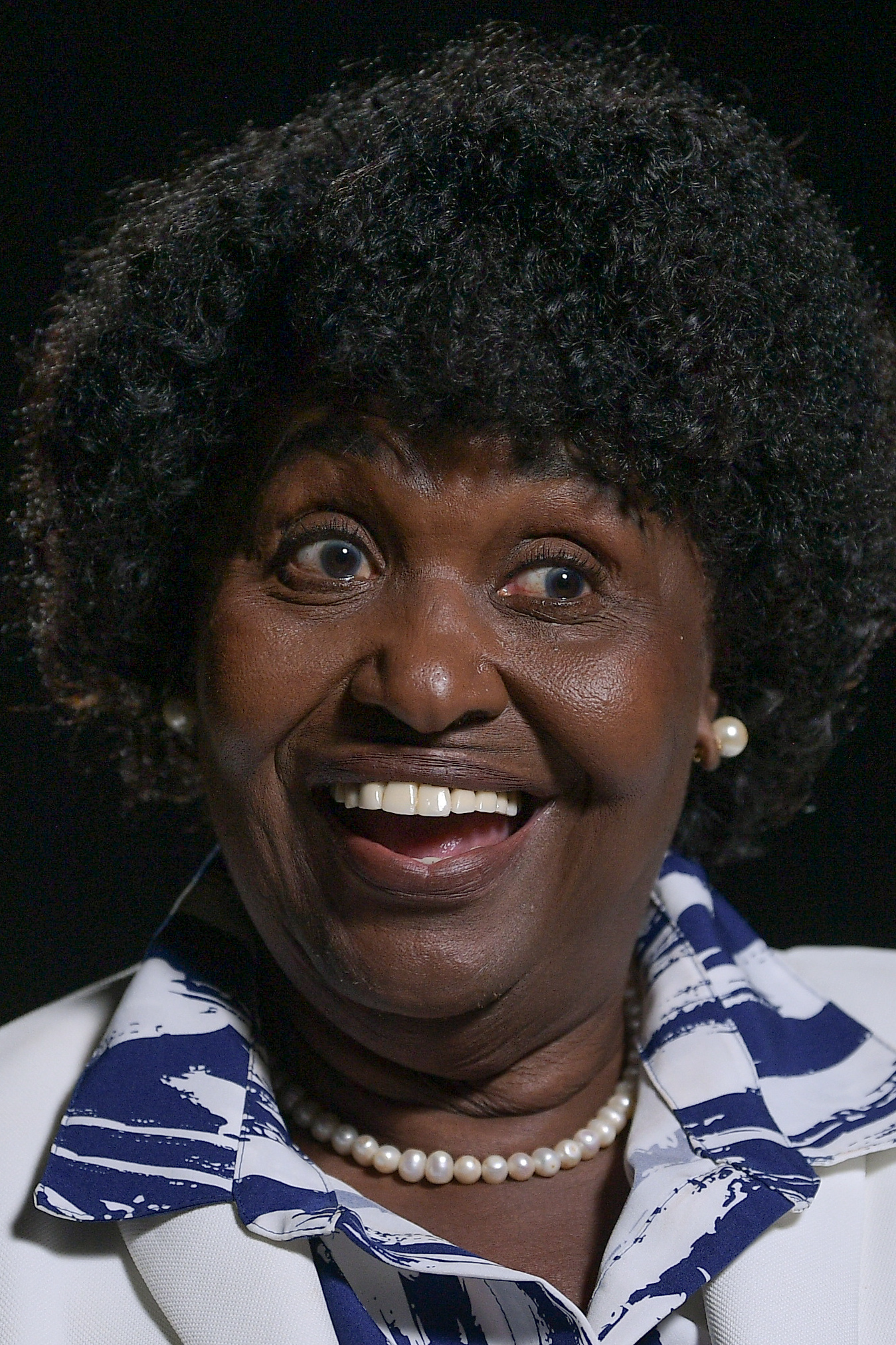
- Da Silva in 2024

Member of the Chamber of Deputies
- Incumbent
- Assumed office 1 February 2011
- Constituency: Rio de Janeiro
- In office 1 February 1987 – 1 February 1995
- Constituency: Rio de Janeiro

Minister of the Special Bureau of Labour and Social Assistance
- In office 1 January 2003 – 1 January 2007
- President: Luiz Inácio Lula da Silva
- Preceded by: Office established
- Succeeded by: Office abolished

Governor of Rio de Janeiro
- In office 6 April 2002 – 31 December 2002
- Lieutenant: Vacant
- Preceded by: Anthony Garotinho
- Succeeded by: Rosinha Garotinho

Lieutenant Governor of Rio de Janeiro
- In office 1 January 1999 – 5 April 2002
- Governor: Anthony Garotinho
- Preceded by: Luiz Paulo Corrêa da Rocha
- Succeeded by: Luiz Paulo Conde

Senator for Rio de Janeiro
- In office 1 February 1995 – 1 January 1999

Member of the Municipal Chamber of Rio de Janeiro
- In office 1 January 1983 – 1 January 1987

Personal details
- Born: 26 April 1942 (age 84) Rio de Janeiro, Brazil
- Party: PT (1982–present)
- Spouses: Nilton Aldano da Silva (m. 1962; died 1981) Aguinaldo Bezerra dos Santos (m. 1983; died 1988) Antônio Pitanga (m. 1992)
- Children: 2

Benedita Souza da Silva Sampaio (Brazilian Portuguese pronunciation: [beneˈdʒitɐ ˈsowzɐ da ˈsiwvɐ sɐ̃ˈpaju]; born 26 April 1942) is a Brazilian politician. From a working-class background, she faced class and racial prejudice, overcoming it to become the first female and Afro-Brazilian governor of the State of Rio de Janeiro and, later, Minister of the said Secretary of State as well in the Government of Luiz Inácio Lula da Silva.

== Early life ==
Da Silva was born on 26 April 1942 in Praia do Pinto, Rio de Janeiro, to Ovídia da Silva and is one of her mother's 13 children. Benedita da Silva is also known as Bene.

According to Da Silva, her mother's matriarchal tendencies have profoundly influenced her development. She grew up in the favela of Chapéu Mangueira in Copacabana. Da Silva was raped at the age of seven. She had several miscarriages and a baby that died soon after birth. At 16 she started working with the community school of the Chapéu Mangueira favela where she established a women's association and a women's branch of the Rio de Janeiro Federation of Favelas. She worked as a nursing aide and studied Social Studies. At the age of 40, Da Silva received her high-school diploma. She attended college at the same time as her 20-year-old daughter. During this period she also married a man named Manshino. She has two children, Pedro (born 1964) and Nilcéa (born 1966).

After Manshino's death, Da Silva became involved in community service, where she met her second husband Bola. Bola inspired her politically and coordinated her campaign, which resulted in Da Silva's historic election as the first Workers' Party governor in Rio. Five years later, Da Silva became a widow for the second time. She would later meet her new husband, the actor Pitanga, as she campaigned for as a senator candidate. These relationships and the dynamics of Brazilian life combined with her activism propelled Da Silva to political prominence and controversy.

She did so at a time when both women and black people were not visible in Brazil's political process. Neither the loss of two husbands nor the hostility of the Brazilian press deterred her politically.

== Current ==
Today, she is an advocate of women's rights both in Brazil and Latin America. Egalitarianism is her goal, not just for her constituents but to persons everywhere who are adversely affected by prejudice and poverty. According to Da Silva, "Racial democracy only exists in school books and official speeches; the elite in Brazil have promoted the myth of racial harmony to make people accept certain forms of discrimination and to deny the need for affirmative action." As a member of the African diaspora which came to the Americas as a result of the Maafa, and which stills suffer discrimination around the world based in the social relations constructed thereafter, Mrs Da Silva through her career is a figure who reinforces the benefits of full citizenship for racial minorities in Latin America.

== Political career ==
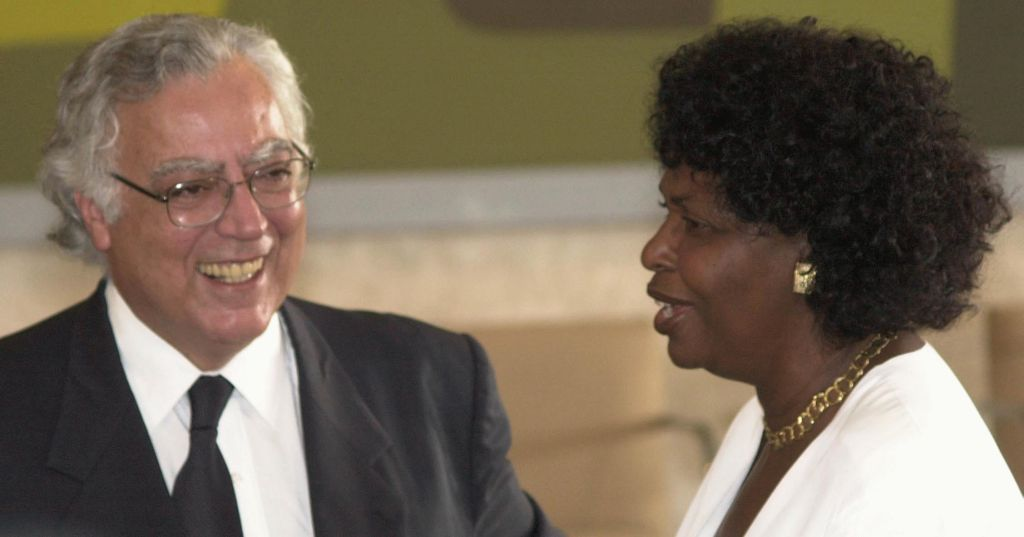
Miro Teixeira (left) and Benedita da Silva (right)

- 1982 - Elected city councilor of Rio de Janeiro for the Worker's Party.
- 1986 - Elected to the National Congress; fought to make amendments to the Brazilian Constitution on racial crimes, 120 days maternity leave, prohibition of difference of wages, and right of the prison inmates to breast-feed their children.
- 1994 - Elected to the Senate, becoming the first female senator in Brazil.
- 1998 - Became Vice-Governor of the State of Rio de Janeiro on the Anthony Garotinho ticket.
- 2002 - With Governor Anthony Garotinho resigning to run for president, Da Silva assumes the Governorship of the State of Rio de Janeiro, becoming the first woman and the first black person to occupy the office.
- 2003 - Leaving the State government, Silva takes the post of Social Action Secretary, where she remains until January 2004.
- 2006 - Assumed the general coordination of the campaign of re-election of current president Luiz Inácio Lula da Silva in the state of Rio de Janeiro. Some periodicals speculated that, she would run for mayor of the City of Rio de Janeiro in 2008. It didn't happen.

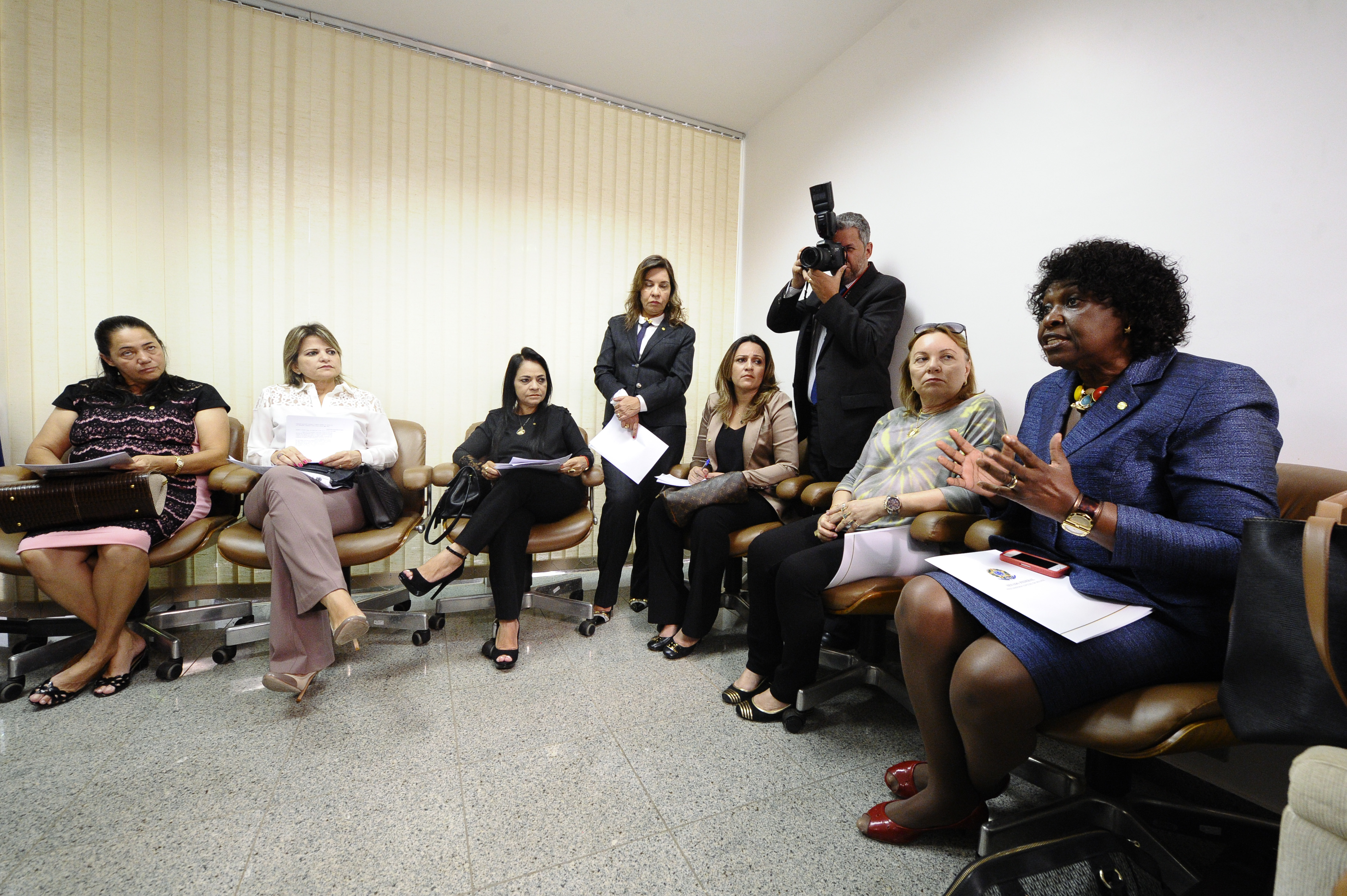

Benedita da Silva's journey to political leadership alone is enough to make a statement regarding her character and determination. Da Silva's biography, "Benedita da Silva: An Afro-Brazilian woman's story of politics and love", tells, through a collection of interviews, of her hardships and successes while conveying her message to members of her audience. Through the novel, da Silva is able to impact its readers while also bringing to light the many issues that a prominent in Brazil, particularly in the Brazilian Favelas. She exposes prominent and controversial issues such as abortion, poverty, rape and sexual abuse, and inequality that plagued her personally.

Da Silva's describes herself “three times a minority” (black, poor, and woman). Reportedly providing leverage in appealing to her electorate.

She is a devout Pentecostal and draws much of her ideology from the progressive wing of the Pentecostal movement in Brazil. She describes herself as a "PTcostal."

== Awards and recognitions ==
Throughout her career in politics and social activism, Benedita da Silva has received numerous awards and recognitions for her contributions to social justice, human rights, and cultural diversity. Here are some of the most notable honors and awards she has received:

UNICEF Award - In 1988, Benedita da Silva received an award from the United Nations Children's Fund (UNICEF) for her work promoting children's rights and welfare.

Medalha de Mérito Pedro Ernesto - In 1990, she received the Medalha de Mérito Pedro Ernesto from the city of Rio de Janeiro for her contributions to the city's social development

Order of Cultural Merit - In 1996, the Brazilian government awarded Benedita da Silva the Order of Cultural Merit for her contributions to the promotion of culture and diversity.

Medal of the Order of Merit of Bahia - In 2009, Benedita da Silva was awarded the Medal of the Order of Merit of Bahia for her outstanding contributions to the development of the state of Bahia.

Frei Tito Award - In 2010, she was awarded the Frei Tito de Alencar Prize by the Brazilian Bar Association for her human rights activism and political leadership.

Grand Cross of the Order of Rio Branco - In 2010, she was awarded the Grand Cross of the Order of Rio Branco, one of the highest honors given by the Brazilian government, for her significant contributions to the country's international relations.

Honorary Doctorate - In 2011, she received an honorary doctorate degree from the Federal University of Rio de Janeiro in recognition of her political and social contributions to Brazil.

Bertha Lutz Prize - In 2019, Benedita da Silva was awarded the Bertha Lutz Prize by the Brazilian Chamber of Deputies for her work promoting women's rights and gender equality.

Honorary Citizen - In 2019, Benedita da Silva was named an honorary citizen of the city of Salvador in recognition of her contributions to social justice and human rights.

== Memoir ==
Benedita da Silva's memoir, published in 1997, provides a narrative that delves into the multifaceted aspects of her life. Through her personal experiences, reflections, and insights, she highlights the interplay between poverty and social struggles, the complexities of race and identity within the context of Brazil, and the significance of family and culture in shaping her journey. Her persistence and resilience in the face of adversity emerge as prominent themes, underscoring her dedication to activism and social issues that resonate deeply with her connection to the favela community. The book offers a portrayal of her achievements, the challenges she has encountered, and her strong commitment to effecting positive change within Brazilian society.

== See also ==
- Afro-Brazilians

Political offices
Preceded by Luiz Paulo Corrêa da Rocha	Vice Governor of Rio de Janeiro; 1999–2002	Vacant Title next held by Luiz Paulo Conde
Preceded by Anthony Garotinho	Governor of Rio de Janeiro; 2002–2003	Succeeded by Rosinha Garotinho
Chamber of Deputies (Brazil)
Preceded by Jandira Feghali	Chair of Chamber Culture Committee; 2019–present	Incumbent
Party political offices
Preceded by Alessandro Molon	PT nominee for Mayor of Rio de Janeiro; 2020	Most recent
