= Israel Klabin =

Brazilian civil engineer

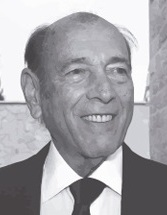

2nd Mayor of Rio de Janeiro
- In office 15 March 1979 – 3 June 1980
- Preceded by: Marcos Tamoio
- Succeeded by: Júlio Coutinho

Personal details
- Born: 20 September 1926 (age 100) Rio de Janeiro, Brazil
- Party: Brazilian Democratic Movement
- Spouse(s): Lina Caldas Paranhos (m. 1950; div. 1960) Léa Manela (m. 1975)
- Occupation: Civil engineer, mathematician, environmentalist, politician

Israel Klabin (born 20 September 1926) is a Brazilian civil engineer, mathematician, environmentalist and politician. He was born in Rio de Janeiro. He served as the second Mayor of Rio de Janeiro from 15 March 1979 to 3 June 1980. He was a member of the Brazilian Democratic Movement.

After serving as mayor, Klabin was president of the State Bank of Rio de Janeiro from 1980 to 1983.

== Political career ==
He was a founding member of the Instituto Superior de Estudos Brasileiros (ISEB), served as a consultant and regional development planner and co-authored guidelines for development in the Brazilian Northeast. He was also a member of the development council of the Pontifical Catholic University of Rio de Janeiro (PUC-Rio).

He was appointed as mayor in 1979 by the then Governor Chagas Freitas. He left the municipal leadership in 1980 because of the friction with the federal government due to his proposal to reexamine the law of the merger between the former state of Guanabara and the former state of Rio de Janeiro.

== Personal life ==
In 1950, he married Lina Caldas Paranhos, with whom he had four children. After separation, he married again in 1975 with Léa Manela, with whom he had three more children. One of his sons, Leonardo Klabin, was a state representative of Rio de Janeiro for the Brazilian Democratic Movement.
