= Saturnino Braga =

Brazilian politician (1931–2024)

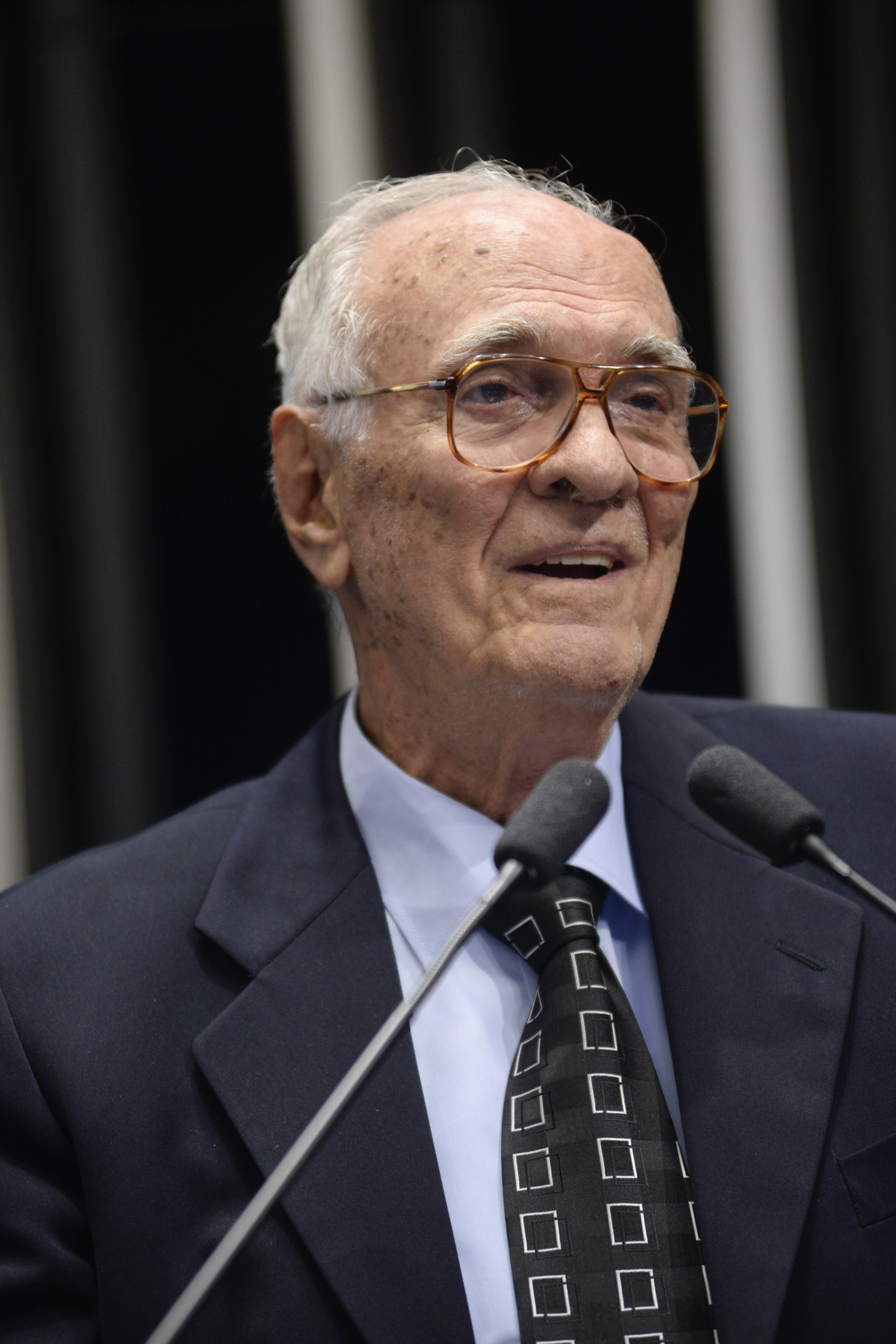
- Braga in 2017

Member of the Federal Senate of Brazil for Rio de Janeiro
- In office 1 February 1999 – 1 February 2007
- Preceded by: Abdias do Nascimento
- Succeeded by: Francisco Dornelles
- In office 1 February 1975 – 1 January 1986
- Preceded by: Paulo Francisco Torres
- Succeeded by: Jamil Haddad

Mayor of Rio de Janeiro
- In office 1 January 1986 – 1 January 1989
- Preceded by: Marcello Alencar
- Succeeded by: Marcello Alencar

Member of the Chamber of Deputies of Brazil for Rio de Janeiro
- In office 22 April 1968 – 21 August 1968
- In office 1 February 1963 – 1 February 1967

Personal details
- Born: Roberto Saturnino Braga; 13 September 1931 Rio de Janeiro, Brazil
- Died: 3 October 2024 (aged 93) Rio de Janeiro, Brazil
- Party: MDB; PDT; PSB; PT
- Education: Federal University of Rio de Janeiro
- Occupation: Engineer

Roberto Saturnino Braga (13 September 1931 – 3 October 2024) was a Brazilian engineer and politician. A member of several political parties, he served in the Chamber of Deputies from 1963 to 1967 and from April to August 1968, was a senator from 1975 to 1986 and from 1999 to 2007, and served as mayor of Rio de Janeiro from 1986 to 1989.

Braga died in Rio de Janeiro on 3 October 2024, at the age of 93.
