= Barravento =

1962 film directed by Glauber Rocha

- Theatrical release poster
- Directed by: Glauber Rocha
- Written by: Glauber Rocha; José Telles de Magalhães; Luiz Paulino dos Santos
- Produced by: Braga Netto; Rex Schindler
- Starring: Antonio Pitanga; Luíza Maranhão; Aldo Teixeira; Lucy Carvalho
- Cinematography: Tony Rabatony
- Edited by: Nelson Pereira dos Santos
- Music by: Washington Bruno
- Production company: Iglu Filmes
- Distributed by: Horus Filmes
- Release date: 1962
- Running time: 78 minutes
- Country: Brazil
- Language: Portuguese

Barravento (Portuguese: [ˌbaʁɐˈvẽtu], lit. 'The Turning Wind') is a 1962 Brazilian drama film directed by Glauber Rocha. The directorial debut of Rocha, it stars Antonio Pitanga, Luíza Maranhão, Lucy Carvalho, and Aldo Teixeira. It is one of the most important films of the Cinema Novo movement, which addressing the socio-political problems of Brazil. It was entirely shot on locations of Salvador, Bahia between 1959 and September 1960.

== Plot ==
In a village of xaréu (Kingfish) fishermen, whose ancestors came as slaves from Africa, where old mystic cults connected to candomblé persist. The arrival of Firmino, a former inhabitant who moved to Salvador, running away from poverty, transforms the peaceable picture of the place, and polarizes tensions. Firmino is attracted to Cota, but he is not able to forget Naína who, on her part, likes Aruã. Firmino curses Aruã and cuts the fishing net in order to impede the fishing. Firmino stirs up the fishermen to revolt against the owner of the net so Policemen arrive at the village to control the equipment. In his fight against exploitation, Firmino argues against the master, mediator between the fishermen and the owner of the net. A fisherman convinces Aruã of fishing without the net, since his chastity would make him a protected man of Iemanjá. The fishermen are successful in their peace work, under the leadership of Aruã. Naína reveals her impossible love for Aruã to a Shaman woman. In his defeat against mysticism, Firmino convinces Cota of taking away Aruã’s virginity, and consequently breaking the religious enchantment that makes him a protected man of Iemanjá. Aruã takes the bait. A storm announces the “barravento”, the violent turning wind. Firmino convinces Naína's father to go out to sea, which takes his life as well as that of another fisherman who tried to save him. The next morning Firmino denounces Aruã’s loss of chastity. The Master reneges. Naína accepts to do the ritual. Firmino decides to leave for the city to work and to earn money for the purchase of a his own net. In the same place where Firmino arrived at the village, Aruã leaves for the city.

== Cast ==
- Antonio Pitanga as Firmino (credited as Antonio Sampaio)
- Luíza Maranhão as Cota
- Lucy Carvalho as Naína
- Aldo Teixeira as Aruã
- Lidio Silva as Master
