= Annenberg Public Policy Center =

Research center affiliated with University of Pennsylvania

Annenberg Public Policy Center of the University of Pennsylvania
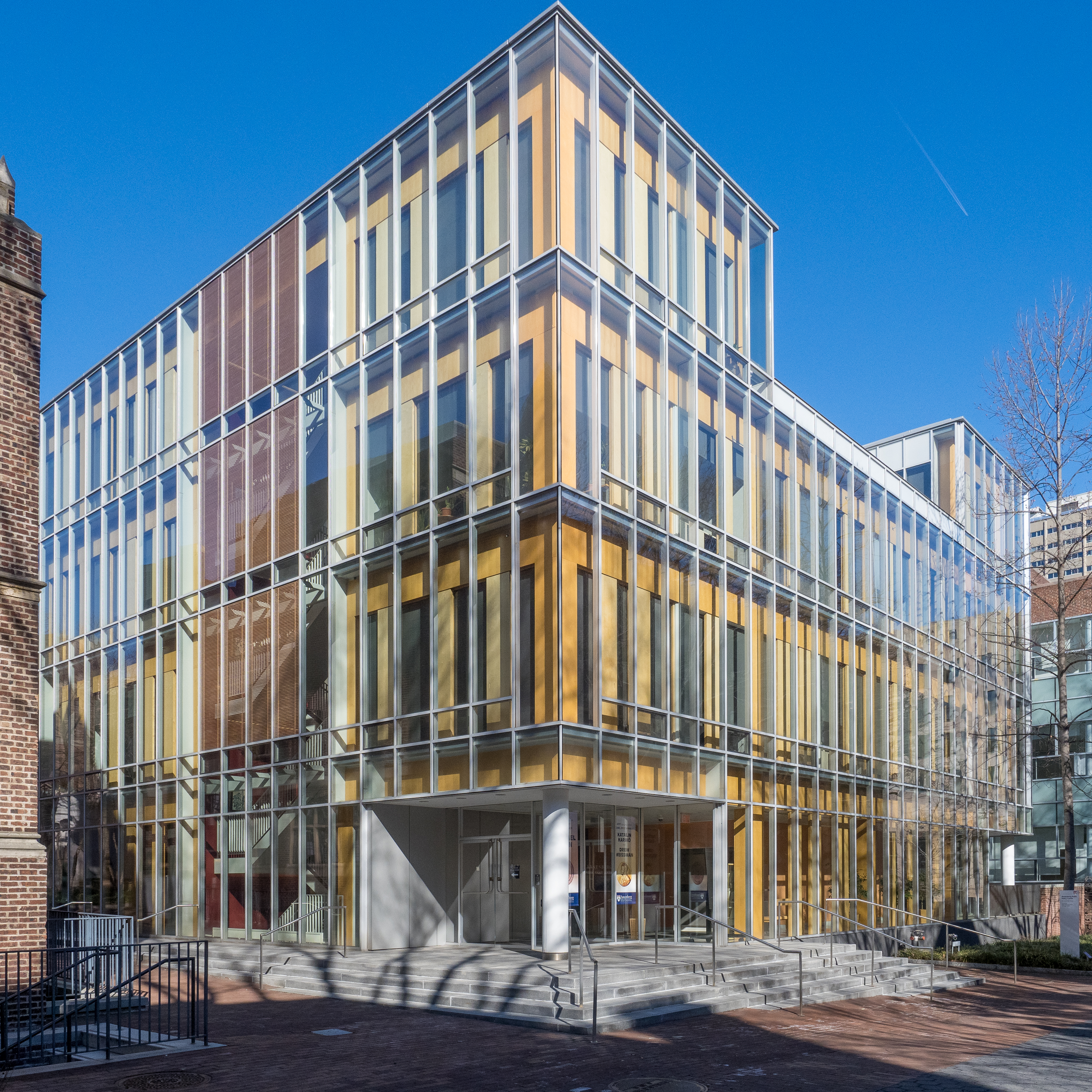
- Type: Public policy research center
- Established: 1993
- Parent institution: University of Pennsylvania
- Director: Dolores Albarracín
- Location: 202 S. 36th St., Philadelphia, Pennsylvania, 19104-3806, United States
- Website: http://www.annenbergpublicpolicycenter.org/

The Annenberg Public Policy Center (APPC) is a center for the study of public policy at the Annenberg School for Communication at the University of Pennsylvania. It is based in West Philadelphia on the campus of the University of Pennsylvania.

== History ==
The APPC was established in 1993 by Walter and Leonore Annenberg and its ongoing funding comes from an endowment established for it at that time by the Annenberg Foundation.

== Activities ==
The Annenberg Center is a research center. The Annenberg Center conducts research, convenes panels of experts, hosts lectures and conferences, and publishes reports on five main areas: Political communication, information and society, media and children, health communication, and adolescent risk.

Among the center’s projects are the fact-checking website FactCheck.org, co-founded by APPC’s founding director, Kathleen Hall Jamieson and Brooks Jackson in 2003, and Annenberg Classroom, which provides free resources for teaching about the U.S. Constitution. The center also is a founder and coordinator of the Civics Renewal Network, a consortium of more than 40 nonpartisan civics organizations. In 2026, it had around 50 people, including staff, researchers, and postdoctoral fellows.

Architect Fumihiko Maki designed the Center's facilities.

== Research divisions ==
- Institutions of Democracy (head: Matt Levendusky)
- Communication Science, created in 2014 (head: Dolores Albarracín)
- Climate Communication, created in 2024

== Directors ==
- 1993-: Kathleen Hall Jamieson
- Since 2026: Dolores Albarracín
