= List of mayors of Rio de Janeiro =

Mayor of Rio de Janeiro
- Prefeito do Rio de Janeiro

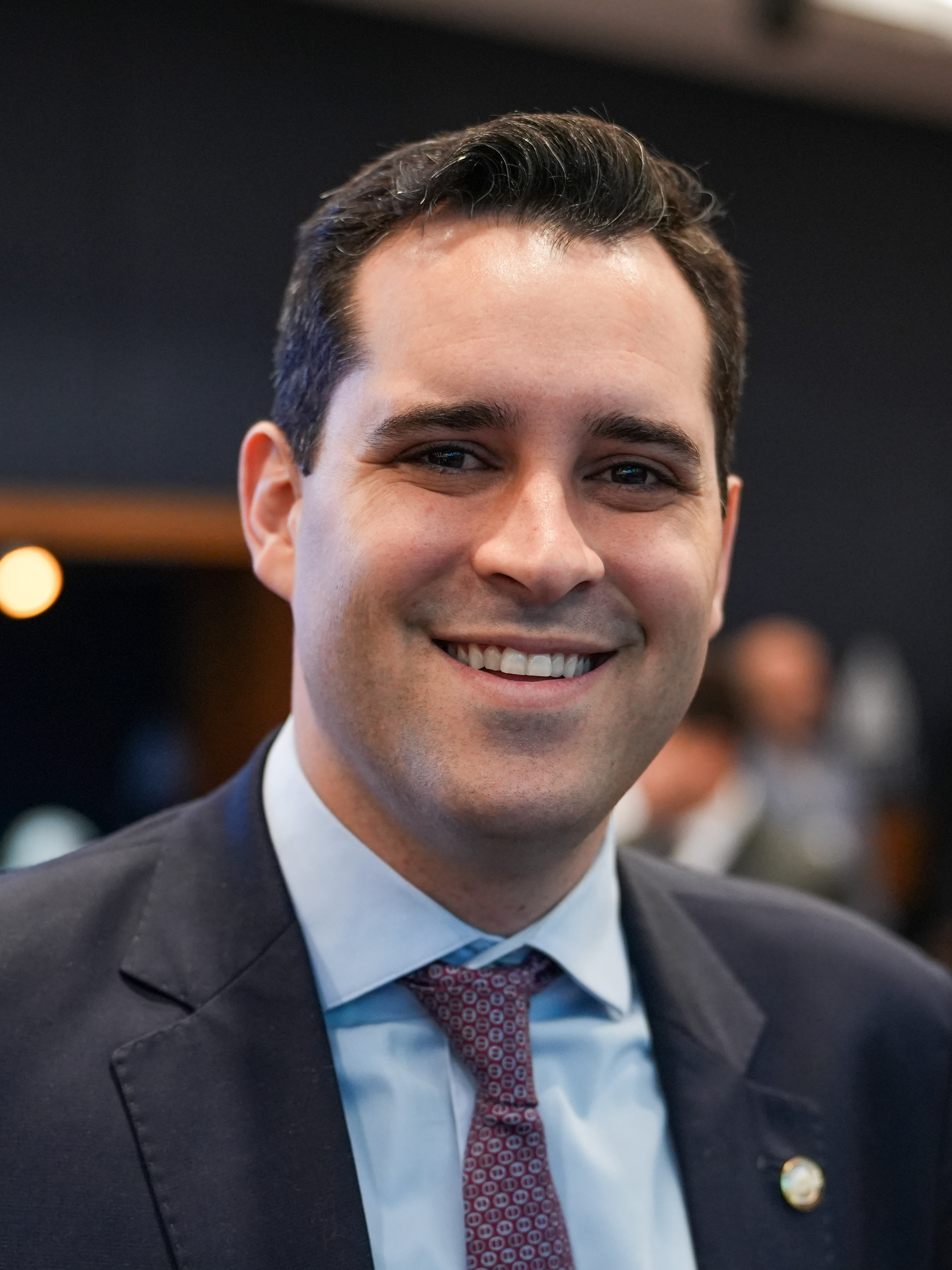
- Incumbent; Eduardo Cavaliere since 20 March 2026
- Term length: Four years, renewable once
- Inaugural holder: Francisco Antônio Pessoa de Barros
- Formation: 17 November 1889; 136 years ago
- Deputy: Vice Mayor

This is a list of mayors of Rio de Janeiro.

== History ==
The city of Rio de Janeiro was founded in 1565. It was the seat of the Crown captaincy of Rio de Janeiro, a district of colonial Brazil under Portuguese rule. In 1763 Rio de Janeiro city became the capital of the colony, then named State of Brazil. In 1815 Brazil became a kingdom within the United Kingdom of Portugal, Brazil and the Algarves; the captaincy of Rio de Janeiro became the province of Rio de Janeiro, within the Kingdom of Brazil, and the city of Rio de Janeiro continued to be the capital of both the Kingdom and the Province. Also, the Portuguese Court had moved to Rio in 1808, so that, even before the creation of the United Kingdom, the city was the de facto capital of the whole Portuguese Empire. In 1821 the Royal Court returned to Portugal, and in 1822 Brazil proclaimed its independence, with the establishment of the Empire of Brazil. The city of Rio de Janeiro was the Empire's capital, and, until 1834, it also remained the capital of the Province of Rio de Janeiro.

Not only in the case of Rio, but for all Brazilian cities, the office of mayor, separate from the city council, only came into existence after Brazil became a Republic in 1889. In the pre-independence era (comprising both the colonial and the United Kingdom periods), the city council discharged both Executive, as well as limited Legislative and Judicial functions. After independence, city councils lost its Judicial powers with the establishment of an independent Judicial Branch distinct from the political Branches of the State, but, during the Empire of Brazil era (1822–1889), city councils remained invested with limited legislative powers (the enactment of municipal postures, in Portuguese posturas municipais), as well as with Executive functions, with no office of mayor.

During the colonial period, the city councils of the major cities, such as Rio, were referred to as the Senado da Câmara. Also, during the pre-independence period, the presiding officer of the most important city councils was a royal magistrate (known as the Juiz de Fora, literally Outside Judge) appointed by the King or by other royal functionaries (colonial governors, etc.), to lead the city council. After the Independence of Brazil, the office of Juiz de Fora was abolished, city councils ceased to have a judicial role; after Independence, in the Empire of Brazil era, all Brazilian city councils were led by a president, who was the councilman with the most votes in the elections for the council. The composition, structure and powers of Rio's city council, and of all the city and village councils of Brazil, was reformed in 1828, with the adoption of the Organic Law of the Municipal Councils (Imperial Law of 1 October 1828). In the case of Rio, the newly constituted city council (no longer titled Senado da Câmara, but instead named Câmara Municipal, began to operate in 1830.

Until 1834, although it was the Nation's Capital, Rio was administered just like any other Brazilian city: it was part of a Province, and its municipal government was discharged by a local council, with no mayor, and with the council's presiding officer (first the Outside Judges in the pre-independence period, then the council presidents in the era of the independent Empire), leading the council's affairs. However, until 1834, unlike other Provinces, that were led by a president appointed by the imperial government, alongside an elected provincial general council, the Province of Rio de Janeiro, because it contained the Empire's capital, had no president or general council, instead being administered directly by the imperial government, under the authority of the Minister and Secretary of State for the Affairs of the Empire (Ministro e Secretário de Estado para os Negócios do Império), the country's Justice and Interior minister.

However, in 1834, an amendment to the Constitution of the Empire of Brazil (the 1834 Additional Act), among other provisions, set the city of Rio de Janeiro, as the country's capital, apart from the Nation's provinces. The seat of the province of Rio de Janeiro was moved to the city of Niterói, and the city of Rio de Janeiro was included in a Neutral Municipality (in Portuguese, Município Neutro), belonging to no province, and answering directly to the imperial government. The 1834 Additional Act also replaced provincial general councils with more powerful provincial legislative assemblies. Along with separating the Empire's capital (the city of Rio de Janeiro) from the Province of Rio de Janeiro, the 1934 Additional Act put an end to the direct administration of the Province of Rio de Janeiro by the Imperial Government under the responsibility of the Minister for the Empire. Thus, from 1834 onwards, the Province of Rio de Janeiro, with its capital in Niterói, was governed under the same system that applied to the other Provinces of the Empire: the Executive authority was vested in a province president, appointed by the emperor, who served alongside an elected Provincial Legislative Assembly. After this 1834 reform, however, the Province of Rio de Janeiro had no jurisdiction over the city of Rio de Janeiro, that was a separate political entity as the Neutral Municipality, not belonging to any Province. Within the Neutral Municipality, the imperial government, in addition to discharging the competences of the central government, directly discharged, with regard to the city of Rio de Janeiro, the competences that were proper to provincial governments. Nevertheless, in the Neutral Municipality, Municipal functions continued under the authority of the city council (Câmara Municipal), and, after the 1834 Additional Act, the city council remained constituted as before: led by its president, and with no separate office of mayor, the president of the city council being the councilman elected with most votes in the local elections. The powers and duties of the municipal authorities of the Neutral Municipality were the same of the municipal authorities of all other Brazilian municipalities, and the election, composition and powers of the city council continued to be regulated by the 1828 Organic Law of the Municipal Councils. However, as a result of the 1834 reform, since it was no longer part of any province, the city of Rio de Janeiro gained direct representation in the Imperial Parliament: the people of Neutral Municipality were represented in the General Assembly (the Empire's Parliament) by a delegation of senators and members of the Chamber of Deputies, elected as if the Neutral Municipality were a province.

In 1889 the Empire of Brazil was abolished by a military coup d'état, and replaced with a Federal Republic. Brazil's provinces became States, and the Neutral Municipality became the Federal District (Distrito Federal in Portuguese), with the city of Rio de Janeiro continuing to be the Nation's capital. The old Province of Rio de Janeiro became the State of Rio de Janeiro (retaining Niterói as its capital), and it continued to be an entity completely separate from the city of Rio de Janeiro. While in the imperial era the central government retained the provincial-level functions and the Neutral Municipality discharged only municipal functions, in the new Federal Republic, the Federal District discharged all municipal competences and most competences of a state, except as otherwise provided by the Federal Constitution or by Federal Laws; it elected senators and federal deputies as if it were a state.

However, the Federal Government of the newly created Republic assumed the power of appointing the city's executive leaders, and the power to elect the municipal executive of the Republic's capital was only given to the people decades after the capital of Brazil had been transferred from Rio to Brasília, while in the imperial period the leadership of the municipality was elected by popular vote. Rio was the capital of republican Brazil from the Proclamation of the Republic in 1889 until 1960. During the period of the Provisional Government (1889–1891), when the institutional framework of the new republican Federation was still being created, the elected city council (Câmara Municipal) was dissolved, and the Federal District was transitionally administered by a council of unelected Intendentes Municipais, appointed by the Federal Provisional Government. Francisco Antonio Pessoa de Barros was the first president of that council of Intendentes. The Council of Intendentes discharged both executive and legislative functions. In 1891, that temporary arrangement ceased, the Council of Intendentes was abolished, and the permanent structures of the government of the Federal District were created, with the recreation the city council, resuming the old name of Câmara Municipal, and with the establishment of the separate executive office of the mayor of the Federal District. Thus the city council (Câmara Municipal), elected by the city's people, resumed its role as the local body of lawmaking and oversight, but it lost its executive powers, and a separate executive office of mayor was created for the Federal District. From then on, therefore, the presidents of the council became mere presiding officers of a legislative chamber, and administrative functions were transferred from the council and its president to the mayor of the Federal District (in Portuguese, Prefeito do Distrito Federal, literally meaning Prefect of the Federal District). While the several States elected its Governments, the mayors of the Federal District during that period were appointed by the president of the Republic, and thus answered to the Federal Government. Accordingly, all mayors of the Federal District during the period when Rio de Janeiro was the capital of the Republic (1889–1960) were presidential appointees. The presidential appointment of the mayor required confirmation by the Brazilian Federal Senate. Barata Ribeiro took office as the first mayor of the Federal District in 1892.

From 1937 to 1946, during the Estado Novo dictatorship of President Getúlio Vargas, the city council of the Federal District was dissolved (on a theoretically provisional basis, pending elections that, however, were never held until the overthrowal of the dictator), and, during that period, and a Federal Interventor governed the Federal District, discharging both the executive functions of the office of mayor and the legislative functions of the dissolved city council. Henrique Dodsworth was the Federal Interventor during the whole period of the Estado Novo regime. When Vargas was deposed, Dodsworth was removed as Interventor by transitional administration of President José Linhares, and, appointed by Linhares, Filadelfo de Azevedo served as the second and last Federal Interventor, pending elections for a National Constituent Assembly and for the city council of the Federal District. In 1946, after the deposition of the dictatorship and the restoration of democratic freedoms in Brazil, the Federal Intervention ceased, and the separate institutions of the mayor and the city council were reestablished, following the same pattern that existed before 1937: the executive mayor was nominated by the president of the Republic and appointed after approval by the Federal Senate, and legislative powers within the Federal District were vested in the directly elected city council. Appointed by President Eurico Gaspar Dutra, Hildebrando de Araújo Góis became the first mayor of the Federal District after the termination of the Intervention on 2 February 1946.

On 21 April 1960, the city of Rio lost its status as the country's capital: the capital of Brazil was transferred to the newly built city of Brasília, and that city thus became the seat of the new Federal District. On that day, the old Federal District became a new State within the Brazilian Federal Republic, under the name of State of Guanabara. Because it was made up of a single city (the city of Rio de Janeiro), the State of Guanabara was the only State in Brazil not divided into municipalities. Therefore, Guanabara was a state, and its State Government discharged both state and municipal competences. The first governor of Guanabara, José Sette Câmara Filho, was appointed on an interim capacity by the president of the Republic, after his nomination was approved by the Brazilian Federal Senate, to lead a provisional Administration until the State could organize itself and elect its officers. Sette Camara took office on the same date the new State came into being, but in December 1960 Carlos Lacerda was sworn-in as the first elected governor of the newly constituted State of Guanabara, serving alongside the State Legislative Assembly. Lacerda thus became the first leader directly elected by the people of Rio to govern the city in a purely Executive office held by a single person and separate from the city council (or its successor State Legislative Assembly).

Under Brazil's 1946 Constitution, state governors were elected by direct popular ballot (as they are nowadays) but, during the 1964–1985 military dictatorship, indirect elections for governor were implemented from 1970 onwards, and governors were elected by the State Legislative Assemblies during the 1970s. As part of the process of transition to democracy, popular elections for state governors were reinstated from 1982 onwards. Accordingly, in the 1960 and 1965 elections, the governors of the State of Guanabara were chosen by popular vote, and in the 1970 election the governor was chosen by the state assembly.

In 1975, during Brazil's military dictatorship, the Federal Government decided to abolish the State of Guanabara by forcing it to merge with the State of Rio de Janeiro. This was possible only due to the exceptionally centralizing constitutional legislation that governed Brazil during the 1964–1985 military regime: the merger was implemented by federal statute, without any vote of the populations affected and without any consultation with the state assemblies involved. Juridically, a new state was born out of the merger of the two preceding ones, although this new State was also named State of Rio de Janeiro, and in spite of the fact that the Constituent Assembly of the new State later decided to keep the same flag that had been used by the old State of Rio de Janeiro. The city of Rio de Janeiro (formerly the seat of the State of Guanabara), became the capital of the new State of Rio de Janeiro. With the abolition of the old State of Rio de Janeiro, the city of Niterói ceased to be a State capital. The merger was implemented on 15 March 1975. From then on, therefore, the city of Rio de Janeiro ceased to be included in the State of Guanabara and the position of governor of Guanabara ceased to exist.

While the new State of Rio de Janeiro assumed the state-level powers and state duties of the former state of Guanabara, a new political entity was created at the local level as a result of the merger of the two States: the Municipality of Rio de Janeiro (Município do Rio de Janeiro), the legal entity that governs the city at the municipal level and that assumed the municipal-level powers and duties that previously had been discharged by the state of Guanabara jointly with state-level functions.

Therefore, after the 1975 merger between the old State of Rio de Janeiro and the State of Guanabara, with the creation of the new State of Rio de Janeiro and of the Municipality of Rio de Janeiro, the city of Rio became for the first time since 1834 a normal Brazilian city, with an ordinary municipal administration like other cities: it is constituted as a municipality that forms part of a State, that in turn forms part of the Nation; indeed, with the 1975 merger of States, for the first time since 1834, the city of Rio de Janeiro became once again a part of the surrounding Rio de Janeiro Province or State (and its Capital city). From then on, in the city of Rio de Janeiro, a city council (Câmara Municipal) discharges the municipal Legislative authority, while Executive functions of the Municipality are vested in the separate office of mayor (Prefeito, literally Prefect). The Executive Branch of the city's government is called Municipal Prefecture (Prefeitura Municipal).

Until the termination of Brazil's military dictatorship in 1985, mayors of the City of Rio de Janeiro (as well as the mayors of the other Brazilian state capitals) were appointed by the state governor. In March 1975 Marcos Tamoio became the first mayor of Rio de Janeiro as a Municipality of the State of Rio de Janeiro, by appointment of the new state's first governor, Floriano Faria Lima.

Since 1985 the mayors of Rio de Janeiro – as well as the mayors of all other Brazilian municipalities, including state capitals – are elected by the people, by direct universal suffrage. In 1985 Saturnino Braga became the city's first directly elected chief executive since the 1965 election for Governor of Guanabara, and Rio's first directly elected mayor. Since the adoption of a Federal Constitutional Amendment in 1997, mayors can stand for reelection, for one consecutive term.

== Federal District (1889–1960) ==
=== Presidents of the Council of Intendants of the Federal District (1889–1892) ===
- Francisco Antônio Pessoa de Barros (1889–1890)
- José Félix da Cunha Meneses (1890–1891)
- Nicolau Joaquim Moreira (1891–1892)

=== Mayors of the Federal District (1892–1937) ===
- Barata Ribeiro (1892–1893)
- Henrique Valadares (1893–1895)
- Francisco Furquim Werneck de Almeida (1895–1897)
- Ubaldino do Amaral (1897–1898)
- Cesário Alvim (1898–1899)
- Honório Gurgel (1899–1900)
- Antônio Coelho Rodrigues (1900)
- João Filipe Pereira (1900–1901)
- Xavier da Silveira (1901–1902)
- Pereira Passos (1902–1906)
- Rivadávia Correia (1914–1916)
- Amaro Cavalcanti (1917–1918)
- Paulo de Frontin (1919)
- Miclades Mário de Sá Freire (1919–1920)
- Carlos César de Oliveira Sampaio (1920–1922)
- Alaor Prata (1922–1926)
- Antônio da Silva Prado Júnior (1926–1930)
- Adolfo Bergamini (1930–1931)
- Pedro Ernesto Baptista (1931–1934)
- Augusto do Amaral Peixoto (1934–1935)
- Pedro Ernesto Baptista (1935–1936)
- Olímpio de Melo (1936–1937)

=== Federal Interventors in the Federal District (1937–1946) ===
- Henrique de Toledo Dodsworth (1937–1945)
- Filadelfo de Azevedo (1945–1946)

=== Mayors of the Federal District (1946–1960) ===
- Hildebrando de Araújo Góis (1946–1947)
- Ângelo Mendes de Morais (1947–1951)
- João Carlos Vital (1951–1952)
- Dulcídio Cardoso (1952–1954)
- Alim Pedro (1954–1955)
- Francisco Negrão de Lima (1956–1958)
- José J. de Sá Freire Alvim (1958–1960)

== State of Guanabara (1960–1975) ==
=== Governors of the State of Guanabara (1960–1975) ===
	Portrait	Name (Birth–Death)	Term (Elected)	Term of office		Political Party
1		José Sette Câmara Filho (1920–2002)	Provisional governor appointed by the Federal Government with the advice and consent of the Brazilian Federal Senate.	21 April 1960	5 December 1960	Independent
2		Carlos Lacerda (1914–1977)	• (1960)	5 December 1960	11 October 1965	National Democratic Union
3		Raphael de Almeida Magalhães (1930–2011)	• Vice-governor, succeeded to the governorship upon the resignation of the elected governor.	11 October 1965	5 December 1965	National Democratic Union
4		Francisco Negrão de Lima (1901–1981)	• (1965)	5 December 1965	15 March 1970	Social Democratic Party
5		Antonio de Pádua Chagas Freitas (1914–1991)	• (1970) Elected by the state assembly	15 March 1970	15 March 1975	Brazilian Democratic Movement

== Municipality of Rio de Janeiro (1975–present) ==
=== Mayors of the Municipality of Rio de Janeiro (1975–present) ===
	Portrait	Name (Birth–Death)	Term (Elected)	Term of office		Political Party
19		Marcos Tamoio (1926–1981)	Appointed by State Government	15 March 1975	15 March 1979	National Renewal Alliance
20		Israel Klabin (born 1926)	Appointed by State Government	15 March 1979	3 June 1980	Brazilian Democratic Movement
21		Júlio Coutinho (1929–2009)	Appointed by State Government	3 June 1980	15 March 1983	Brazilian Democratic Movement Party
22		Jamil Haddad (1926–2009)	Appointed by State Government	15 March 1983	5 December 1983	Democratic Labour Party
23		Marcello Alencar (1925–2014)	Appointed by State Government	5 December 1983	1 January 1986	Democratic Labour Party
24		Saturnino Braga (1931–2024)	• (1985)	1 January 1986	1 January 1989	Democratic Labour Party
24		Saturnino Braga (1931–2024)	• (1985)	1 January 1986	1 January 1989	Brazilian Socialist Party
25		Marcello Alencar (1925–2014)	2nd (1988)	1 January 1989	1 January 1993	Democratic Labour Party
26		Cesar Maia (born 1945)	1st (1992)	1 January 1993	1 January 1997	Brazilian Democratic Movement Party
27		Luiz Paulo Conde (1934–2015)	• (1996)	1 January 1997	1 January 2001	Liberal Front Party
28		Cesar Maia (born 1945)	2nd (2000)	1 January 2001	1 January 2009	Brazilian Labour Party
28		Cesar Maia (born 1945)	2nd (2000)	1 January 2001	1 January 2009	Democrats
28		Cesar Maia (born 1945)	3rd (2004)	1 January 2001	1 January 2009	Democrats
29		Eduardo Paes (born 1969)	1st (2008)	1 January 2009	1 January 2017	Brazilian Democratic Movement Party
29		Eduardo Paes (born 1969)	2nd (2012)	1 January 2009	1 January 2017	Brazilian Democratic Movement Party
30		Marcelo Crivella (born 1957)	• (2016)	1 January 2017	1 January 2021	Republicanos
36		Eduardo Paes (born 1969)	3rd (2020)	1 January 2021	20 March 2026	Democrats
36		Eduardo Paes (born 1969)	3rd (2020)	1 January 2021	20 March 2026	Social Democratic Party
36		Eduardo Paes (born 1969)	4th (2024)	1 January 2021	20 March 2026	Social Democratic Party
37		Eduardo Cavaliere (born 1994)	•	20 March 2026	Incumbent	Social Democratic Party

== See also ==
- List of mayors of largest cities in Brazil (in Portuguese)
- List of mayors of capitals of Brazil (in Portuguese)
