= Anthony Garotinho =

Brazilian politician (born 1960)

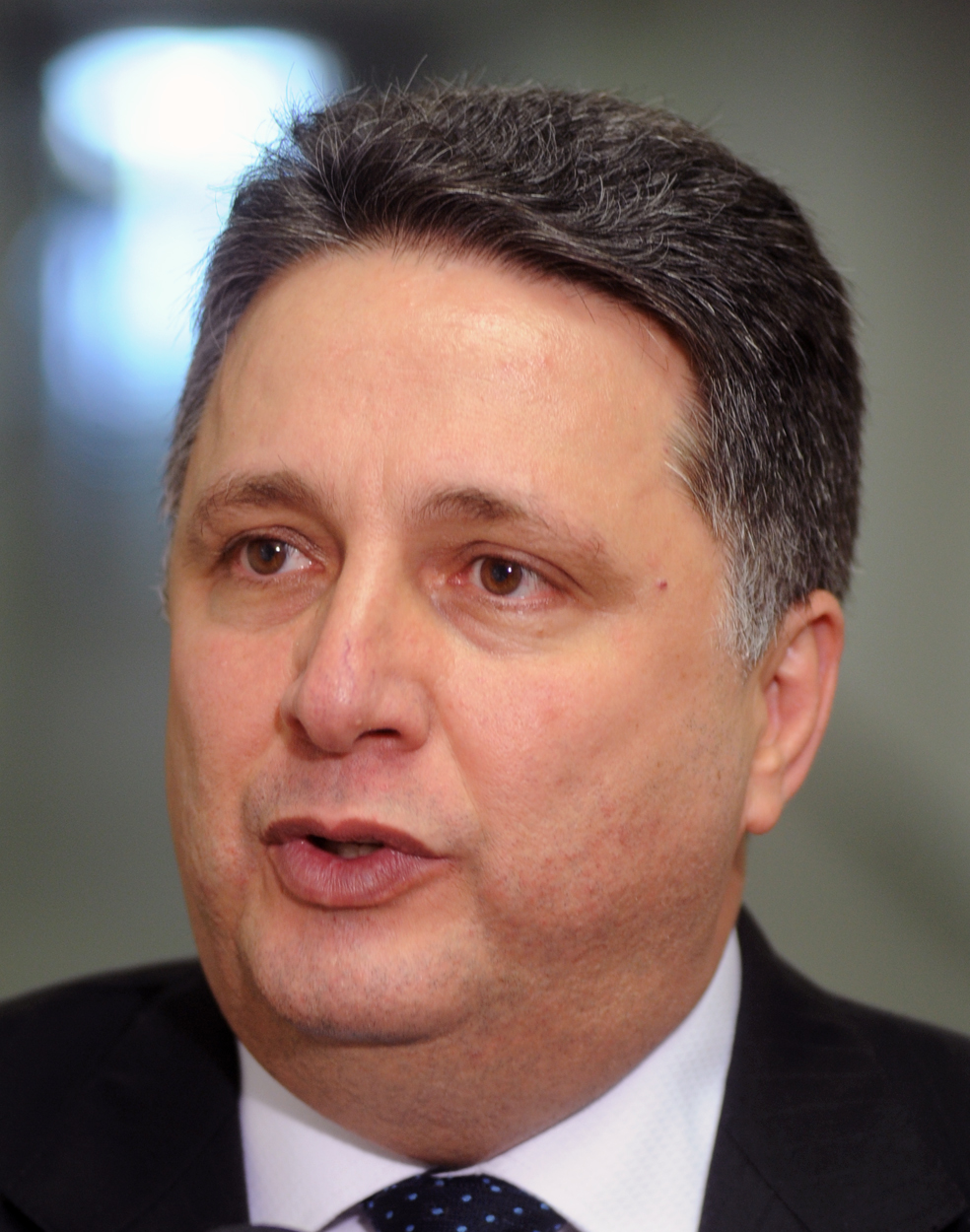

Member of the Chamber of Deputies
- In office 1 February 2011 – 1 February 2015
- Constituency: Rio de Janeiro

Secretary of Public Security of Rio de Janeiro
- In office 23 April 2003 – 27 September 2004
- Governor: Rosinha Garotinho
- Preceded by: Josias Quental
- Succeeded by: Marcelo Itagiba

First Gentleman of Rio de Janeiro
- In role 1 January 2003 – 1 January 2007
- Governor: Rosinha Garotinho
- Preceded by: Antônio Pitanga
- Succeeded by: Adriana Ancelmo

Governor of Rio de Janeiro
- In office 1 January 1999 – 6 April 2002
- Lieutenant: Benedita da Silva
- Preceded by: Marcello Alencar
- Succeeded by: Benedita da Silva

Mayor of Campos dos Goytacazes
- In office 1 January 1997 – 31 March 1998
- Deputy: Arnaldo Vianna
- Preceded by: Sérgio Mendes
- Succeeded by: Arnaldo Vianna
- In office 1 January 1989 – 5 February 1992
- Deputy: Sérgio Mendes
- Preceded by: Zezé Barbosa
- Succeeded by: Sérgio Mendes

Secretary of Agriculture and Interior of Rio de Janeiro
- In office 5 February 1992 – 20 September 1993
- Governor: Leonel Brizola
- Preceded by: Tito Ryff
- Succeeded by: Bernardo Bello

Member of the Legislative Assembly of Rio de Janeiro
- In office 1 February 1987 – 1 January 1989
- Constituency: At-large

Personal details
- Born: Anthony William Matheus de Oliveira; 18 April 1960 (age 66) Campos dos Goytacazes, Rio de Janeiro, Brazil
- Party: Republicanos (2024–present)
- Other political affiliations: PT (1980–1983); PDT (1983–2000); PSB (2001–2003); PMDB (2003–2009); PR (2009–2018); PRP (2018–2019); Patriota (2019); PROS (2019–2022); UNIÃO (2022–2024)
- Spouse: Rosinha Assed (m. 1981)
- Education: Colégio Bittencourt (degree in accounting)
- Occupation: Radio broadcaster

Anthony William Matheus de Oliveira (born 18 April 1960), also known as Anthony Garotinho, is a Brazilian politician and radio broadcaster. He legally adopted his stage name "Garotinho" (Little Boy in Portuguese), originally a nickname he took while working as a radio sports broadcaster.

He is also one of the best known Brazilian evangelical politicians. Garotinho believes he was reborn as an evangelical Christian following a car crash in 1994. He is married to Rosinha Matheus and has nine children, of whom five are adopted.

== Early career ==
A popular radio anchorman, fond of amateur theater, Garotinho entered politics through grassroots activism, joining the Brazilian Communist Party and helping to reorganize the sugar-cane workers' union in Campos. He entered electoral politics in 1982, presenting himself as candidate for a councilman seat in the same city on the Workers' Party ticket, failing to be elected because the party's list of candidates didn't achieve the necessary threshold of ballots to have a representation in the Municipal Chamber. Afterwards, he joined the Democratic Labour Party (PDT), being elected for the state legislature (1986) and winning the Campos mayoral elections in 1988 in which the party's head Leonel Brizola campaigned for him.

After his term as mayor of Campos (1989–1992), during which he took some measures to support small producers and to develop alternatives to sugar cane monoculture, as well as supported MST settler projects, he was chosen by Governor Leonel Brizola as State Secretary of Agriculture (1993–1994), presenting himself as the PDT's candidate for governor in the 1994 elections, being defeated by Marcello Alencar (PSDB). After being reelected for mayor in 1996, he was eventually elected Governor of Rio de Janeiro State in 1998, for the 1999–2002 term of office, posing himself as the "crown prince" for Brizola, who had already entered a process of political decay and loss of charisma and personal influence.

== Governor of Rio de Janeiro State ==
At the time already a conservative described by an American historian as a "responsible young man" with whom President Fernando Henrique Cardoso "could work" as governor, Garotinho nevertheless targeted the poor by providing subsidized meals for R$1.00 (at the time equivalent to US$0.30) at "people's restaurants" (soup kitchens kept by private contractors), building 35,000 affordable homes and giving, - since 1999 - badly-off families a monthly "citizen's check" (actually, a R$100.00 coupon that could be used to purchase food and personal hygiene items at stores) - eligibility to whom was decided by a network of 807 religious organizations, mostly (82%) of them evangelical, specially from the Assembleias de Deus movement. At the same time, he balanced the State budget and renegotiated Rio's public debts. He won high approval ratings, but his time in office was also marked by serious corruption allegations.

From what he presented as his miraculous conversion to Protestantism in 1994, Garotinho, although not himself a Pentecostal - he is member of a Presbyterian Church - came to stand as a spearhead of the constantly growing involvement of the Pentecostal Churches in Brazilian politics, as well as of their bid for the Federal Executive itself. Given the notorious ties between Pentecostalism and the urban unorganized poor - for which a conversion to Pentecostalism tends to stand for a newly found sense of community as well as for an aspiration at upward social mobility - one could say that Garotinho stood for the preferential social connections created by his political mentor Leonel Brizola, differing from him in that he gave such connections a more politically conservative hue, by means of a kind of Right-wing populism in what is seem by many as simply pandering for the bare needs of the poor by means of a shallow philanthropy reduced to the concrete minimum. Others, however, consider that, conversely, one could also say that Garotinho gave evangelical politics a leftist slant, in that his evangelicism is the personal choice of a recent and enthusiastic convert, who therefore acknowledges the most destitute ones by means not only of offering munificence, but of a shared identity.

Early during his gubernatorial term, Garotinho made a try at striking a progressive note on his public security policies, based on a think-tank of social researchers - who ghost-wrote Garotinho's electoral public security programme - led by the university professor of Anthropology and Political Science Luis Eduardo Soares, who was made assistant secretary of public security. Police stations were made Internet-friendly, in what was called a program for "legal (cool) stations" (Programa Delegacia Legal). However, Garotinho eventually dismissed Soares in March 2000, which was seen as a serious setback for upholding human rights, according to Human Rights Watch. Garotinho insisted that Soares' removal was legitimate, but the circumstances suggested that he was removed due to pressure from the Rio police, with whose corrupt and violent elements Soares had been coming increasingly into conflict. Due to allegedly threats received by him and his family, Soares went abroad for a time, becoming a "neoexile".

== State secretary for Public Security ==
He moved to the Brazilian Socialist Party (PSB) due to problems with the PDT leader, Leonel Brizola, and was the party's presidential candidate at the October 2002 presidential elections. Garotinho had stepped down nine months earlier to run for president and received 18% of the votes cast. He backed Luiz Inácio Lula da Silva in the second round. He helped his wife Rosinha Matheus re-election campaign for governor of the state of Rio de Janeiro. She appointed Garotinho State secretary for Public Security.

In August 2003 he left the PSB to join the historical Party of the Brazilian Democratic Movement (PMDB), which supported President Lula. The move was seen as an attempt to secure federal funding for his wife's tenure as governor of the State of Rio de Janeiro and to increase Garotinho's chances in a future run for President of Brazil.

== Hunger strike and later setbacks ==
As the 2006 presidential elections approached, Garotinho, intent on maintaining a candidacy that his party tended to turn down for supporting Lula's bid for reelection, announced on May 1, 2006 a hunger strike, allegedly in protest of what he called unjust treatment by the Brazilian media, after unanswered accusations of illegal campaign funding - mostly about his wife's spending of some R$120 million in contracts with various shadowy NGOs for providing undelivered services to the State's government, which the media saw as a way to divert funds to an electoral campaign. He later stopped his hunger strike, leaving charges unanswered- and his presidential candidacy turned down. The Brazilian press writing Garotinho off as a "clown" and a failing politician parading himself as a caricature of "a crucified Jesus Christ". Many satirists declared that they supported Garotinho going on with the strike "to the very end".

On May 29, 2008 the Brazilian Federal Police issued an arrest warrant against Garotinho for "mobstering" (formação de quadrilha) for his association to Rio's former plainsclothes (civil) police chief Alvaro Lins, now a Congressperson for Rio de Janeiro, who was charged with money laundering, criminal association, corruption and facilitating smuggling. According to the federal attorney's office, Garotinho had "offered political support for Lins' group to remain in charge of the civil police."

In May 2010, the State (Regional) Electoral Court rendered Garotinho and his wife Rosinha ineligible to run for public office for three years from 2008 on, for engaging in electoral corruption during the 2008 mayoral elections in Campos, where Garotinho had canvassed for votes for his wife, who was running for mayor. Such a condemnation by a collegiate court would have rendered Garotinho ineligible for the ensuing 2010 national election, but the Federal Electoral Court decided to grant him the right to run for the Federal Legislative on the Partido da República ticket, pending an appeal.

In June 2014, Garotinho announced his support for incumbent President Dilma Rousseff in the 2014 Brazilian presidential election. He ran for Governor of Rio de Janeiro in the 2014 state elections, receiving 1.576.511 votes (19,73% of valid votes), finishing in third place, after Luiz Fernando Pezão and Marcelo Crivella, who disputed the run-off.
