= PROSE Awards =

Professional and Scholarly Excellence awards

- Awarded for: '...the very best in professional and scholarly publishing.'
- Country: United States
- Presented by: The Professional and Scholarly Publishing Division of the Association of American Publishers
- First award: 1976
- Website: http://proseawards.com/index.html

The PROSE Awards (where PROSE is an abbreviation for "professional and scholarly excellence") are presented by the Association of American Publishers' (AAP) Professional and Scholarly Publishing (PSP) Division.

Presented since 1976, the awards annually recognize distinguished professional and scholarly books, reference works, journals, and electronic content. The awards are judged by peer publishers, academics, librarians, and medical professionals. Publishers and authors are honored at a luncheon ceremony at the PSP Annual Conference in Washington, DC.

In recent years, the PROSE Awards luncheon has featured a live webcast of the event, original short films and several multimedia presentations highlighting winners.

Awards by the numbers:

- Five “best of” awards chosen from 53 book, reference, journal and e-product categories;
- Forty-five book subject categories for traditional print, electronic publications and print/electronic packages; and
- Six awards for electronic products, including electronic platforms and e-products with multiple components.

== Categories ==
Book subject categories:

- Humanities
  - Archeology and Ancient History
  - Art Exhibitions
  - Art History and Criticism
  - Biography and Autobiography
  - Classics
  - European and World History
  - Language and Linguistics
  - Literature
  - Media and Cultural Studies
  - Music and the Performing Arts
  - Outstanding Scholarly Work by a Trade Publisher
  - Philosophy
  - Textbook/Humanities
  - Theology and Religious Studies
  - U.S. History
- Biological and Life Sciences
  - Biological Sciences
  - Biomedicine and Neuroscience
  - Clinical Medicine
  - Nursing and Allied Health Sciences
  - Textbook/Biological and Life Sciences
- Social Sciences
  - Anthropology
  - Architecture and Urban Planning
  - Business, Finance and Management
  - Economics
  - Education Practice
  - Education Theory
  - Government and Politics
  - Law and Legal Studies
  - Psychology
  - Sociology and Social Work
  - Textbook/Social Sciences
- Physical Sciences & Mathematics
  - Chemistry and Physics
  - Computing and Information Sciences
  - Cosmology and Astronomy
  - Earth Science
  - Engineering and Technology
  - Environmental Science
  - History of Science, Medicine and Technology
  - Mathematics
  - Popular Science and Popular Mathematics
  - Textbook/Physical Sciences and Mathematics
- Reference Works
  - Multivolume Reference/Humanities and Social Sciences
  - Multivolume Reference/Science
  - Single Volume Reference/ Humanities and Social Sciences
  - Single Volume Reference/Science

Electronic publication categories – For electronic products, including electronic platforms and e-products with multiple components. Electronic platforms and products are recognized in the following six categories:

- Best in Biological and Life Sciences
- Best in Humanities
- Best Multidiscipline Platform
- Best in Physical Sciences and Mathematics
- Best in Social Sciences
- Innovation in ePublishing (Discretionary)

Journals categories – For print and electronic journals.

- Best New Journal in Science, Technology and Medicine
- Best New Journal in Social Sciences and Humanities

The PROSE Awards for Excellence – Chosen from among the winners of the books, eproducts and journals categories. One winner is recognized in each of the following categories:

- Award for Excellence in Biology and Life Sciences
- Award for Excellence in Humanities
- Award for Excellence in Physical Sciences and Mathematics
- Award for Excellence in Reference Works
- Award for Excellence in Social Sciences

== The R.R. Hawkins Award ==
The R. R. Hawkins Award has been presented to the most outstanding work among each year’s PROSE Awards entries since they began in 1976.

Year	Award	Publisher	Book / Journal / eProduct
2021	R.R. Hawkins Award	Cambridge University Press	Ancient Maya Politics: A Political Anthropology of the Classic Period 150-900 CE
2020	R.R. Hawkins Award	Yale University Press	Leonardo da Vinci Rediscovered
2019	R.R. Hawkins Award	Oxford University Press	Cyberwar: How Russian Hackers and Trolls Helped Elect a President
2018	R.R. Hawkins Award	Bloomsbury Publishing	Arcadian Library Online
2017	R.R. Hawkins Award	Yale University Press	Reformations: The Early Modern World, 1450-1650
2016	R.R. Hawkins Award	University of California Press	The Scholar Denied: W.E.B. Du Bois and the Birth of Modern Sociology
2015	R.R. Hawkins Award	The Belknap Press of Harvard University Press	Capital in the Twenty-First Century
2013	R.R. Hawkins Award	Elsevier Science	Alan Turing: His Work and Impact
2012	R.R. Hawkins Award	Princeton University Press	Through the Eye of a Needle: Wealth, the Fall of Rome, and the Making of Christianity in the West, 350–550 AD
2011	R.R. Hawkins Award	McGraw-Hill Professional	The Diffusion Handbook: Applied Solutions for Engineers
2010	R.R. Hawkins Award	Yale University Press	Atlas of the Transatlantic Slave Trade
2009a	R.R. Hawkins Award	John Wiley & Sons, Inc.	Wiley Interdisciplinary Reviews (WIREs)
2009b	R.R. Hawkins Award	The University of Chicago Press	Plato’s Philosophers: The Coherence of the Dialogues
2008	R.R. Hawkins Award	Harvard University Press	The Race Between Education & Technology
2007	R.R. Hawkins Award	Princeton University Press	The Dream of the Poem
2006	R.R. Hawkins Award	Harvard University Press	Evolutionary Dynamics
2005	R.R. Hawkins Award	Elsevier	Atlas of Clinical Gross Anatomy

== Other awards ==
Year	Award	Publisher	Book / Journal / eProduct
2016	Award for Excellence in Humanities	Cambridge University Press	The Roman Forum: A Reconstruction and Architectural Guide
2016	Award for Excellence in Humanities	Harvard University Press	Unflattening
2016	Award for Excellence in Physical Sciences and Mathematics	Princeton University Press	The Collected Papers of Albert Einstein: Digital Edition
2016	Award for Excellence in Social Sciences	University of California Press	The Scholar Denied: W.E.B. Du Bois and the Birth of Modern Sociology
2016	Award for Excellence in Biological and Life Sciences	The MIT Press	Principles of Neural Design
2016	Award for Excellence in Reference Works	Elsevier/Academic Press	International Encyclopedia of the Social and Behavioral Sciences
2015	Award for Excellence in Humanities	Cambridge University Press	The Material Life of Roman Slaves
2015	Award for Excellence in Physical Sciences and Mathematics	Cambridge University Press	Atlas of Meteorites
2015	Award for Excellence in Social Sciences	The Belknap Press of Harvard University Press	Capital in the Twenty-First Century
2015	Award for Excellence in Biological and Life Sciences	John Wiley and Sons	Ultrastructure Atlas of Human Tissues
2015	Award for Excellence in Reference Works	Cambridge University Press	The Cambridge History of the First World War
2013	Award for Excellence in Humanities	HarperCollins Publishers	Kansas City Lightning: The Rise and Times of Charlie Parker
2013	Award for Excellence in Physical Sciences and Mathematics	Elsevier Science	Alan Turing: His Work and Impact
2013	Award for Excellence in Social Sciences	Cambridge University Press	The Body in History: Europe from the Paleolithic to the Future
2013	Award for Excellence in Biological and Life Sciences	The MIT Press	The Neural Basis of Free Will: Criteria Causation
2013	Award for Excellence in Reference Works	Elsevier/Academic Press	Epigenetic Regulation in the Nervous System: Basic Mechanisms and Clinical Impact
2012	Award for Excellence in Humanities	Princeton University Press	Through the Eye of a Needle: Wealth, the Fall of Rome, and the Making of Christianity in the West, 350–550 AD
2012	Award for Excellence in Physical Sciences and Mathematics	University of California Press	Atlas of Yellowstone
2012	Award for Excellence in Social Sciences	Princeton University Press	The Unheavenly Chorus: Unequal Political Voice and the Broken Promise of American Democracy
2012	Award for Excellence in Biological and Life Sciences	Harvard University Press	Arthropod Brains: Evolution, Functional Elegance, and Historical Significance
2012	Award for Excellence in Reference Works	Cambridge University Press	The Cambridge History of Religions in America
2011	Award for Excellence in Humanities	Cambridge University Press	Byzantium in the Iconoclast Era, c. 680–850: A History
2011	Award for Excellence in Social Sciences	Yale University Press	Representing Justice: Invention, Controversy, and Rights in City-States and Democratic Courtrooms
2011	Award for Excellence in Physical Sciences & Mathematics	McGraw-Hill Professional	The Diffusion Handbook: Applied Solutions for Engineers
2011	Award for Excellence in Biological & Life Sciences	Princeton University Press	Braintrust: What Neuroscience Tells Us about Morality
2011	Award for Excellence in Reference Works	Princeton University Press	The Crossley ID Guide: Eastern Birds
2010	Award for Excellence in Humanities	University of California Press	Autobiography of Mark Twain
2010	Award for Excellence in Social Sciences	Oxford University Press	Favela: Four Decades of Living on the Edge in Rio de Janeiro
2010	Award for Excellence in Physical Sciences & Mathematics	John Wiley & Sons, Inc.	Life in the World’s Oceans: Diversity, Distribution, and Abundance
2010	Award for Excellence in Biological & Life Sciences	Cell Press	Article of the Future
2010	Award for Excellence in Reference Works	Yale University Press	Atlas of the Transatlantic Slave Trade
