= Favela: Four Decades of Living on the Edge in Rio de Janeiro =

- Author: Janice E. Perlman
- Language: English
- Publisher: Oxford University Press
- Publication date: 2010
- Publication place: United States
- Media type: Print
- Pages: 412
- ISBN: 978-0-19-536836-9

Favela: Four Decades of Living on the Edge in Rio de Janeiro is a book by Janice Perlman published by Oxford University Press in 2010. It primarily documents the experiences and history relayed through conversation by locals to Perlman during her time living in the informal settlements surrounding Rio de Janeiro. The author also provides her own interpretation of social relations within these communities.

== Synopsis ==
Favela is a sequel to The Myth of Marginality (1976) as Perlman attempts to retrace the steps she took while living among favela residents between 1968 and 1969. She relates developments in Rio de Janeiro including the loteamentos, a vast community of squatter plots on the western outskirts of the city; and the conjuntos, characterized as cement apartment complexes built by the government to accommodate evicted favela inhabitants. She describes her experiences revisiting the communities and individuals she had come to know previously, addressing specifically how conditions in the neighborhoods have changed over the past 40 years. She is only able to locate and contact 41 percent of the 750 respondents to the original study, and one of the three favelas, Catacumba, has been entirely demolished.

Perlman then presents a list of ten central factors, which she believes to be the largest contributors to the high rates of violent crime in Rio de Janeiro based on her personal observations. These can be collectively summarized as the confluence of endemic structural inequality, a lucrative drug market, vigilantism, divisive media outlets, and a corrupt police force. Perlman exclaims that together, these harmful actors wage a "war against the poor" through their lack of concern for those caught in the crossfire of the conflict between them. Perlman finds that since the period of military dictatorship, interviewees' belief in the importance and validity of their own civic engagement has grown exponentially; however, faith in government has declined at roughly the same rate. Moreover, actual reported civic engagement has remained comparatively unchanged over the 40-year period.

== Critical reception ==
Writing for the May–June 2010 issue of Foreign Affairs, Richard Feinberg stated that Perlman wrote "with compassion, artistry, and intelligence, using stirring personal stories to illustrate larger points substantiated with statistical analysis." The book was also praised in the journal Social Forces, where Alessandro Angelini called it an "invaluable achievement" that had earned its popularity among scholars of urban issues, although Angelini also criticized Perlman's approach, for example her failure to quantify political and social activism among young people on criteria other than voter registration and formal organizational membership.
