= List of presidents of Petrobras =

President of Petrobras
- Presidente da Petrobras
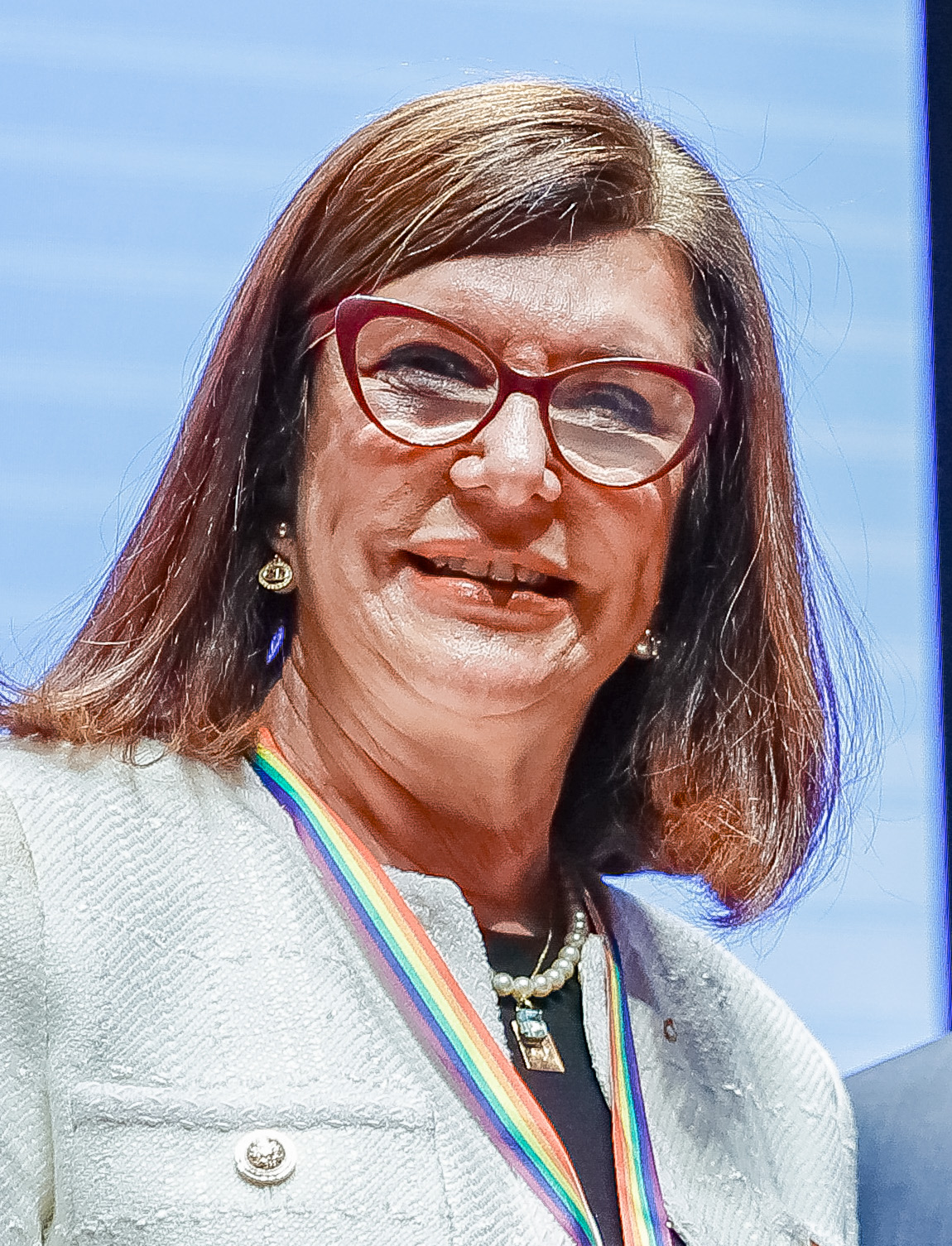
- Incumbent; Magda Chambriard since 24 May 2024
- Style: Madam President
- Type: State-owned enterprise
- Reports to: President; Minister of Mines and Energy
- Seat: Edise, Petrobras Headquarters; Rio de Janeiro, Brazil
- Appointer: President of Brazil; with Petrobras shareholders council approval
- Formation: 2 April 1954; 72 years ago
- First holder: Juracy Magalhães
- Salary: R$ 127,269.71 annually
- Website: www.petrobras.com.br

This is a list of presidents of the Brazilian petroleum company Petróleo Brasileiro S.A. (Petrobras).

Presidents of the company are appointed by the Federal Government, represented by the President of Brazil. The Federal Government is the main shareholder and the name of the president must be approved by the common shareholders assembly and, as the Government has a majority in the council, its appointment is always the winner.

== List of presidents ==
No.	Portrait	President	Took office	Left office	Time in office	Appointer
1	Juracy Magalhães	Juracy Magalhães (1905–2001)	2 April 1954	2 September 1954	153 days	Getúlio Vargas (PTB)
2	Artur Levy	Artur Levy (1902–1993)	11 September 1954	1 February 1956	1 year, 143 days	Café Filho (PSP)
3	Janary Gentil Nunes	Janary Gentil Nunes (1912–1984)	3 February 1956	9 December 1958	2 years, 309 days	Juscelino Kubitschek (PSD)
4	Idálio Sardenberg	Idálio Sardenberg (1906–1987)	11 December 1958	2 February 1961	2 years, 53 days	Juscelino Kubitschek (PSD)
5	Geonísio Carvalho Barroso	Geonísio Carvalho Barroso	20 February 1961	5 January 1962	319 days	Jânio Quadros (PTN)
6	Francisco Mangabeira	Francisco Mangabeira (1909–1993)	17 January 1962	6 June 1963	1 year, 140 days	João Goulart (PTB)
7	Albino Silva	Albino Silva (1909–1976)	11 June 1963	28 January 1964	231 days	João Goulart (PTB)
8	Osvino Ferreira Alves	Osvino Ferreira Alves (1897–1981)	28 January 1964	3 April 1964	66 days	João Goulart (PTB)
9	Ademar de Queirós	Ademar de Queirós (1899–1984)	7 April 1964	30 June 1966	2 years, 84 days	Ranieri Mazzilli (PSD)
10	Irnack Carvalho do Amaral	Irnack Carvalho do Amaral (1905–1983)	30 June 1966	27 March 1967	270 days	Castelo Branco (ARENA)
11	Arthur Duarte Candal da Fonseca	Arthur Duarte Candal da Fonseca (1909–2007)	27 March 1967	24 March 1969	1 year, 362 days	Costa e Silva (ARENA)
12	Waldemar Levy Cardoso	Waldemar Levy Cardoso (1900–2009)	28 March 1969	30 October 1969	216 days	Costa e Silva (ARENA)
13	Ernesto Geisel	Ernesto Geisel (1907–1996)	6 November 1969	6 July 1973	3 years, 242 days	Emílio Garrastazu Médici (ARENA)
14	Floriano Peixoto Faria Lima	Floriano Peixoto Faria Lima (1917–2011)	17 July 1973	1 October 1974	1 year, 76 days	Emílio Garrastazu Médici (ARENA)
15	Araken de Oliveira	Araken de Oliveira (1909–2002)	3 October 1974	15 March 1979	4 years, 163 days	Ernesto Geisel (ARENA)
16	Shigeaki Ueki	Shigeaki Ueki (born 1935)	26 March 1979	28 August 1984	5 years, 155 days	João Figueiredo (ARENA)
17	Thelmo Dutra de Rezende	Thelmo Dutra de Rezende (born 1924)	28 August 1984	19 March 1985	203 days	João Figueiredo (PDS)
18	Hélio Beltrão	Hélio Beltrão (1916–1997)	19 March 1985	15 May 1986	1 year, 57 days	José Sarney (MDB)
19	Ozires Silva	Ozires Silva (born 1931)	19 May 1986	21 June 1988	2 years, 33 days	José Sarney (MDB)
20	Armando Guedes Coelho	Armando Guedes Coelho	21 June 1988	23 January 1989	216 days	José Sarney (MDB)
21	Orlando Galvão Filho	Orlando Galvão Filho	23 January 1989	19 April 1989	86 days	José Sarney (MDB)
22	Carlos Sant'Anna	Carlos Sant'Anna	19 April 1989	23 March 1990	338 days	José Sarney (MDB)
23	Luís Octavio Carvalho	Luís Octavio Carvalho (born 1950)	23 March 1990	19 October 1990	210 days	Fernando Collor (PRN)
24	Eduardo de Freitas Teixeira	Eduardo de Freitas Teixeira (born 1954)	19 October 1990	27 March 1991	159 days	Fernando Collor (PRN)
25	Alfeu de Melo Valença	Alfeu de Melo Valença (born 1944)	2 April 1991	21 August 1991	141 days	Fernando Collor (PRN)
26	Ernesto Weber	Ernesto Weber (born 1937)	21 August 1991	4 May 1992	257 days	Fernando Collor (PRN)
27	Benedictor Fonseca Moreira	Benedictor Fonseca Moreira (1930–2021)	4 May 1992	18 November 1992	198 days	Fernando Collor (PRN)
28	Joel Mendes Rennó	Joel Mendes Rennó (born 1938)	18 November 1992	8 March 1999	6 years, 110 days	Itamar Franco (MDB)
29	José Coutinho Barbosa	José Coutinho Barbosa	8 March 1999	24 March 1999	16 days	Fernando Henrique Cardoso (PSDB)
30	Henri Philippe Reichstul	Henri Philippe Reichstul (born 1949)	24 March 1999	21 December 2001	2 years, 272 days	Fernando Henrique Cardoso (PSDB)
31	Francisco Gros	Francisco Gros (1942–2010)	2 January 2002	2 January 2003	1 year, 0 days	Fernando Henrique Cardoso (PSDB)
32	José Eduardo Dutra	José Eduardo Dutra (1957–2015)	2 January 2003	22 July 2005	2 years, 201 days	Luiz Inácio Lula da Silva (PT)
33	Sérgio Gabrielli	Sérgio Gabrielli (born 1949)	22 July 2005	13 February 2012	6 years, 206 days	Luiz Inácio Lula da Silva (PT)
34	Graça Foster	Graça Foster (born 1953)	13 February 2012	4 February 2015	2 years, 356 days	Dilma Rousseff (PT)
35	Aldemir Bendine	Aldemir Bendine (born 1963)	6 February 2015	30 May 2016	1 year, 114 days	Dilma Rousseff (PT)
36	Pedro Parente	Pedro Parente (born 1953)	30 May 2016	1 June 2018	2 years, 2 days	Michel Temer (MDB)
37	Ivan Monteiro	Ivan Monteiro (born 1960)	1 June 2018	3 January 2019	216 days	Michel Temer (MDB)
38	Roberto Castello Branco	Roberto Castello Branco	3 January 2019	13 April 2021	2 years, 100 days	Jair Bolsonaro (PSL)
39	Joaquim Silva e Luna	Joaquim Silva e Luna (born 1949)	16 April 2021	13 April 2022	362 days	Jair Bolsonaro (Ind)
40	José Mauro Ferreira Coelho	José Mauro Ferreira Coelho (born 1964)	14 April 2022	20 June 2022	67 days	Jair Bolsonaro (PL)
41	Caio Mario Paes de Andrade	Caio Mario Paes de Andrade (born 1974)	28 June 2022	4 January 2023	190 days	Jair Bolsonaro (PL)
42	Jean Paul Prates	Jean Paul Prates (born 1968)	26 January 2023	14 May 2024	1 year, 109 days	Luiz Inácio Lula da Silva (PT)
–	Clarice Coppetti	Clarice Coppetti; Acting	14 May 2024	24 May 2024	10 days	–
43	Magda Chambriard	Magda Chambriard (born 1957)	24 May 2024	Incumbent	2 years, 182 days	Luiz Inácio Lula da Silva (PT)
