= Theodorico Netto =

Brazilian politician and businessman

Senator for Rio Grande do Norte
- In office 25 January 2023 – 1 February 2023
- Preceded by: Jean Paul Prates
- Succeeded by: Rogério Simonetti Marinho

Mayor of Tangará
- In office 1 January 1989 – 31 December 1992
- Preceded by: Israel Alves Carneiro
- Succeeded by: Murilo Cavalcanti Cabral

Personal details
- Born: Theodorico Bezerra Netto; 29 July 1961 (age 63); Santa Cruz, Rio Grande do Norte, Brazil
- Political party: PSDB (2005–2010); MDB (2010–2013); PCDoB (2013–present)

Theodorico Bezerra Netto (born 29 July 1961) is a Brazilian businessman and politician, affiliated with the Communist Party of Brazil (PCdoB). He briefly served as one of the senators from the state of Rio Grande do Norte, serving only 5 days. He held the position due to the previous senator, Jean Paul Prates, taking up a role in the Lula administration as the head of Petrobras. Theodorico Netto was succeeded by Rogério Simonetti Marinho, who had been elected to the position in 2022. Prior to being senator, he had been the mayor of the town of Tangará from 1989 to 1992.
