= 2018 Brazil truck drivers' strike =

Strike involving truck drivers throughout Brazil in 2018

2018 truck drivers' strike
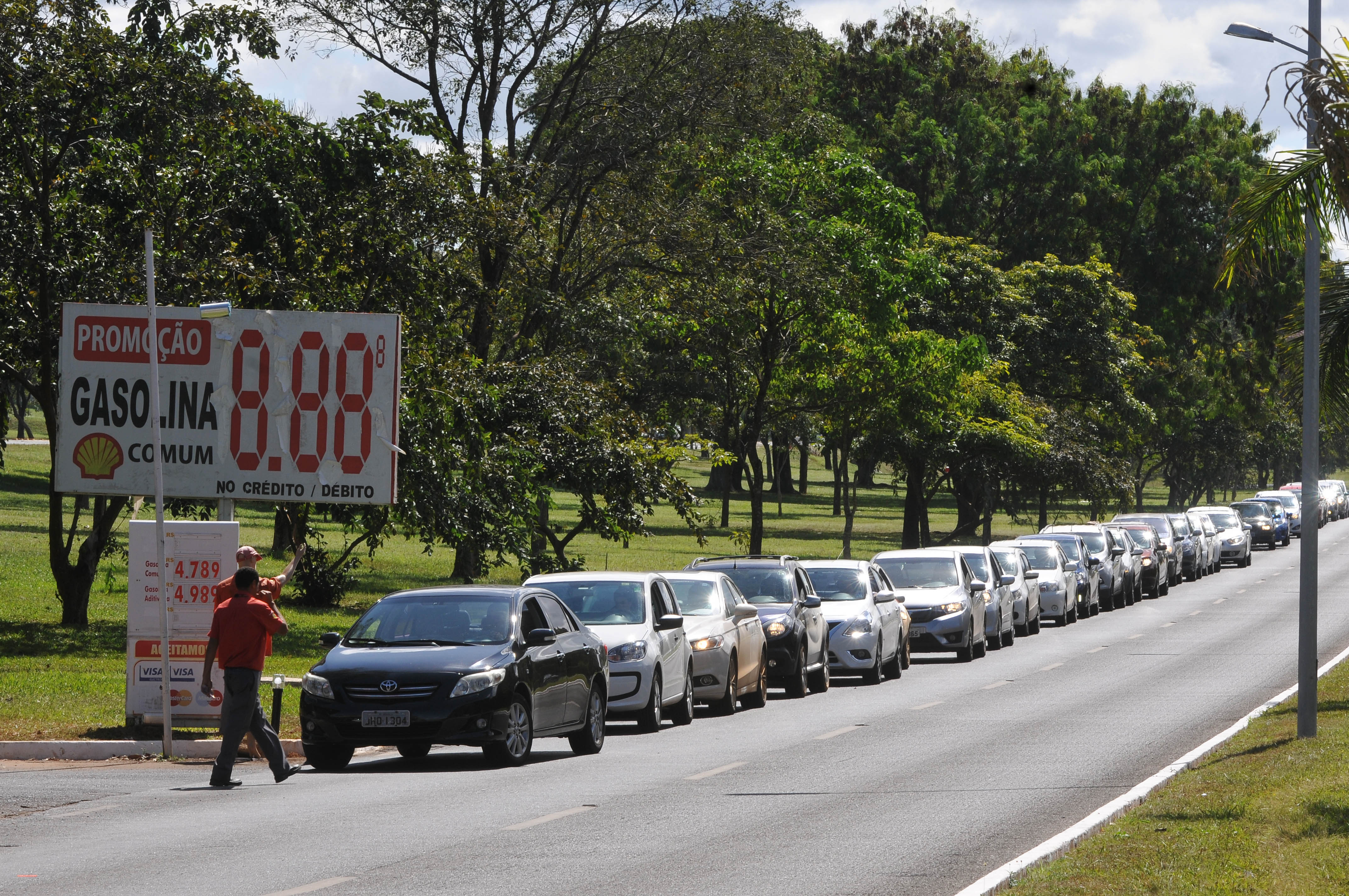
- Line for refueling at a gas station in Brasília
- Date: 21 May 2018 – 1 June
- Location: All Brazilian states and the Federal District
- Caused by: Increases to the price of diesel fuel
- Goals: Reduction of the price of diesel fuel; Truckers' exemption from tolls (trucks with suspended axels); Enaction of the law 528 of 2015; Creation of a trucker regulation
- Methods: Strike action, roadblock
- Status: Strike ended: Most demonstrations ended by June 1; Distribution of food, medicine, and fuel normalized after the strike

Parties
- Truckers and oil workers
- Confederação Nacional dos Transportadores Autônomos (CNTA)
- Associação Brasileira dos Caminhoneiros (Abcam)
- União Nacional dos Caminhoneiros do Brasil (Unicam)

The 2018 Brazil truck drivers' strike, also called the diesel crisis, was allegedly a strike of self-employed truck drivers but with ample support from trucking company owners that began on 21 May 2018.

The protesters demanded a decrease of the price of diesel, exemption from certain tolls, as well as a legal and tax reform related to truck driving. Oil prices increased in Brazil after a 2016 policy change that made oil prices float with international prices.

The nationwide paralysis of roads caused a shortage of food, medicines, and oil across Brazil, with long queues of vehicles to gas stations.

== Background ==
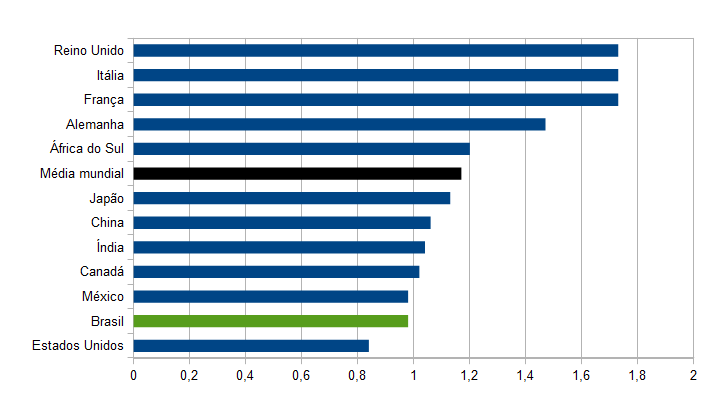
Price of diesel on 21 May 2018, USD per liter

Starting in late 2016, the price of oil in Brazil rose due to the termination of policies coming from Luiz Inácio Lula da Silva and Dilma Rousseff's terms in office. Under Michel Temer's administration, the prior policy of pricing domestically sold oil lower than the international price was changed by the state-owned oil company, Petrobrás, to sell at the international market price. Furthermore, the value of the U.S. dollar relative to the Brazilian real also rose in the weeks before the strike, driving up the domestic cost of oil in the local currency.

On 18 May 2018, truckers and Abcam (Associação Brasileira dos Caminhoneiros, the Brazilian Association of Truckers, which claims to have more than 600,000 members) threatened to strike if the government did not reduce the tax burden on diesel. With no response by the government, the strike began on 21 May.

== Timeline ==
=== 18 to 20 May ===
On 18 May, truckers announced a strike starting on 21 May if the government did not halt increases in diesel prices. The following day, Petrobrás announced a price increase of 0.8% for diesel and 1.34% for gas based on the increase in international oil prices and the company's new policy.

On 20 May, the Federal Justice prohibited any blockade of the federal highways in Paraná. This move was made by the General Counsel for the Federal Government (Advocacia Geral da União) on request of the Federal Highway Police.

=== 21 and 22 May ===
During the first day of the strike, some highways were partially or totally blocked. In some areas, tires were burned by truckers, and in others, the truckers stayed on the roadside. By the end of the evening, president Michel Temer had a meeting with members of his cabinet.

Airports warned of potential future problems with fuel and car companies such as Ford, Chevrolet, and Fiat, who also announced problems related to the strike. In order to deal with the strike, the Minister of Public Security Raul Jungmann announced the creation of a crisis cabinet.

=== 23 and 24 May ===
On 23 May, airports started to suffer a lack of fuel; Infraero announced that airports like Congonhas and Recife International only had fuel to last a day. As a result of trucks halting fuel deliveries to gas stations, food deliveries, markets and other establishments, prices started to rise. In Recife, gasoline reached the price of R$8.99 (approximately US$2.45) and in Rio de Janeiro a bag of potatoes could cost as much as R$500 (approximately US$136.30). The same day, Abcam announced it would let trucks with livestock and medicine pass through the blockades until Friday of the same week (25 May).

Temer asked for a truce for two or three days so the problem could be solved, and Petrobrás announced that it would make diesel 10% cheaper for fifteen days. According to the company's president, Pedro Parente, the measure was taken exceptionally so the government could talk to the truckers during the fifteen days.

One day later, gasoline reached R$10 (approximately US$2.72) in the Federal District. During the same day, fewer buses were in circulation and hospitals started to have small problems due to the lack of fuel and other equipment. The day was mainly marked by the announcement by the Chief of Staff, Eliseu Padilha, that the government had reached an agreement with representatives of the truckers after a six-hour meeting. The agreement involved the strike being suspended for fifteen days. Jungmann said there were indications that the strike was actually a lockout, and that the government would look into the situation.

=== 25 May ===
Despite the announcement of the deal on the previous day, Abcam did not adhere to the agreement and the trucker's strike continued. Airports started to run out of fuel and cancel flights, and federal universities began to suspend classes. The lack of fuel limited the circulation of ambulances in some states and forced the cancellation of non-emergency surgeries in some hospitals in Santa Catarina due to lack of surgical supplies.

Temer criticized the truckers who continued in the strike, calling them part of a "radical minority", and announced he would send troops to end the roadblocks made by the truckers. Meanwhile, the Attorney General of Brazil asked the Supreme Federal Court to declare the strike illegal. The Supreme Federal Court authorized the use of force and imposed a fine on those who refused to end the roadblocks. By the end of the evening, the government claimed to have already removed 45% of all roadblocks.

The cities of São Paulo, Rio de Janeiro, and Porto Alegre, as well as the state of Pernambuco, later declared a state of emergency.

=== 26 and 27 May ===
On Saturday, 26 May, Minister Carlos Marun stated that the government would begin to fine any company that did not obey the agreement in the amount of R$100,000 per hour, and also said that it believes that the event is not a strike but a lockout.

By the end of the afternoon, President Temer asked Henrique Meirelles to discuss measures to contain the strike with a special emphasis on reducing the tax on diesel (PIS/Confins) to zero. A group of autonomous truckers was called by the government to meet later that day.

By the end of the day, Temer made a public pronouncement listing the measures that would be taken, the changes included the reduction of diesel's price by R$0.46 per litre (for 60 days; after that, just monthly adjustments would continue); suspension of taxes on suspended axles on federal highways; the warranty of autonomous truckers earning 30% of Conab (Companhia Nacional de Abastecimento) fare; and the establishment of a minimum shipping table (the last two are provisional measures).

The state of Mato Grosso and the city of Teresina declared states of emergency. Elective surgeries across the state health network of Rio de Janeiro were suspended.

=== 28 May ===
Even after Temer's speech, many truckers continued to protest. Abcam's president, José da Fonseca Lopes, said that the truckers wanted to get back to work, and although the government gave them what they wanted, the strike had not stopped yet because "a group of interventionists want to overthrow the government." Unicam's president, José Araujo Silva, said many truck drivers still did not know about the deal, but were being informed so they could stop the strike. Gilson Baitaca, a member of the Movement of Grain Transporters of Mato Grosso, said that truckers who were connected to his movement would start unblocking the roads, but some autonomous drivers want other things. Cláudio Ferreira of Fetrabens said he would meet with the governor of São Paulo to discuss a way to anticipate the end of the strike in the state. The National Federation of Transport (CNT) reported that they believe the truckers' goals were achieved and that they should now go back to work. CNTA allowed its unions to decide whether the strike should continue or if it should stop. They oriented those who plan to continue to let fuel, milk, food going to schools, products going to hospitals and trucks with the civil defense sticker to pass.

Ibovespa index fell during the morning, registering a drop of 2.45%, and the dollar rose, reaching R$3.70. Some gas stations in São Paulo refused to accept the supply of fuel due to threats that have been made during the days by supporters of the strike. In some parts of the blockades, some protesters drilled truck tires to prevent the police from forcing them to move away. Abcam's president José da Fonseca Lopes said that the deal with the government have been concluded and that from now on the strike is not a matter of this institution or its autonomous truckers, but a matter of political parties and "people who want to overthrow the government".

At this time there were still 556 active blockades around the country (46% of the original blockades). During this day the biggest registered impacts were on public transportation and schools.

=== 29 May ===
After nine days of blockade, there was still a lack of food supply in hypermarkets of 22 Brazilian state capitals. The hypermarket brand Ceasa was operating with around 80 and 90% of its stores closed. There is also a lack of fuel in gas stations deeply affects 15 state capitals including São Paulo and Rio de Janeiro.

The Federal Police opened 48 inquiries for lockout investigation and arrest requests, but all of them were denied by the court.

At this time there were 3 complete blockades and 616 minor blockades still active, as well as many other parallel manifestations supporting the strike and adding more claims to the overall act. The Federal Highway Police sent to AGU 176 assessments of stopped vehicles on some highways, with fines of R$100,000/hour for companies and R$10,000/day for individuals.

Armed Forces General Staff Admiral Ademir Sobrinho denied any intent of the Brazilian Army on attending demonstrations that ask for military intervention over the state.

=== 30 May ===
A trucker was killed by a protester in Rondônia because he left the blockade. The suspect was later arrested.

Meanwhile, in São Carlos, a TV team was assaulted during coverage of the protests on Anhanguera Highway.

The Supreme Federal Court determined a fine in the total amount of R$141.4 million divided between 96 transport companies. Minister Carlos Marun claimed that the R$0.46 discount on diesel price should be applied on Friday, with the expectation of economic stabilization in seven days. The government estimated a total economic loss of R$75 billion up to this point, with R$2.7 billion for supermarkets, R$11.5 billion for fuel distributors, R$3 billion for agribusiness, R$8 to 10 billion loss for livestock, R$1.8 billion for textile and R$2.5 billion for chemical industries.

=== 31 May ===
The Federal Police "Operation Unlocked", which started a day before, conducted 3 searches and 1 temporary arrest warrants on companies suspected of supporting the strike. Some companies were accused by security minister Raul Jungmann by taking advantage of the strike to pressure the government.

The government claimed that the diesel price reduction would cause R$3.4 billion in expenses, resulting in an increase in taxes on exporters, soft drinks, and chemical industries. The government also warned that some programs would have cuts, including R$368.9 million for transport, R$135 million for SUS (Sistema Único de Saúde), R$55.1 million for education, R$4.1 million for prevention and repression of drug trafficking, and R$1.5 million for the police force.

At this point, the president had proposed three provisional measures:

1) Exempting tolls on trucks with suspended axles

2) Create a reserve for 30% of Conab (Companhia Nacional de Abastecimento) transports to autonomous truckers

3) the setting of a minimum shipping price. Eliseu Padilha, chief of staff of Temer's government, claimed gas stations that refuse to lower the diesel price would be fined up to R$9.4 million.

The ANTT (Agência Nacional de Transporte Terrestre) published a new minimum price table. Elisângela Lopes, the technical advisor for infrastructure and logistics at CNA (Confederação de Agricultura e Pecuária), said it would make the truckers' jobs even more difficult, since compliance requires precise accounting and computer knowledge.

== Oil worker strike ==
During the course of the events concerning the trucker's strike, oil workers at Petrobrás organised themselves in order to conduct another strike, aiming for the resignation of the company's president, Pedro Parente, and the reduction of fuel and cooking gas prices.

- On 27 May 2018, Oil workers started joining the strike and protests. Employees of the refinery "President Getúlio Vargas" in Paraná protested in front of it.
- On 29 May 2018, the Superior Labour Court forbade the promised strike which Petrobrás workers, claiming it is unconstitutional and abusive and defining a fine penalty of R$500,000 per day in case of noncompliance. Those strikers protested for a reduction on fuel and cooking gas prices and the resignation of Petrobrás president, Pedro Parente.
- On 31 May 2018, the Federation of Petroleum Workers (Federação Única dos Petroleiros, FUP) recommended an end to the oil worker's strike after the Supreme Federal Court increased the fine on trade unions.
- On 1 June 2018, Parente resigned after being pressured for his defense of the new price policy since the beginning of his mandate, which had been the target of critics in the last weeks, even inside the government's allied base. He claimed in an open letter that "Just a few could see that it, [the crisis] is the reflection of shocks that reaches global economy, with domestic effects". His resignation surprised ministers and other authorities. Parente said that his leadership had "ceased to be positive".

== Impact/Aftermath ==
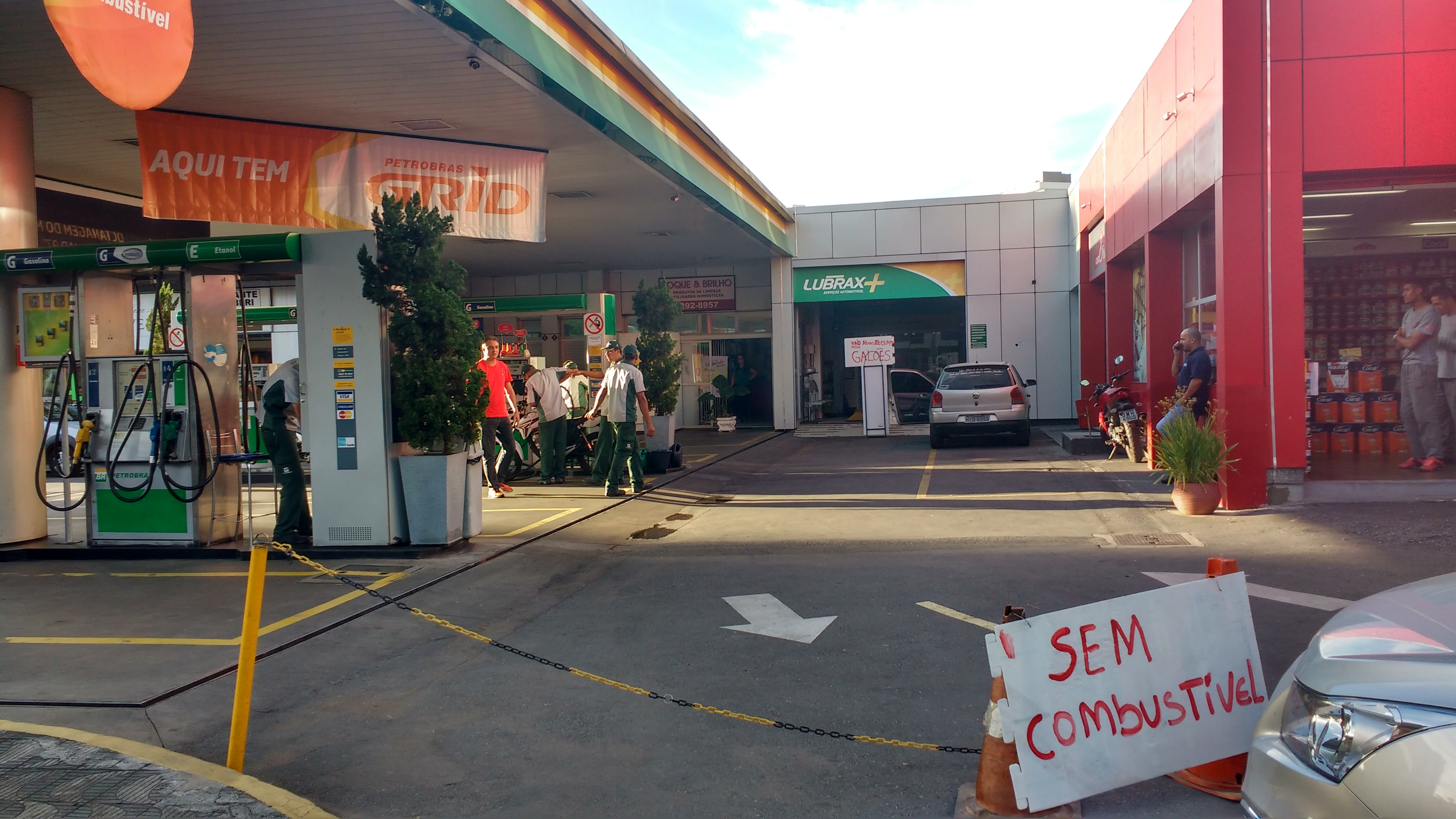
Gas station in Belo Horizonte during the strike, with a sign stating "no fuel".

Paulo Feldman, a University of São Paulo (USP) professor, estimates a loss of at least R$30 billion of economic production caused by the strike over five days. Some of the most notable impacts are:

- 11 airports had their activities halted due to the lack of fuel, and other airports were operating under a critical state, with many cancelled flights.
- Lack of fuel at gas stations all over the country.
- Lack of food distribution in many regions and consequently an increase in food prices. In some cases, stores imposed per buyer limits.
- Many exports from Brazil were impacted due to lack of distribution channels. For instance, the beef industry had estimated losses of R$620 million.
- Suspension of classes in schools and universities and suspension of the second stage of OAB exams.
- Lack of staple products in supermarkets.
- Suspension of some hospital procedures due to lack of medicine.
- Suspension of production in 19 car factories.
- Disposal of milk by some producers due to lack of distribution which lead to spoiling.
- A reduction of service by bus fleets.
- A risk of shortage of drinking water in the Federal District due to the lack of products required for its treatment.
- In the first 5 days of the strikes alone the U.S Department of Agriculture reported that $1.75 billion was lost.
- It took up to 12 days for the cargo deliveries to normalize.

== Statements and reactions ==
A telephone poll of 1500 adults by Datafolha on 30 May reported that 55% of Brazilians reject the privatization of Petrobrás, 74% reject any possible sale to foreign investors and companies, and 87% of the population supports the ongoing strike and are against public budget cuts and rise on taxes to attend their demands. 56% of respondents supported a longer strike.

While there was an overall negative impact on the economy, some people benefited. For example, Uber drivers reported a doubling in their income during the strike.

=== Politicians ===
Several Brazilian politicians, including potential candidates for president in the coming election, commented about the crisis:

- Alvaro Dias supported the strike. According to him, the truckers had a good reason to protest. Dias also stated that the strike could not be ignored and that the protests are the "revolt of a whole nation".
- Ciro Gomes called the rising prices of fuel an aberration and criticized Petrobrás on Twitter.
- Geraldo Alckmin did not explicitly say if he was for the strike or against, but he did try to offer a solution to the problem that caused the strike.
- Guilherme Boulos said that the fuel crisis is a result of Michel Temer's and Petrobrás CEO Pedro Parente's pricing policy at Petrobrás, enacted to make a profit for its shareholders. "A public company should serve the Brazilian people and not give profit to half a dozen shareholders."
- Jair Bolsonaro declared support for the truck drivers but criticized the roadblocks made by them. The deputy also opposed the fines, prisons, and confiscation against the truck drivers and called for the revocation of these penalties if elected.
- João Amoêdo did not explicitly say if he supported the strike or not, but he called for the privatization of Petrobrás, he also suggested spending cuts and tax cuts as solutions to the problem that started the strike.
- Manuela d'Ávila criticized Temer, calling his government illegitimate and saying that it does not have authority against the truckers.
- Marina Silva criticized Temer's government for not preparing for the strike. She also criticized him for sending troops to end blockades, calling that "the action of an incompetent". She also criticized Petrobrás.
- Paulo Rabello de Castro claimed that solving the crisis requires the creation of a stabilization fund managed outside of the government. The BNDES ex-president also supported a tax reform.

=== International ===
- United States: On 24 May, the State Department's mission to Brazil issued a security alert that recommended Americans in Brazil take measures to ensure an adequate stock of water, domestic goods, and fuel. The alert warned that it could take some time for the situation in the country to restabilize. It also recommended a means of checking road conditions online before taking a trip outside of the cities due to the risk of vehicles running out of fuel.
- On 25 May, Amnesty International condemned the use of the army against protesters and truckers, claiming that "the freedom of expression is a human right." The French journal, Le Monde, also criticized this action, claiming that "this crisis exposes the fragility of Michel Temer's government".

== See also ==
- Brazilian economic crisis since 2014
- Michel Temer presidency
- Canada convoy protest
