= Aldemir =

Aldemir may be both a given name and surname. Notable people with the name include:

Given name

- Aldemir Bendine (born 1963), Brazilian chief executive officer (CEO) of Petrobras
- Aldemir da Silva Junior (born 1992), Brazilian sprinter
- Aldemir Martins (1922–2006), Brazilian artist

Surname

- Cüneyt Aldemir (born 1973), Turkish dentist and politician
- Furkan Aldemir (born 1991), Turkish basketball player
- Koray Aldemir (born 1990), German professional poker player of Turkish descent
