= Ivan Monteiro =

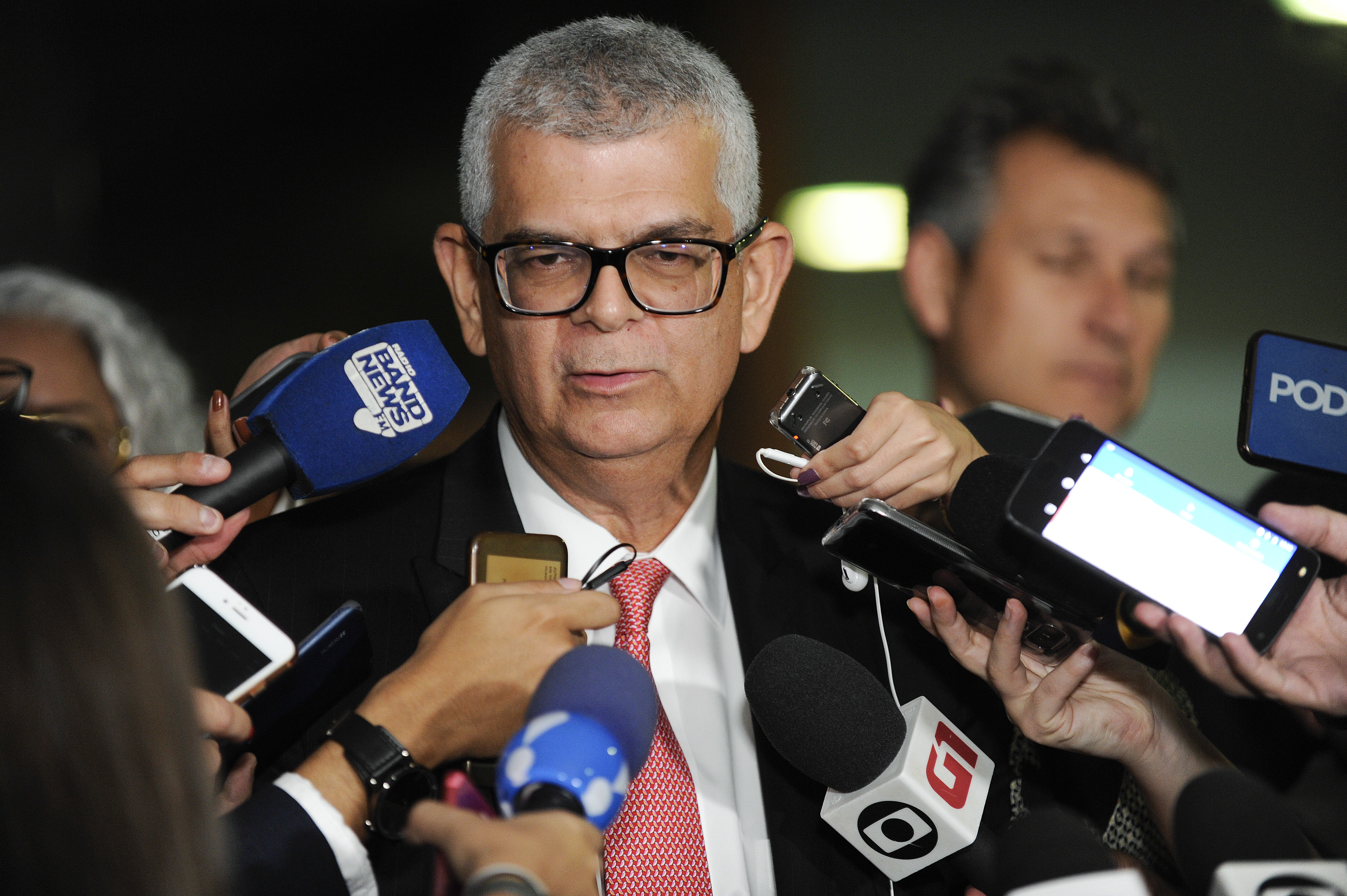

37th President of Petrobras
- In office 1 June 2018 – 3 January 2019
- Nominated by: Michel Temer
- Preceded by: Pedro Parente
- Succeeded by: Roberto Castello Branco

Personal details
- Born: Ivan de Souza Monteiro; 1960 (age 65–66) Manaus, AM, Brazil
- Occupation: Engineer, CEO

Ivan de Souza Monteiro (born 1960, in Manaus) is a Brazilian electronic engineer, former president of the oil state company Petrobras. Previously, Monteiro was CFO of the company. Before heading Petrobras, Monteiro worked in Banco do Brasil.

== Career ==
Monteiro was taken to Petrobras in 2015 by Aldemir Bendine, former president of Banco do Brasil (BB), nominated in that year as president of the company by president Dilma Rousseff. Monteiro had been vice-president of the Financial Management and Affairs with Investors of BB, in office between 2009 and 2015.

In June 2018, after Pedro Parente's departure, Monteiro was chosen by the Petrobras Administration Council as acting president, later nominated by Michel Temer as president.

== See also ==
- Petrobras
- Aldemir Bendine
- Pedro Parente

Business positions
Preceded by Pedro Parente	President of Petrobras; 2018–2019	Succeeded by Roberto Castello Branco
