= Graças Foster =

Brazilian business executive and chemical engineer

Graça Foster
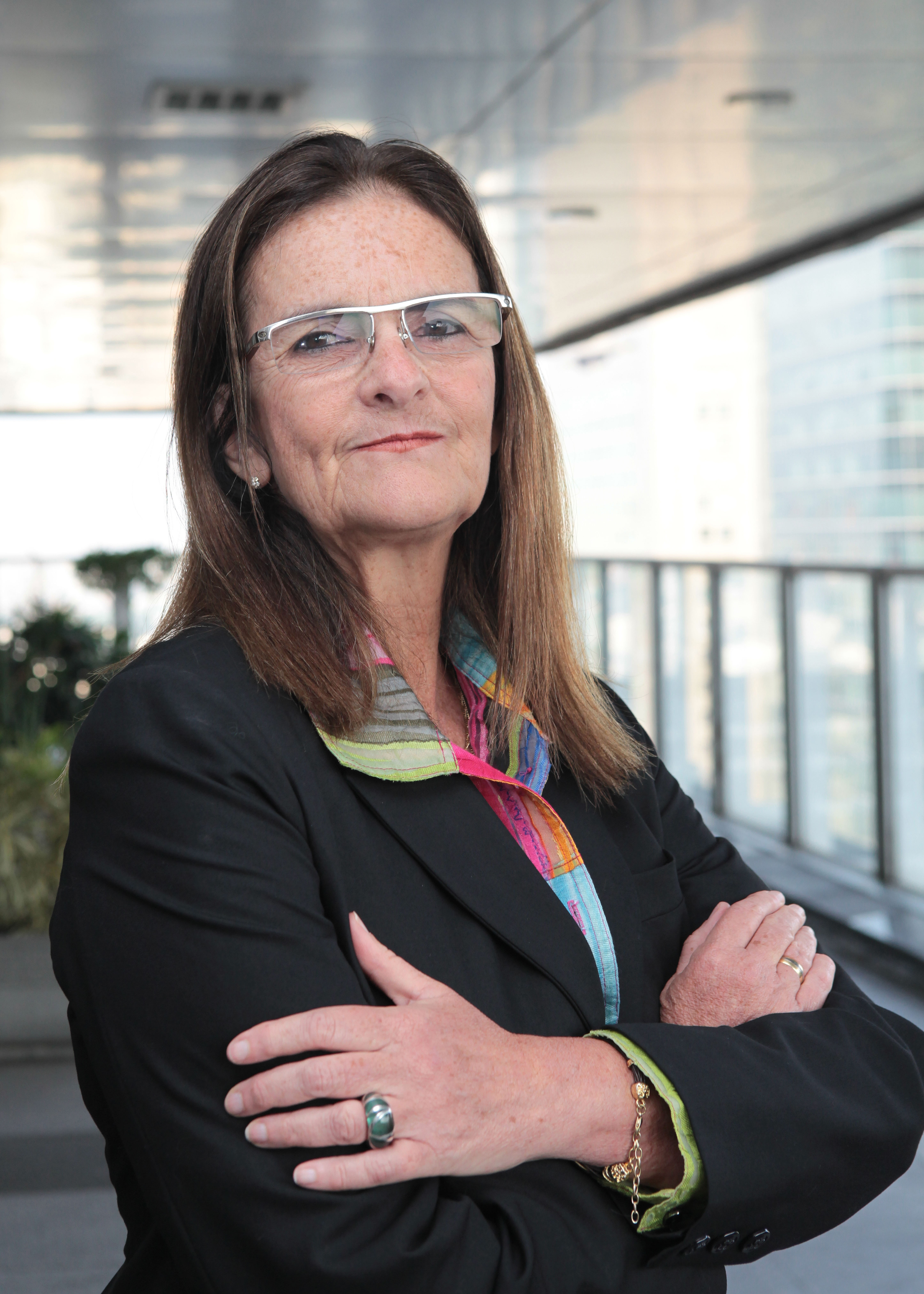

President of Petrobras
- In office 13 February 2012 – 4 February 2015
- Appointed by: Dilma Rousseff
- Preceded by: Sergio Gabrielli
- Succeeded by: Aldemir Bendine

Personal details
- Born: Maria das Graças Silva; 26 August 1953 (age 73) Caratinga, Minas Gerais, Brazil
- Party: PT (2008–present)
- Height: 1.78 m (5 ft 10 in)
- Spouse: Colin Foster (m. 1985)
- Children: Flávia (b. 1975); Colin (b. 1987)
- Education: Fluminense Federal University (BE); Federal University of Rio de Janeiro (ME); Getúlio Vargas Foundation (MBA)
- Known for: Former CEO of Petrobras S.A.
- Other names: The Iron Lady of Oil

Maria das Graças Foster (née Silva;; born 26 August 1953), commonly known as Graça Foster, is a Brazilian business executive and chemical engineer. She was the CEO of Petrobras-Petróleo Brasil, Brazil's state-controlled oil company, which is located in Rio de Janeiro. She was the first woman in the world to head a major oil-and-gas company. In April 2012, she was listed on the Time 100 list of the most influential people in the world. In 2014, she was recognized as the 16th most powerful woman in the world by Forbes magazine. She was ranked by Fortune in 2013 as "the Most Powerful Woman in Business" (outside the U.S.) for the second year in a row.

== Personal background ==
Maria das Graças (née Silva) Foster was born on 26 August 1953, in Caratinga, Minas Gerais in southeastern Brazil. By the time she was two years old, Foster's family moved from Caratinga to a favela, also known as a shanty town community, outside of Rio de Janeiro. The area, known as Complexo do Alemão was extremely poverty stricken and ridden with crime. Overpopulation, drug trafficking, unsanitary conditions, malnutrition, pollution, and diseases, along with high mortality rates remain widespread in the poorer favela communities. The conditions in Complexo do Alemão necessitated consistent occupation and monitoring by Brazilian security forces.

Foster credits her success and motivation to excel to the support she has received from her mother, yet characterizes her childhood as "happy, joyful but very difficult". In an interview with O Globo, she said, "I lived in the Complexo do Alemão for 12 years, lived with domestic violence in childhood and faced difficulties in life. I have always worked to help support my mother and my children and pay for my studies. Willpower is everything for me. I was never afraid of work." She never knew if she would be able to continue going to school. In order to pay for her school books, she often collected recyclable trash that had been dumped in the streets. During this time, her neighbors were immigrants from Portugal, who would occasionally call on Foster for assistance. In exchange for extra money, she would often help them with reading and writing letters and acclimating to the Brazilian culture.

Foster continues to live in an apartment in Rio de Janeiro's Copacabana neighborhood and is known to travel by local transportation, such as taxis.

She has been at the center of corruption accusations at Petrobras. Petrobras said in a statement on its website that Foster was out as CEO.

== Educational background ==
She attended the Fluminense Federal University, graduating in 1978 with a Bachelor's degree in chemical engineering. In 1979, she began postgraduate studies, earning a master's degree in nuclear engineering from the Federal University of Rio de Janeiro. In 1999, she earned her MBA from the Getulio Vargas Foundation.

== Professional background ==
Foster joined Petrobras as an intern in 1978, utilizing her master's degree in chemical engineering. She was hired as a chemical engineer in 1981 and went on to serve in managerial roles in the Gas and Energy Business Unit and at the Leopoldo Miguez de Mello Research and Development Center, as well as the Transportadora Brasileira do Gasoduto Bolivia-Brasil.

In 1998, Foster was working for a Petrobras unit that was involved importing natural gas from Bolivia. During this time, she met Dilma Rousseff, who in October 2010, would be elected to serve as the first female President of Brazil. In 1998, Rousseff was a relatively unknown energy official, serving in Rio Grande do Sul in southern Brazil. Foster and Rousseff developed a lifelong professional relationship, based in their mutual support of the leftist Workers Party, which rose to power in 2002, resulting in the election of Luiz Inácio Lula da Silva as the President of Brazil. At this time, Rousseff was named the head of the board of directors of Petrobras, serving for seven years during the administration of da Silva.

When da Silva appointed Rousseff to serve as Brazil's energy minister, Rousseff appointed Foster as one of her top aides in the national capital of Brasília. In this capacity, Foster functioned as both the Executive Secretary of the Federal Government Program for Mobilizing Brazil's Oil and Gas Industry (PROMINP), and the Interministerial Coordinator for the National Program for Biodiesel Production and Use. She continued serving in these roles for two years, after which she return to Petrobras. As colleagues, Foster and Rousseff continued to research, network with individuals and organizations, and cultivate international partnerships in an effort to develop foreign investment opportunities to increase and enhance the profitability of Brazil's oil industry and Petrobras, as the country's state-controlled oil company.

In January 2003, Foster was appointed to serve as the Secretary of Oil, Natural Gas, and Renewable Fuels at the Brazilian Ministry of Mines and Energy. During this time, she also began serving as the President of Petrobras Química SA (Petroquisa), a role which accompanied her appointment as the Director of Investor Relations. She simultaneously served as the Executive Manager of Petrochemicals and Fertilizers, which was affiliated with the Downstream Management of Petrobras. In May 2006, Foster began serving as the President of Petrobras Distribuidora SA, with responsibilities as the Financial Director of the company. In September 2007, she was named as a member and officer of the Executive Board and Gas and Energy. In 2010, she became the first woman to serve in a management role in the company, when she was elected to the executive board of gas and energy.

On 9 February 2012, Foster was elected to serve as a member of the Petrobras Board of Directors and after a nomination by Brazilian President Dilma Rousseff, she was chosen to take over the helm of the company as the Chief Executive Officer, replacing José Sérgio Gabrielli, who had served as the head of the company for seven years. She was also named a Member of the Executive Board and Member of the Board of Directors of Petroleo Brasileiro SA Petrobras.

== Challenges ==
On the day that Foster was named as the new head of Petrobras in January 2012, stockholder shares in the company spiked, gaining nearly four percent. By April 2012, Foster's personal and professional integrity came under fire, when the Brazilian press began aggressively questioning business transactions that had taken place between Foster's husband and Petrobras. In 2010, the newspaper, Folha de S.Paulo, reported that a company controlled by Foster's husband, over a time span of three years, successfully negotiated business contracts to supply Petrobras with electronic equipment, resulting in financial gains in excess of hundreds of thousands of dollars.

In response to the scrutiny, Petrobras representatives denied any wrongdoing. None of the transactions involving Foster's husband took place before she had been appointed as CEO of the company. Additionally, none of the contracts involved the oversight of Foster in her leadership capacity with the company, previous to replacing José Sérgio Gabrielli as CEO. Petrobras also denied the claims that the company led by Foster's husband entered into transactions worth several hundred thousand dollars, but stated that only small purchases were made, worth considerably less.

Despite the deflection and discrediting of scrutiny by the media, public confidence in the company have waned, resulting in a loss in shares of over 30 percent in 2012. Concerns with the company's viability continue, focusing on a wide range of issues including delivery and procurement delays in offshore operations, maintaining profitability, while balancing costs with a low price point of domestic sales, and importing refined products from overseas. Additional concerns center around meeting demands, while not only meeting expectations, but increasing supply to an estimated 4.5 million barrels a day, from 2.3 million. Successfully meeting these goals require leadership to address any possible equipment bottlenecks, resulting in decreased cycle time and deliver. Challenges also include the development of new cutting-edge drilling technologies, while maintaining corporate environmental regulatory standards, which safeguard against spills at offshore fields.

In responding to public and shareholder concerns, Foster has acknowledged the challenges that accompany a female executive in a company with over 82,000 employees, in an industry dominated by men. As the first woman in the world to head a major oil-and-gas company, she doesn't shy away from a challenge, but even welcomes it to a certain degree. Speaking in an interview with the Brazilian financial newspaper, Valor Econômico, Foster said, "[Women] have to be prepared to go to work in these companies, [we] have to enter into the market. The market is ready ... for talent, competence and education."

== Board memberships ==
- BR Distribuidora – President of the Board of Directors
- IBP (Brazilian Oil, Natural Gas and Biofuels Institute) – President of the Board of Directors
- Petrobras Transporte SA (TRANSPETRO) – President of the Board of Directors
- Petrobras Gás SA (GASPETRO) – President of the Board of Directors
- Companhia Brasileira de Petroleo Ipiranga – Vice President of the Board of Directors
- Petrobras Biocombustível SA (PBIO) – Member of the Board of Directors
- Braskem SA – Former Board Member and Member of Compensation Committee

== Honors and awards ==
In April 2007, Foster was honored by the Order of Rio Branco with the merit rank of Commander, presented by the Ministry of Foreign Relations of Brazil. The following year, she was named Executive of the Year by the Institute of Brazilian Finance Executives. In 2009, she was the recipient of the Tiradentes Medal, presented by the Legislative Assembly of the State of Rio de Janeiro. In 2011, she was made a Knight Commander of the Admiralty Order of Merit, and in 2012, she received the Inconfidência Medal, the highest decoration conferred by the Government of the State of Minas Gerais, in recognition of her outstanding contributions to the social, cultural and economic development of Minas Gerais and Brazil.

Business positions
Preceded by Sérgio Gabrielli	President of Petrobras; 2012–2015	Succeeded by Aldemir Bendine
