= Jean Paul Prates =

Brazilian politician

CEO of Petrobras
- In office 26 January 2023 – 14 May 2024
- President: Luiz Inácio Lula da Silva
- Preceded by: Caio Paes de Andrade
- Succeeded by: Magda Chambriard

Senator for Rio Grande do Norte
- In office 1 January 2019 – 26 January 2023
- Preceded by: Fátima Bezerra
- Succeeded by: Theodorico Netto

Personal details
- Born: 19 June 1968 (age 58) Rio de Janeiro, Brazil
- Party: PT (2013–2025); PDT (2025–present)
- Education: Rio de Janeiro State University
- Profession: Lawyer and economist

Jean Paul Terra Prates (born 19 June 1968) is a Brazilian lawyer, economist, environmentalist, entrepreneur, union leader and politician from the Democratic Labour Party. He was Minority Leader of the Federal Senate from 4 February 2021 until 26 January 2023 when he resigned from the Senate to become CEO of Petrobras.

He remained in charge of the company until his dismissal on 14 May 2024. Prates attributed his ouster to "intriguing" within the government, after having clashed before with Mines and Energy minister Alexandre Silveira, with whom he disputed over the state oil company's policies, and reportedly having dissatisfied President Lula. He was succeeded by Magda Chambriard.

Business positions
Preceded by Caio Paes de Andrade	CEO of Petrobras; 2023–2024	Succeeded by Magda Chambriard
