= Pedro Parente =

Brazilian engineer, politician and administrator

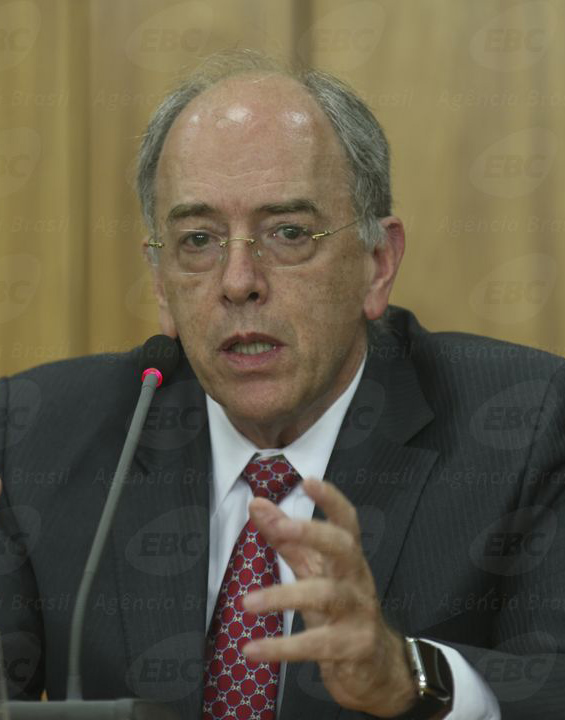

President of Petrobras
- In office 1 June 2016 – 1 June 2018
- Nominated by: Michel Temer
- Preceded by: Aldemir Bendine
- Succeeded by: Ivan Monteiro

Chair of Petrobras
- In office 25 March 2002 – 1 January 2003
- Nominated by: Fernando Henrique Cardoso
- Preceded by: José Jorge
- Succeeded by: Dilma Rousseff

Chief of Staff of the Presidency
- In office 1 January 1999 – 1 January 2003
- President: Fernando Henrique Cardoso
- Preceded by: Clóvis Carvalho
- Succeeded by: José Dirceu

Personal details
- Born: Pedro Pullen Parente; 21 February 1953 (age 73) Rio de Janeiro, RJ, Brazil
- Spouse: Joana Henning Generoso Parente
- Education: University of Brasília (UnB)
- Occupation: Engineer, administrator

Pedro Pullen Parente (born February 21, 1953, in Rio de Janeiro) is a Brazilian engineer, politician, administrator, and former president of the state oil company Petrobras.

== History ==
Born into a family with great political connections, Pedro Parente started his career in the public administration at 20 years old while studying to receive his bachelor's degree in electronic engineering. He was moved from the Bank of Brazil to the Ministry of Planning of Andrea Calabi, under request of his executive secretary João Sayad, to help create the Secretary of National Treasury. Years later, he worked in the governments of José Sarney and Fernando Collor de Mello until he played greater roles during the administration of Fernando Henrique Cardoso.

Under Cardoso's presidency, Parente was Chief of Staff from January 1, 1999, to January 1, 2003; Minister of Planning, Budget, and Management from May 6 to July 18, 1999; executive secretary of the Ministry of Finance; and also occupied the position of Minister of Mines and Energy in 2002. During that time he was known as "blackout minister", for being the coordinator of the crisis management team during the power outages that happened in that very year. He left the public administration for the private sector once Luiz Inácio Lula da Silva came to office and was appointed as vice-president of the Brazilian media conglomerate RBS group until 2010, when he accepted the position of CEO and president of Bunge Brazil, one of the largest trading companies in the world, which made its sugar and alcohol productions assets available for sale to concentrate on more profitable operations in grains, seeds oils and processed foods.

On May 19, 2016, Parente was appointed by then acting president Michel Temer to the office of president of Petrobras. His name was submitted and approved by the Administrative Council of the company, an essential requirement to take office. He was sworn in on June 1, 2017.

On June 1, 2018, after a week long trucker's strike against fuel prices, Parente resigned from the presidency of Petrobras.

Business positions
Preceded by Aldemir Bendine	President of Petrobras; 2016–2018	Succeeded by Ivan Monteiro
Political offices
Preceded by Clóvis Carvalho	Chief of Staff of the Presidency; 1999–2003	Succeeded by José Dirceu
Preceded by Paulo de Tarso	Minister of Planning, Budget and Management; Acting; 1999	Succeeded by Martus Tavares
Preceded by José Jorge	Minister of Mines and Energy; Acting; 2002	Succeeded by Francisco Gomide
