= Pixcodelics =

- Genre: Action; Sci fi
- Country of origin: Brazil
- Original language: Portuguese
- No. of episodes: 65

Production
- Running time: 5 minutes

Original release
- Network: Cartoon Network
- Release: August 13, 2005

Pixcodelics is a Brazilian animated television series transmitted on Brazilian television. Its creators are Marco Alemar and Caio Mário Paes de Andrade.

The series was first aired on August 13, 2005, and tells the story of 4 children called Pix, Nerd, Hack and Mary Chat, who have the power to save the Internet from the evil plans of Dr. Ping and his feline assistant Katslock. The series consists of 65 episodes lasting for 5 minutes each, with no continuity between the episodes - each has a story with beginning, middle and end. The animation is completely 3D. The characters are made entirely from letters, numbers and characters of computing, thus reminding ASCII art.

== Characters ==
- Pix: Pix is the leader of the Pixcodelics, and has a dog named Aurroba (a pun at "arroba", literally "@", and "au", the Portuguese equivalent to "woof").
- Hack: Hack is the strongest and the funniest of the team. He likes to joke with everything.
- Nerd: Nerd is the smartest of the team. The devices he invents always help his friends.
- Mary Chat: Mary is the only girl in the team. She is shown to be sweet and lovely.
