= Tangará, Santa Catarina =

Coordinates: 27°06′18″S 51°14′49″W

Tangará
- Municipality
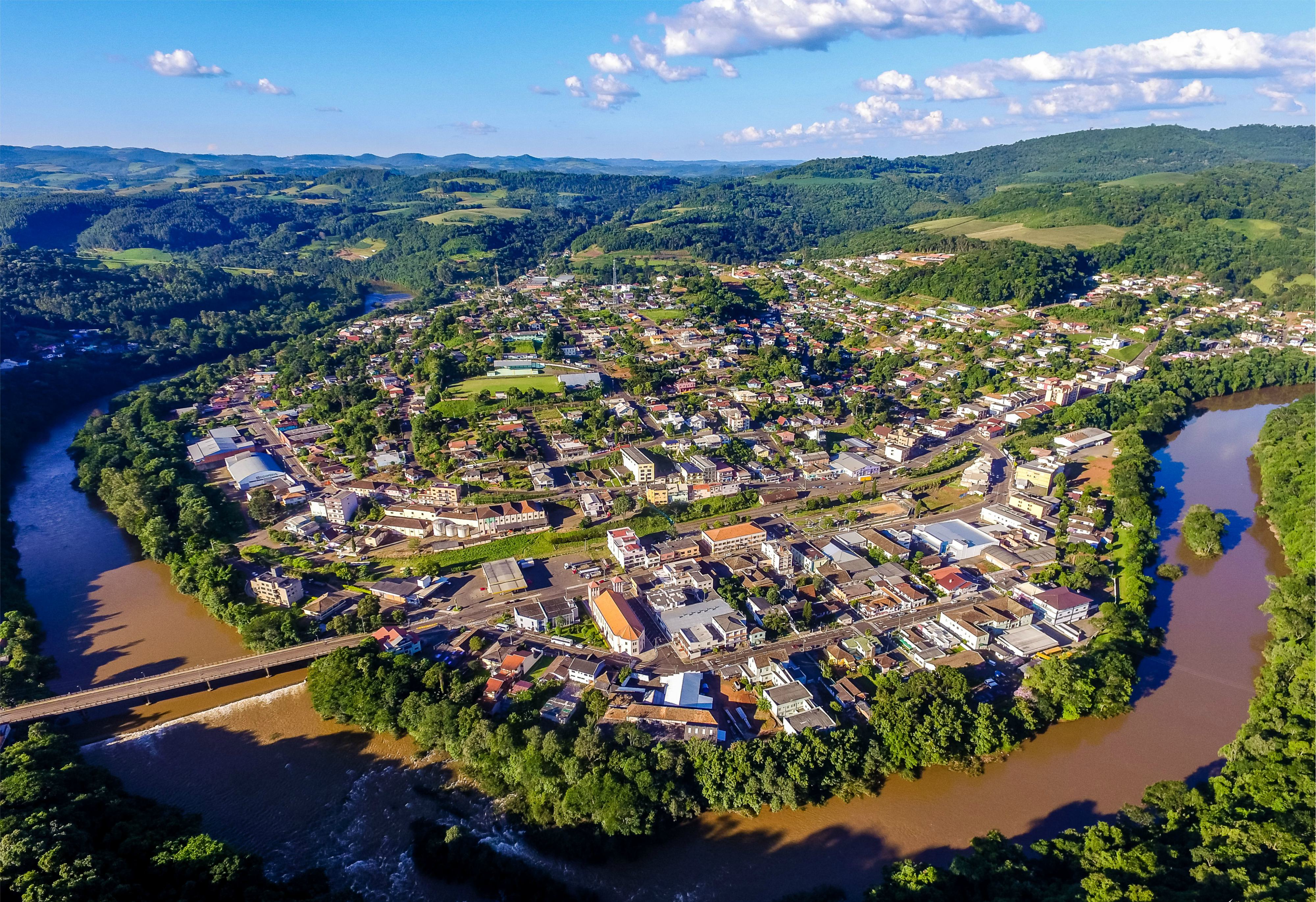

- Flag Coat of arms
- Interactive map of Tangará
- Country: Brazil
- Region: South
- State: Santa Catarina
- Mesoregion: Oeste Catarinense

Population (2020)
  - Total: 8,662
- Time zone: UTC -3

Tangará is a municipality in the state of Santa Catarina in the South region of Brazil.

== See also ==
- List of municipalities in Santa Catarina
- Tangara (disambiguation)
