= Tangara =

Tangara may refer to:

- Tangara (bird), a genus of birds
- Aerotec A-132 Tangará, a Brazilian military trainer aircraft
- Tangará da Serra, a town in Mato Grosso, Brazil
- Tangará, Rio Grande do Norte, a town in Rio Grande do Norte, Brazil
- Tangará, Santa Catarina, a town in Santa Catarina, Brazil
- Tangara train or Sydney Trains T set, a class of electric multiple unit trains in Sydney, Australia
- Tangara (novel), a 1960 children's novel by Australian author Nan Chauncy

== People with the surname ==
- Fousseiny Tangara (born 1978), Malian association football goalkeeper

== See also ==
- Tangra (disambiguation)
