= Sovereign Fund of Brazil =

State-owned investment fund

The Sovereign Fund of Brazil (in Portuguese Fundo Soberano do Brasil; FSB) was the sovereign wealth fund of Brazil, established on December 24, 2008 and dismantled on September 20, 2019.

The fund was a non-commodity institution which was required to support national companies in their export activities, and more broadly to act as a mechanism for anti-cyclical development, promoting investment in projects of strategic interest to Brazil abroad and internally. On the day of its establishment, the fund was endowed with R$14.243 billion.

Due to the national importance of the fund's activities, its advisory board was composed of the governmental ministers of planning and finance, as well as the president of the central bank. This board was responsible for approving the general guidelines and goals of the FSB's investments. The Brazilian National Treasury was responsible for operating the fund. The Fund stored most of its revenue frozen in national treasury bonds, thwarting the trend among the sovereign funds around the world of investing in private equities, foreign real estate and other countries public papers. Furthermore, a reckless and massive investment in Petrobras stocks to fuel the pre-salt exploration in the Atlantic caused a R$ 4.4 billion loss due to the 40% fall in the company's market value. After such fiasco, the Fund was finally shutdown in September 2019, amidst the government's effort to open the economy.
