= Associação Brasileira dos Caminhoneiros =

Associação Brasileira dos Caminhoneiros (ABCAM, Brazilian Association of Truck Drivers) is an association of freelance truck drivers in Brazil. It was founded by José da Fonseca Lopes in 1983. It represents around 500,000 independent truck drivers.

It played a lead role in organizing the 2018 Brazil truck drivers' strike, issuing an ultimatum in early May that led to nationwide disruptions on May 20.
