= Walter K. Link =

American oil geologist (1902–1982)

Walter K. Link (1902–1982) was an American oil geologist.

== Career ==
In 1926, Link went to work for the Standard Oil Company of New Jersey as a junior geologist mapping deposits in Venezuela, Colombia, and Ecuador. His work for Standard Oil then took him to Indonesia, Ada, Oklahoma, and the American Gulf Coast. From 1940–1945, Link was Standard Oil's Chief Geologist for much of Latin America, living in San José, Costa Rica and later Havana, Cuba. Commercial shipping across the Caribbean was hazardous during World War II, making sources of oil closer than Venezuela increasingly desirable.

In 1955 Link returned from semi-retirement when he accepted an invitation to become the leader of an exploration program for the new Brazilian petroleum monopoly, Petrobras. This led to the Link's memorandum summarizing the onshore petroleum potential of Brazil. Link recommended that Petrobras begin offshore exploration. The recommendation was unpopular with both Petrobras and the Brazilian press, but was borne out when after seven years the company took his advice.

== Personal life ==
Link was born in La Porte, Indiana, the ninth of 10 children. In 1924, he graduated from University of Wisconsin–Madison with a bachelor's degree in geology. In 1927, he married Miriam Wollaeger, a fellow graduate of the UW geology department. They divorced in Havana in 1945. They had three children. In 1953, Walter married Barbara King. Walter Link died in 1982.
