= Tangra =

Tangra may refer to:

- Tangra, the Bulgarian name of Tengri, the deity of Tengriism
- Tangra Mountains on Livingston Island, Antarctica, named after the deity
  - Tangra 2004/05, an expedition to Antarctica
- Tangra (band), a Bulgarian band from the 1970s and 1980s
- Tangra, Kolkata, a neighborhood in the city of Kolkata in West Bengal, India
- WASP-21, a star named Tangra after the deity

== See also ==
- Tangara (disambiguation)
- Tangra Blues, a 2021 Indian Bengali-language musical thriller film
- Tangra railway station, Punjab, India
- Tengra, a village in West Bengal, India
