= Link's memorandum =

Geology-related oil memorandum

Link's memorandum is a series of three letters written by the American oil geologist Walter K. Link after he accepted an invitation to establish an onshore exploration program in 1954, for Petrobras, the Brazilian petroleum monopoly. After he completed his six-year contract, his detailed evaluation recommended Petrobras to look offshore instead. The recommendation did not go well with either Petrobras, or the local press, in which he was "vilified mercilessly as the messenger with bad news."

After ignoring Link's advice for the following seven years, Petrobras finally accepted and acted upon his recommendation.
