= Cüneyt Aldemir =

Turkish dentist and politician

Cüneyt Aldemir MP

Member of the Grand National Assembly
- Incumbent
- Assumed office June 2, 2023
- Constituency: Tokat (2023)

Personal details
- Born: 1973 (age 51–52); Tokat, Turkey
- Political party: AK Party

Cüneyt Aldemir (born 1973) is a Turkish dentist and politician. He is the 28th term deputy of Tokat for the Justice and Development Party.

== Biography ==
Cüneyt Aldemir was born in Tokat in 1973. He graduated from Gazi University Faculty of Dentistry in 1995. After his graduation, he started practicing dentistry in Tokat.

In 1998, he took part in the Welfare Party Ankara Çankaya Youth Branch. In 1998, he served as a member of the Virtue Party Tokat Provincial Board of Directors. Between 2001 and 2007, he served as the Founding Provincial Chairman of the Justice and Development Party Central District.

Between 2009 and 2011, he served as AK Party Tokat Provincial Vice President. As a result of the 2014 Local Administrations election, he was elected as Tokat Provincial General Assembly Member.

In 2021, he was elected as the Provincial Chairman of AK Party Tokat. In 2023, he resigned from his position as Provincial Chairman to become a Tokat MP candidate.

In the 2023 Turkish general elections, he became the Justice and Development Party's 3rd place parliamentary candidate from Tokat. He was elected to the Grand National Assembly of Turkey as the 28th term Tokat deputy. He was elected to the Health, Family, Labor and Social Affairs Commission of the Grand National Assembly of Turkey.
