= Paul Feldman =

American businessman

Paul Feldman is the "Bagel Man" mentioned in Freakonomics by Levitt and Dubner, a man who started his own business selling bagels, instead of pursuing his old occupation as director of non-defense research at the Center for Naval Analyses. He would leave bagels next to a box with a slit in the top in an office building, leaving a sign asking whoever took a bagel to give money in return.

His bagel selling statistics about how often people stole bagels have been used to determine white collar crime.

Feldman has an undergraduate degree in agriculture and a master's degree in agricultural economics from Cornell University. He went on to the PhD program in economics at MIT but never finished his thesis, leaving in 1962 to work at the Center For Naval Analyses in Arlington, Virginia. In later jobs, he worked on the Program Evaluation Staff of the US Bureau of the Budget (now the Office of Management and Budget), at the Institute for Defense Analysis, as a consultant on a National Security Council study of the military draft, and as deputy executive director on the staff of The President's Commission on Federal Statistics. His last employment before starting his bagel business was as director of The Public Research Institute of the Center For Naval Analyses, from 1971 to 1985, which focused on economic studies of government non-defense policies.

== Publications ==
His publications include:

- "On The Optimal Use Of Airports In Washington, DC". Socio-Economic Planning Sciences. 1. 1967.
- "Why Regulation Doesn't Work". Review of Social Economy. XXIX (1). March 1971.
- "Efficiency, Distribution, and the Role of Government in a Market Economy". Journal of Political Economy. 79 (3). May–June 1971. doi:10.1086/259765.
- "Congressional Elections and Local Federal Spending". American Journal of Political Science. 28 (1). February 1984. doi:10.2307/2110791.
