= Magda Chambriard =

Brazilian business executive and civil engineer

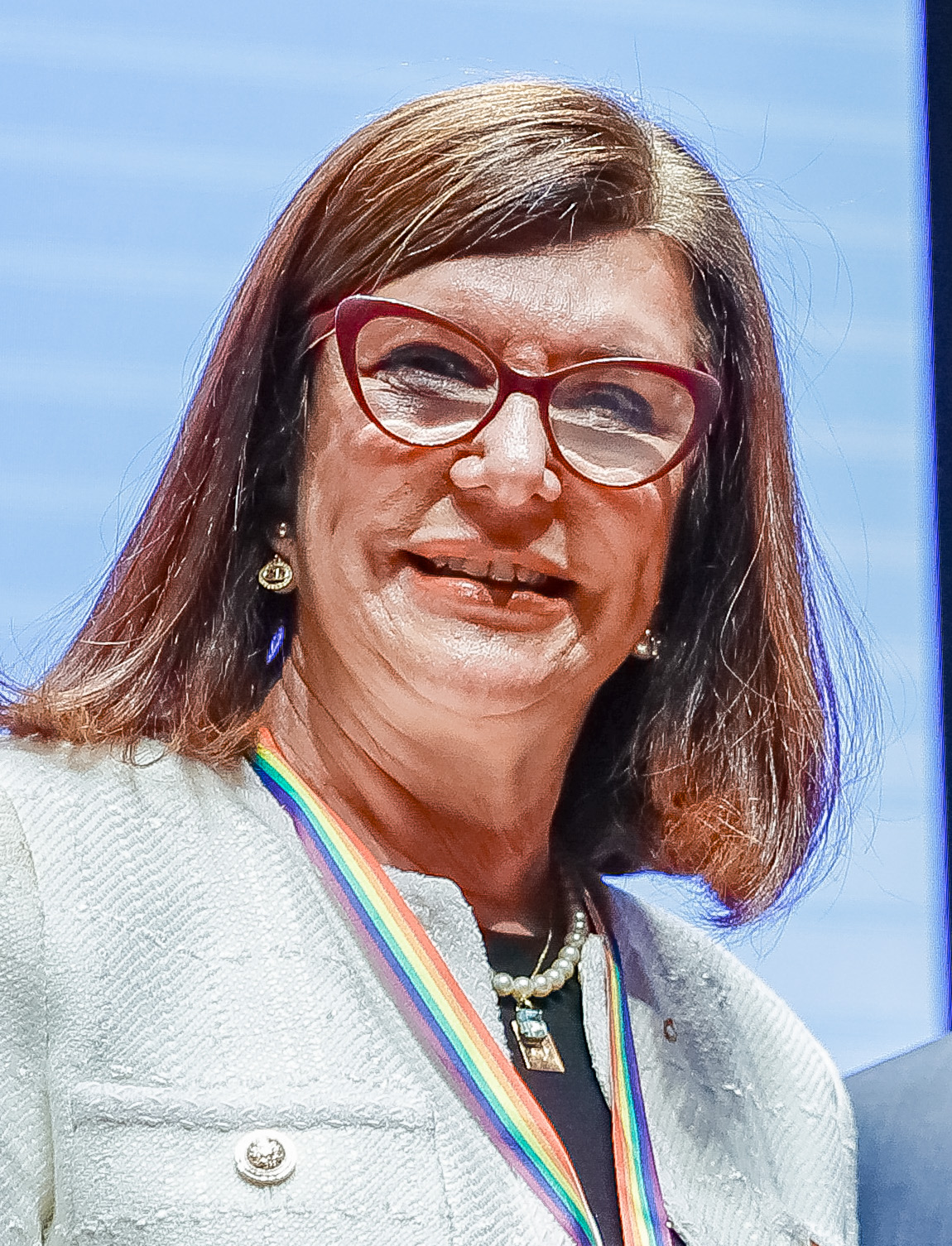

President of Petrobras
- Incumbent
- Assumed office 24 May 2024
- Appointed by: Luiz Inácio Lula da Silva
- Preceded by: Clarice Coppetti (interim)

Director-General National Agency of Petroleum, Natural Gas and Biofuels (ANP)
- In office March 2012 – December 2016
- Appointed by: Dilma Rousseff

Personal details
- Born: Magda Maria de Regina; 30 June 1957 (age 69) Rio de Janeiro, Brazil
- Spouse: Claude Jacques Chambriard (divorced)
- Education: Federal University of Rio de Janeiro (UFRJ)
- Known for: CEO of Petrobras S.A.

Magda Maria de Regina Chambriard (born 1957) is a Brazilian civil engineer. In June 2024 she became the president of Petrobras, the state-owned petroleum corporation that was ranked the 54th largest company in the world in 2024 by Forbes Global 2000. Between 2012 and 2016 she was the first female director-general of the National Agency of Petroleum, Natural Gas and Biofuels (ANP), the agency charged with regulating Brazil's oil industry.

== Early life and education ==
Chambriard was born on 30 June 1957 in Rio de Janeiro, to Sérgio Raul de Barros Regina and Cândida Alves de Barros Regina. Her father was a lawyer and Portuguese language teacher. She married a surgeon, Claude Jacques Chambriard. They later divorced but she kept his surname. In 1979, she graduated in civil engineering from the Federal University of Rio de Janeiro (UFRJ). She joined Petrobras in 1980. After studying at the Petrobras Corporate University on matters related to oil exploration and production, she completed a postgraduate degree in chemical engineering in 1989 from the Instituto Alberto Luiz Coimbra de Pós-Graduação e Pesquisa em Engenharia known by its acronym, COPPE, a branch of UFRJ.

== Career ==
Chambriard began her career at Petrobras in 1980, working in the oil production area, specialising in reservoir engineering. In 2002 she was assigned to the ANP as an advisor to the Exploration and Production Board. In 2005, she took over the Agency's Exploration Superintendence (SEP), being responsible for regulating and monitoring exploratory activities in the national territory. From 2008 she became one of four directors at ANP and in March 2012 was appointed director-general by the president Dilma Rousseff. She left the position in December 2016, after Michel Temer became president.

After leaving ANP she worked as an energy consultant to the Fundação Getulio Vargas and also established her own consulting firm. From April 2021 Chambriard served as director of the Fiscal Advisory Office of the Legislative Assembly of Rio de Janeiro. Following the election of Luiz Inácio Lula da Silva at the end of 2022 she became part of his transition team. She became president of Petrobras in June 2024 after being nominated by Lula.

== Criticisms and plaudits ==
During her term as director-general of ANP, she was criticized for allegedly receiving a salary from both Petrobras and ANP, and for taking on a position at a private company which could have led to a conflict of interests. Allegations were also made about her role in the bankruptcy of the oil company OGX, founded by former billionaire Eike Batista, which was alleged to have operated a "pump and dump" scheme to encourage people to buy worthless shares. Offsetting these criticisms, Chambriard was complimented for her handling of an oil spill in the Campos Basin as a result of well drilling by the Chevron Corporation in November 2011. This led to heavy fines for the company.
