= Caio Paes de Andrade =

Brazilian politician

Caio Mario Paes de Andrade
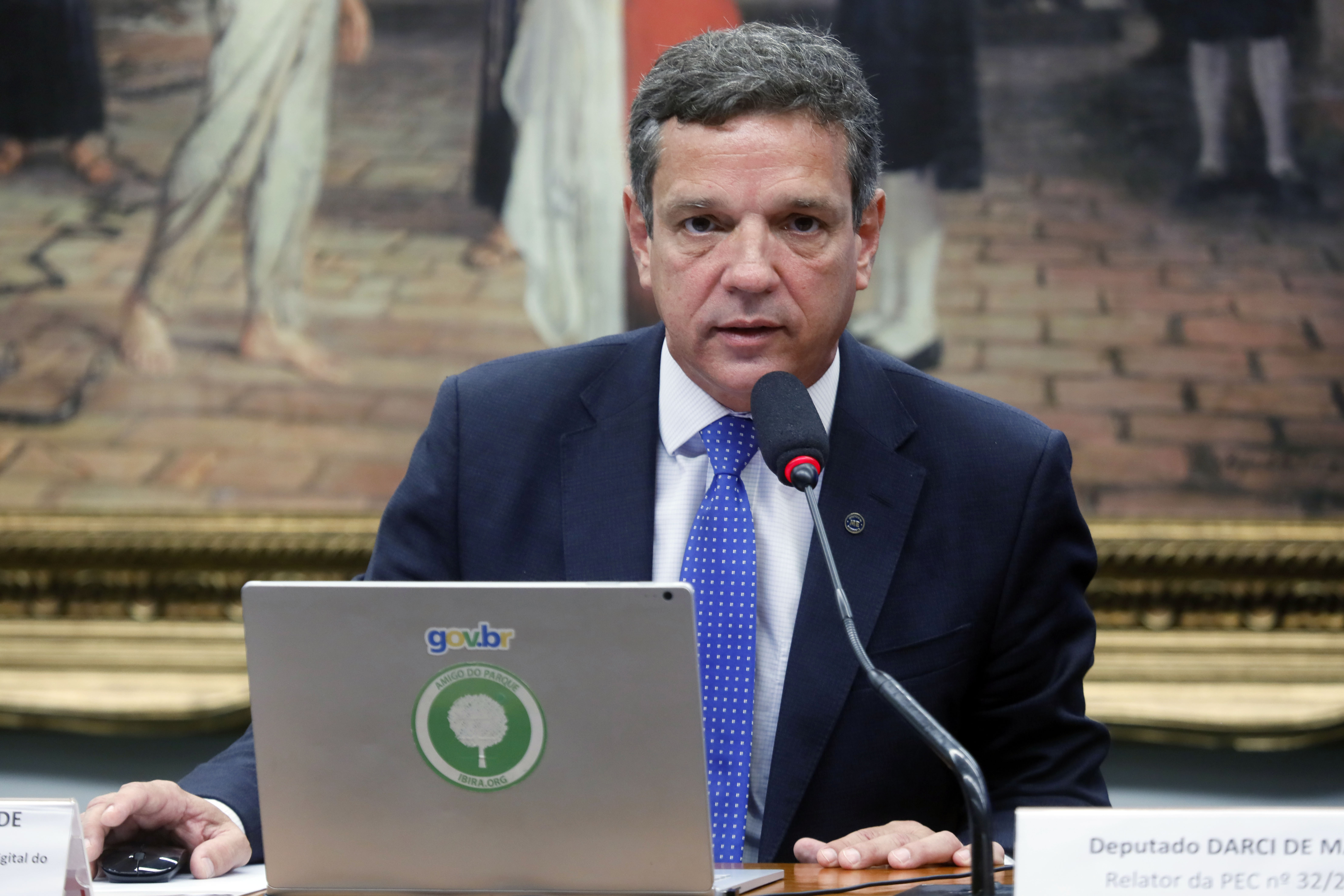

Department secretary of São Paulo
- Incumbent
- Assumed office January 2023

Personal details
- Born: 28 June 1974 (age 52) Rio de Janeiro, Brazil
- Education: Universidade Paulista; Harvard University; Duke University
- Profession: Entrepreneur and investor

Caio Mario Paes de Andrade (born 28 June 1974) is an entrepreneur, administrator, investor, and was a member of Minister Paulo Guedes' economic team. He served as the president of SERPRO, Special Secretary for Bureaucracy Reduction, Management, and Digital Government, responsible for the digital strategy and creation of the GOV.BR Platform, and also as the president of Petrobras from June 2022 to January 2023.

He attended the Military College of Salvador and holds a degree in Social Communication from UNIP, with a postgraduate degree in management from Harvard University and a Master's in Business Administration from Duke University.

== Career ==
Caio Paes de Andreade is a Brazilian entrepreneur with involvement in the creation of several internet-related companies in Brazil. Among them are one of the first internet service providers, STI, and the free website hosting service hpG. hpG was founded in the early 2000s and was sold to IG in 2002 in one of the largest transactions in the Brazilian internet market. He also founded Maber and 123i through the WebForce holding, which were sold to the real estate consultancy Lopes.

He is one of the creators of the Pixcodelics series, which resulted in the MMORPG Cosmopax.

In the social sector, in 2003, he participated in the foundation and promotion of the Fazer Acontecer institute, an OSCIP that promotes sports activities and citizenship education for teenagers residing in areas with low HDI in Bahia. Caio Mario acted as an entrepreneurship mentor at Endeavor Brasil Institute.

In 2019, he was invited by Minister Paulo Guedes to join the Bolsonaro government, assuming the presidency of SERPRO. In 2020, replacing Paulo Uebel, he was appointed Special Secretary for Bureaucracy Reduction, Management, and Digital Government, under the Ministry of Economy.

Leading the GOV.BR Platform, he strengthened the federal government's digital strategies by offering various new services to the population, reaching over 115 million registered users and elevating Brazil to the 7th position in digital government maturity by the World Bank, among 198 countries.

Caio was also a member of the Board of Directors of Embrapa and Pré-Sal Petróleo S.A (PPSA).

In 2022, he was considered to assume the presidency of Petrobras and officially nominated by the Bolsonaro government in an official note published by the Ministry of Mines and Energy in May 2022. His name underwent Integrity Background Check (IBC) and Capacitation and Management (ICG) assessments, being approved by 7 favorable votes and three against by the board of directors to assume the presidency of the state-owned company and by 8 votes to 2 to compose the same board.

Caio took office as the 41st President of Petrobras on June 28, 2022, remaining in office until January 4, 2023. Under his management, Petrobras recorded its highest net profit in history, earning R$188.3 billion Brazilian reais, distributing a total record amount of R$215.7 billion in dividends to its shareholders for the year 2022.

In 2023, he resigned from the position of President of Petrobras prematurely to assume the Secretariat of Management and Digital Government of Tarcísio de Freitas government in the state of São Paulo.

At the helm of the Secretariat of Management and Digital Government, Caio oversees the management of Detran - SP, the São Paulo State Data Processing Company, a technology company responsible for the Official Press and Poupatempo units, as well as the São Paulo Special Payments Institute (Ipesp), responsible for settling pension portfolios linked to the state of São Paulo.

== Awards and honors ==
- São Paulo Creation Club Yearbook Award 1991
- Best Internet Service Provider (i-Best 1999)
- Best Internet Service (i-Best 2000)
- Best Internet Service (i-Best 2001)
- Best Hosting Service - hpG (Info Award 2000 and 2001)
- Entrepreneur of the Year (i-Best 2002)
- 100 Best Place to Work 2006 - Maber
- 100 Best Place to Work 2010 - Maber
- Dinheiro's Best 2019 (Serpro)
- Exame Magazine's Best and Largest 2019 (Serpro)
- Best in Brazil - Popular Jury - Government - E-gov (i-Best 2021)
- Member of the Order of Rio Branco, in the grade of Grand Officer
- AGU Merit Order - 2021
- Assis Brasil Merit Order - TSE - Commander Grade - 2022
- Best Digital Service in Brazilian State Governments - Poupatempo SP.GOV.BR (i-Best 2023)

Business positions
Preceded by José Mauro Ferreira Coelho	CEO of Petrobras; 2022–2023	Succeeded by Jean Paul Prates
