= Aldemir Bendine =

Brazilian manager

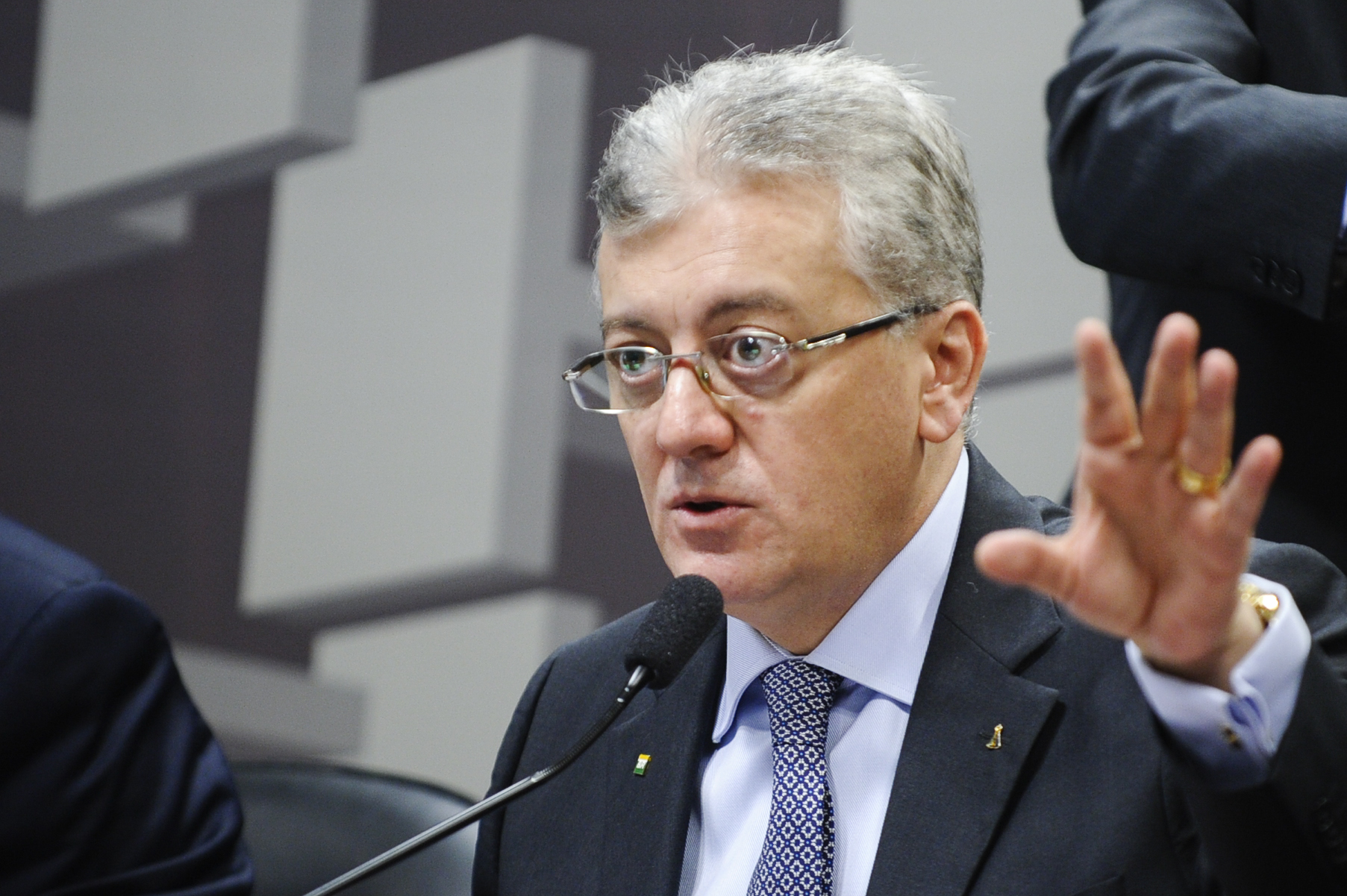
- Bendine in 2015.

President of Petrobras
- In office 6 February 2015 – 30 May 2016
- Appointed by: Dilma Rousseff
- Preceded by: Graça Foster
- Succeeded by: Pedro Parente

President of Banco do Brasil
- In office 17 April 2009 – 6 February 2015
- Preceded by: Antônio Francisco Lima Neto
- Succeeded by: Alexandre Abreu

Personal details
- Born: Aldemir Bendine; 10 December 1963 (age 62) Paraguaçu Paulista, SP, Brazil
- Spouse: Silvana Bendine
- Education: Pontifical Catholic University of Rio de Janeiro (PUC-Rio)
- Occupation: Company manager

Aldemir Bendine (Portuguese pronunciation: [aw.deˈmi(ʁ) bẽˈd͡ʒĩ.ni]; born 10 December 1963) is the former chief executive officer (CEO) of Petrobras.

== Biography ==
Aldemir Bendine worked for Banco do Brasil since the age of 15, rising to CEO. He was named CEO of Brazil's state-run oil company Petrobras, leaving his position as head of Brazil's state controlled commercial bank.

He was born in 1963, and has worked at the country's largest bank by assets, Banco do Brasil from the age of 15, eventually becoming its CEO. Bendine has been CEO of Petrobras from February 2015 to May 2016.

Aldemir Bendine has been a BRF board member since September 2015.

He was arrested in Operation Car Wash (Portuguese: Operação Lava Jato), a criminal investigation carried out by the Federal Police of Brazil on 27 July 2017.

He was charged by federal prosecutors with "passive corruption", money laundering, criminal organization, and obstruction of justice.

Business positions
Preceded by Graça Foster	President of Petrobras; 2015–16	Succeeded by Pedro Parente
Preceded by Antônio Francisco Lima Neto	President of Banco do Brasil; 2009–15	Succeeded by Alexandre Abreu
