= Petrobras =

Brazilian majority state-owned oil and gas corporation

Coordinates: 22.9094°S 43.1793°W

Petróleo Brasileiro S.A.

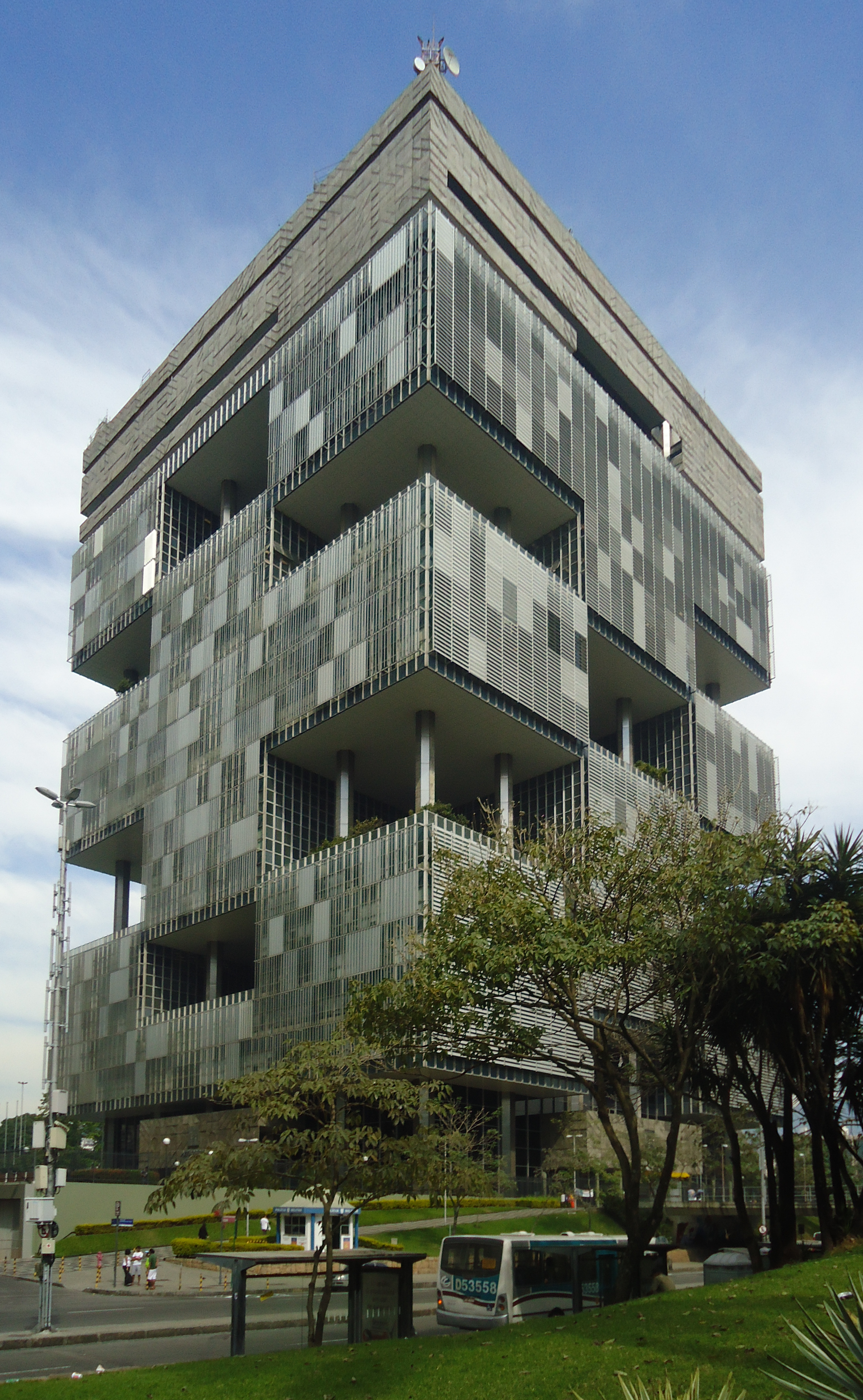
- Petrobras headquarters in downtown Rio de Janeiro, built by Odebrecht S.A.
- Trade name: Petrobras
- Type: Public S.A.
- Traded as: B3: PETR3, PETR4; NYSE: PBR, PBR.A; BMAD: XPBR; Ibovespa component; S&P Latin America 40 component; S&P Global 1200 component
- ISIN: BRPETRACNOR9; BRPETRACNPR6
- Industry: Energy (oil and gas)
- Founded: 3 October 1953; 73 years ago
- Founder: Government of Brazil
- Headquarters: Rio de Janeiro, Brazil
- Area served: Worldwide
- Key people: Magda Chambriard (CEO); Pietro Sampaio (Chairman); Giancarlo Moreira (Board Member)
- Products: Petroleum; Petroleum products Natural gas Lubricants; Petrochemicals; Fertilizers; Biofuels
- Production output: 2.99 million barrels of oil equivalent (18,300,000 GJ) per day (2025)
- Revenue: ▼US$ 89.2 billion (2025)
- Operating income: ▼US$ 42.5 billion (2025)
- Net income: ▲US$ 19.6 billion (2025)
- Total assets: ▲US$ 222.3 billion (2025)
- Total equity: ▲US$ 75.6 billion (2025)
- Owner: Government of Brazil (29.02%) (Note: A further 6.98% is owned by state-run bank BNDES, with its subsidiary BNDESPar owning another 1.05%.)
- Number of employees: 50,687
- Subsidiaries: Transpetro; Braskem; Petrobras Biocombustível
- Website: petrobras.com.br

Petróleo Brasileiro S.A., better known by and trading as the portmanteau Petrobras (Portuguese pronunciation: [ˌpɛtɾoˈbɾas, pet-]), is a Brazilian majority state-owned multinational corporation in the petroleum industry, which is headquartered in Rio de Janeiro. The company's name translates to Brazilian Petroleum Corporation.

The company was ranked #71 in the 2023 Fortune Global 500 list. In the 2023 Forbes Global 2000, Petrobras was ranked as the 58th-largest public company in the world.

Brazilian economist and diplomat Roberto Campos depicted it as a bureaucratic dinosaur and called it "Petrossauro" in the late 1990s, for its systematic inefficiency, sluggishness.

== History ==
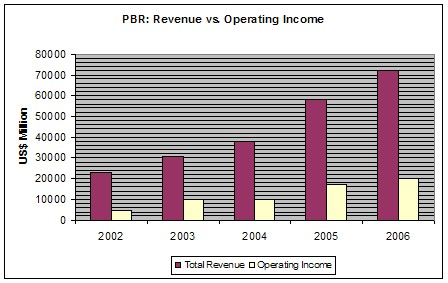
Petrobras' financial growth between 2002 and 2006

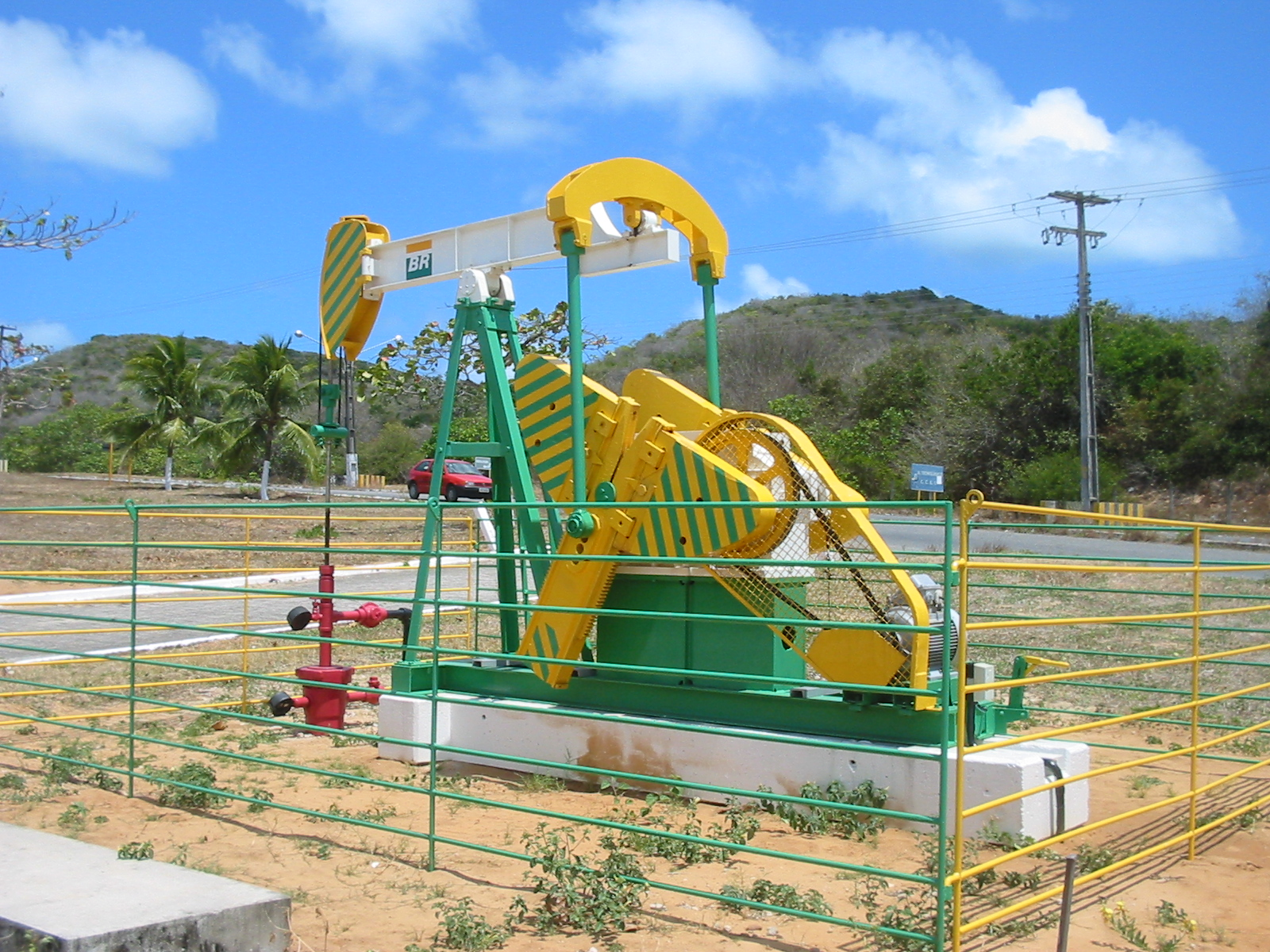
Petrobras standard model for its land oil pump, popularly known as Wooden Horse (Cavalo de Pau in Portuguese) in UFRN, Natal, Brazil.

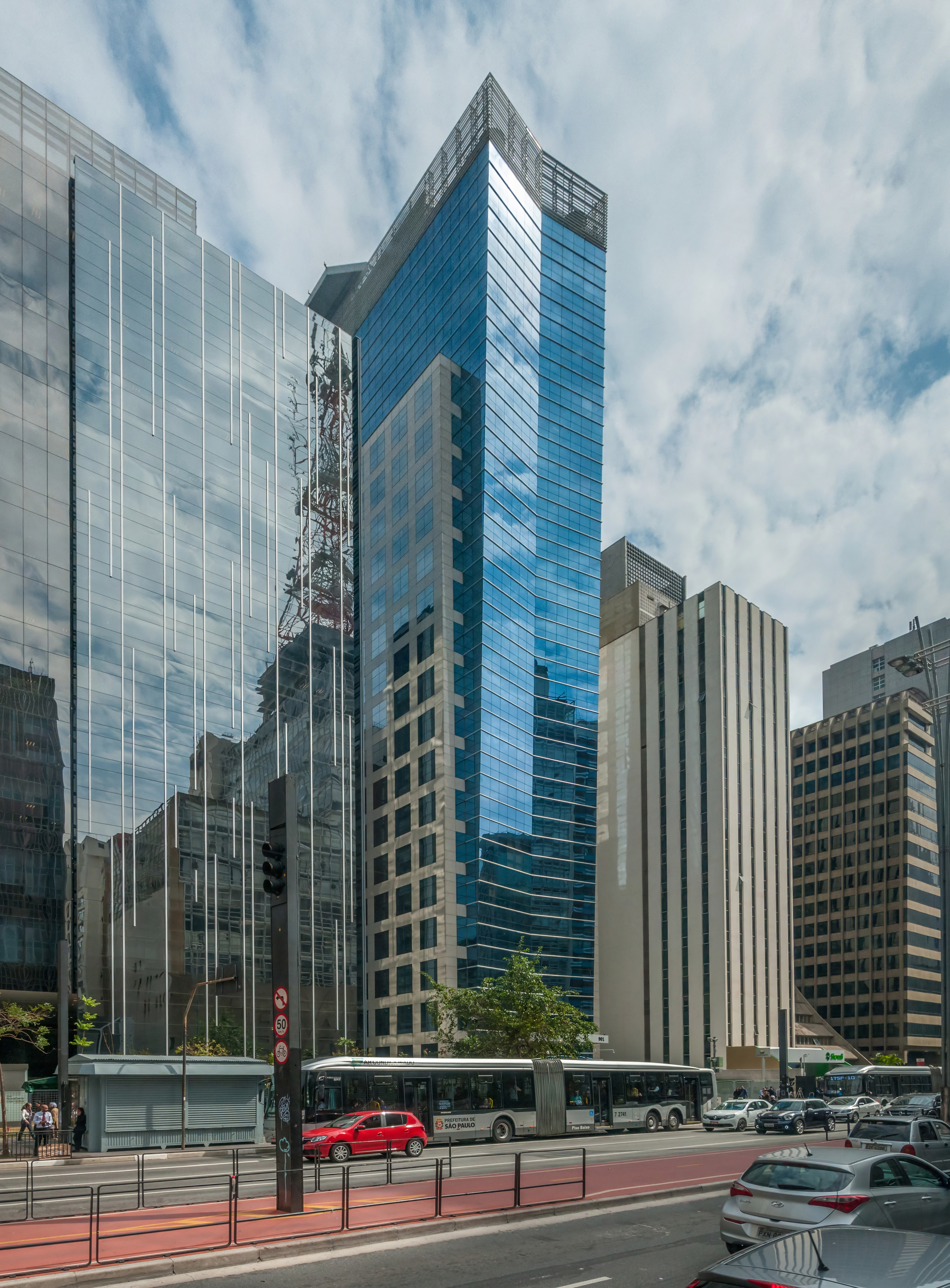
Skyscraper hosting Petrobras' offices in Paulista Avenue, São Paulo.

Petrobras was created in 1953 under the government of Brazilian president Getúlio Vargas with the slogan "The Oil is Ours" (Portuguese: "O petróleo é nosso"). It was given a legal monopoly in Brazil. In 1953, Brazil produced only 2,700 barrels of oil per day. In 1961, the company's REDUC refinery began operations near Rio de Janeiro, and in 1963, its Cenpes research center opened in Rio de Janeiro; it remains one of the world's largest centers dedicated to energy research. In 1968, the company established Petrobras Quimica S.A ("Petroquisa"), a subsidiary focused on petrochemicals and the conversion of naphtha into ethene.

Petrobras had begun processing oil shale in 1953, developing the Petrosix technology for extracting oil from oil shale. It began using an industrial-size retort to process shale in the 1990s. In 2006, Petrobras said that their industrial retort could process 260 tonnes/hour of oil shale.

In 1994, Petrobras put the Petrobras 36, the world's largest oil platform, into service. It sank after an explosion in 2001 and was a complete loss. In 1997, the government approved Law N.9.478, which broke Petrobras's monopoly and allowed competition in Brazil's oilfields, and also created the national petroleum agency, Agência Nacional do Petróleo (ANP), responsible for the regulation and supervision of the petroleum industry, and the National Council of Energy Policies, a public agency responsible for developing public energy policy. In 1999, the National Petroleum Agency signed agreements with other companies, ending the company's monopoly.

In 2000, Petrobras set a world record for oil exploration in deep waters, reaching a depth of 1,877 metres (6,158 ft) below sea level. In 2002, Petrobras acquired the Argentine company Perez Companc Energía (PECOM Energía S.A.) from the Perez Companc Family Group and its family foundation for $1.18 billion. This acquisition included assets in Argentina, Brazil, Venezuela, Bolivia, Peru, and Ecuador, 1.1 billion barrels of crude oil reserves, and production of 181 thousand barrels of oil equivalent (1,110,000 GJ) per day.

In 2005, Petrobras announced a joint venture with Nippon Alcohol Hanbai KK to sell Brazilian ethanol to Japan, called Brazil-Japan Ethanol. On 21 April 2006, the company started production on the P-50 oil platform in the Albacora-Leste oil field at Campos Basin, which made Brazil self-sufficient in oil production. In 2008 it discovered one of the world's largest oil reserves deep beneath the seabed and in 2010 the discovered another giant oil reserve. During the administration of the Workers' Party in the 2010s, Petrobras spent an estimated $40 billion subsidizing motor fuels, causing it to become the world's most indebted oil company. By November 2015, the company had accumulated $128 billion in debt, 84% of it denominated in foreign currencies.

In 2022, under the administration of Caio Paes de Andrade, Petrobras achieved its highest net profit in history, totaling R$188.3 billion, distributing R$215.7 billion in dividends, making it the second largest dividend payer in the world.

In summer 2023, Petrobras entered into a 5-year agreement with Weatherford International for providing offshore intervention services. As part of the cooperation, Weatherwood would also provide digitalization of production using the Centro well construction optimization platform.

Also in 2023, Petrobras announced the resumption of construction of a new production line at the Abreu e Lima refinery in Ipojuca, Pernambuco. The initial investment in the refinery is estimated at $18.5 billion, and the refinery will refine heavy crude oil from the Pre-Salt region.

== Operations ==
=== Business areas ===
The company operates in six business areas, listed in order of revenue:

- Refining, transportation and marketing – refining, logistics, transportation, trading operations, oil products and crude oil exports and imports and petrochemical investments in Brazil
- Exploration and production – crude oil, natural gas liquids (NGL) and natural gas exploration, development and production in Brazil
- Distribution – distribution of oil products, ethanol, biodiesel and natural gas to wholesalers and through the Petrobras Distribuidora S.A. retail network in Brazil
- Gas and power – transportation and trading of natural gas and LNG, and generation and trading of electric power, and the fertilizer business
- International – exploration and production of oil and gas, refining, transportation and marketing, distribution and gas and power operations outside of Brazil
- Biofuels – production of biodiesel and its co-products and ethanol-related activities such as equity investments, production and trading of ethanol, sugar and the excess electricity generated from sugarcane bagasse

=== Production and reserves ===
Petrobras controls significant oil and energy assets in 16 countries in Africa, North America, South America, Europe, and Asia.

However, Brazil represented 92% of Petrobras' worldwide production in 2014 and accounted for 97% of Petrobras' worldwide reserves on 31 December 2014, when the company had 8,112.8 million barrels of oil equivalent (4.9633×10^{10} GJ) of proved developed reserves and 4,599.7 million barrels of oil equivalent (2.8140×10^{10} GJ) of proved undeveloped reserves in Brazil. Of these, 62.7% were located in the offshore Campos Basin. The largest growth prospect for the company is the Tupi oil field in the Santos Basin.

In 2015, the company produced 2.284 million barrels of oil equivalent (13,970,000 GJ) per day, of which 89% was petroleum and 11% was natural gas.

=== International investments ===
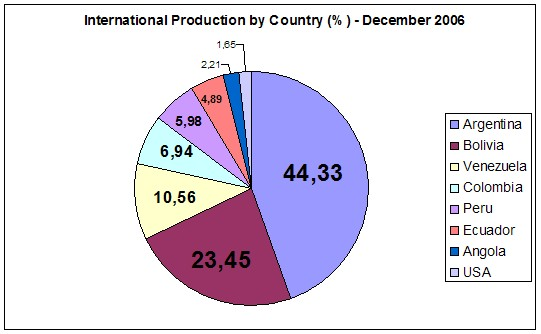
Petrobras' global oil exploration, as shown in December 2006 with a total of 243,292 BOED

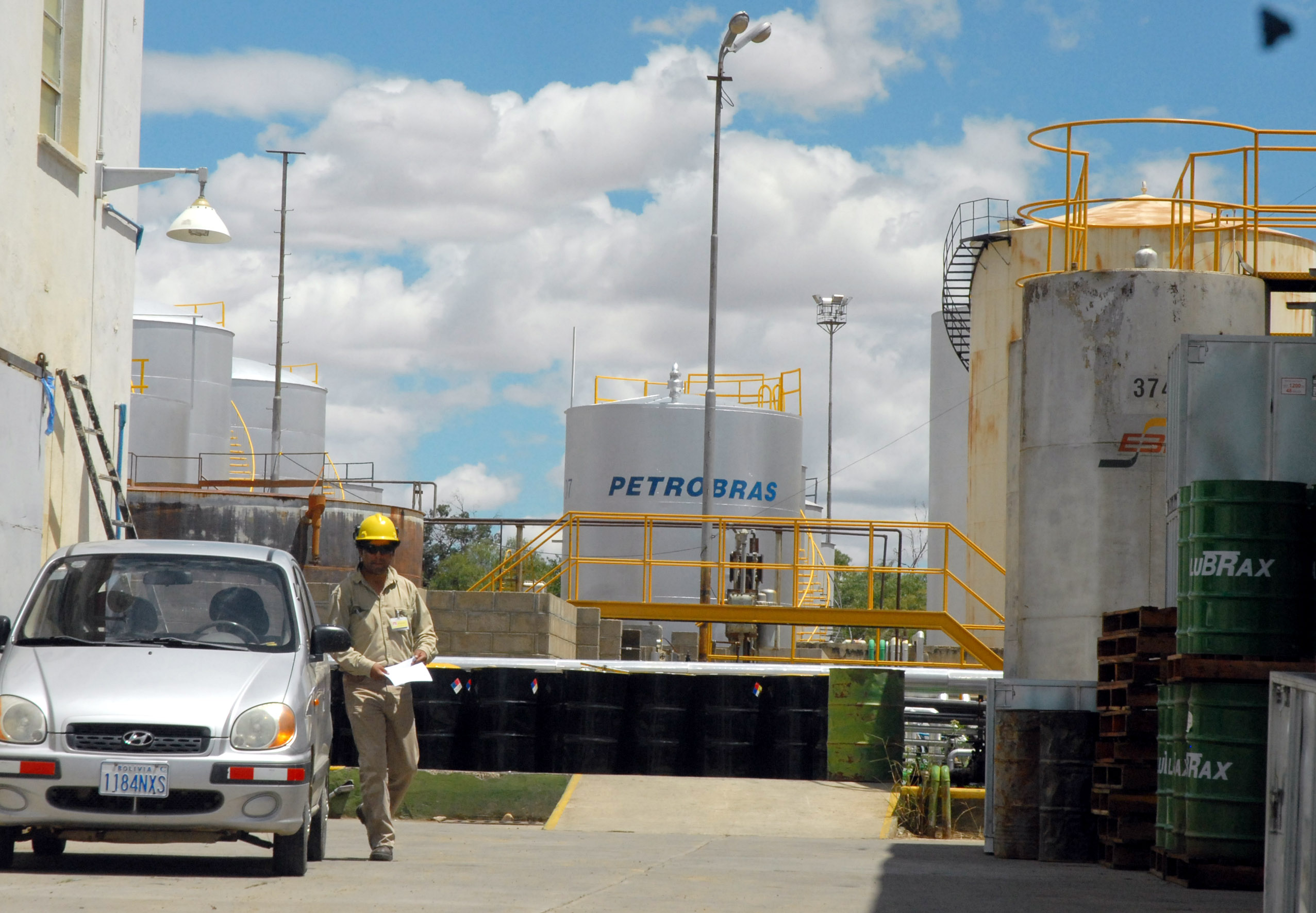
Refinery in Cochabamba, Bolivia, which was nationalized by the Bolivian government in 2007

Reserves held outside of Brazil accounted for 8.4% of production in 2014. The majority of these reserves are in South America; the company has assets in Bolivia and Colombia.

The company also owns exploration blocks in the Gulf of Mexico, in a joint-venture with Murphy Oil.

=== Refineries ===
Northeast Region

- RNEST – Abreu e Lima Refinery – Suape (Pernambuco) – 230,000 bpd
- LUBNOR – Lubrificantes e Derivados de Petróleo do Nordeste – Fortaleza (Ceará) – 8,000 bpd

Southeast Region

- REGAP – Gabriel Passos Refinery – Betim (Minas Gerais) – 150,000 bpd
- REPLAN – Refinery of Paulínia – Paulínia (São Paulo) – 415,000 bpd
- REVAP – Henrique Lages Refinery – São José dos Campos (São Paulo) – 252,000 bpd
- RPBC – Presidente Bernardes Refinery - Cubatão (São Paulo) – 178,000 bpd
- RECAP – Refinery of Capuava – Mauá (São Paulo) – 53,000 bpd
- REDUC – Refinery of Duque de Caxias – Duque de Caxias (Rio de Janeiro) – 239,000 bpd
- COMPERJ (Renamed GASLUB) – Itaboraí (Rio de Janeiro) – UNDER CONSTRUCTION

South Region

- REPAR – Presidente Getúlio Vargas Refinery – Araucária (Paraná) – 207,563 bpd
- REFAP – Alberto Pasqualini Refinery – Canoas (Rio Grande do Sul) – 201,280 bpd

=== Production ===
In 1961, Petrobras geologist Walter K. Link published Link's memorandum, which implied that the company was better off exploring offshore instead of onshore. In 1963, Petrobras discovered the Recôncavo Baiano and Carmópolis oil fields.

The company's growth was halted by the 1973 oil crisis. The entire country was affected, and the "Brazilian miracle", a period when annual GDP growth exceeded 10%, ended. Petrobras nearly went bankrupt. In 1974, the company discovered an oil field in the Campos Basin. This discovery boosted its finances and helped it restructure nationwide. In 1975, the Brazilian Government temporarily allowed foreign operators into Brazil, and Petrobras signed exploration contracts with foreign companies for oilfields in Brazil.

The company was affected by the 1979 energy crisis, although not nearly as badly as in 1973.

In 1997, Petrobras reached the production milestone of 1 million barrels (160,000 m^{3}) per day. The company also executed agreements with other Latin American governments and began operations outside Brazil.

In 2003, on its 50th anniversary, Petrobras surpassed 2 million barrels of oil equivalent (12,000,000 GJ) of daily production. On 1 May 2006, after the Bolivian gas conflict, Bolivia's president Evo Morales announced the nationalization of all gas and oil fields in the country and ordered the occupation of all fields by the Bolivian Army. On 4 May 2006, Petrobras cancelled a major future investment plan in Bolivia as a result. The Bolivian government demanded an increase in royalty payments from foreign petroleum companies to 82%, but eventually settled for a 50% royalty interest.

In 2007, Petrobras inaugurated the Petrobras 52 Oil Platform. The 52 is the biggest Brazilian oil platform and the third-biggest in the world.

In 2007 and 2008, Petrobras made several major oil discoveries including the Tupi oil field (formerly known as the Lula oil field), the Jupiter field, and the Sugar Loaf field, all in the Santos Basin, 300 km off the coast of Rio de Janeiro. The oil fields were discovered by partnerships that include Petrobras, Royal Dutch Shell, and Galp Energia. However, estimates for the reserves of these new fields varied widely.

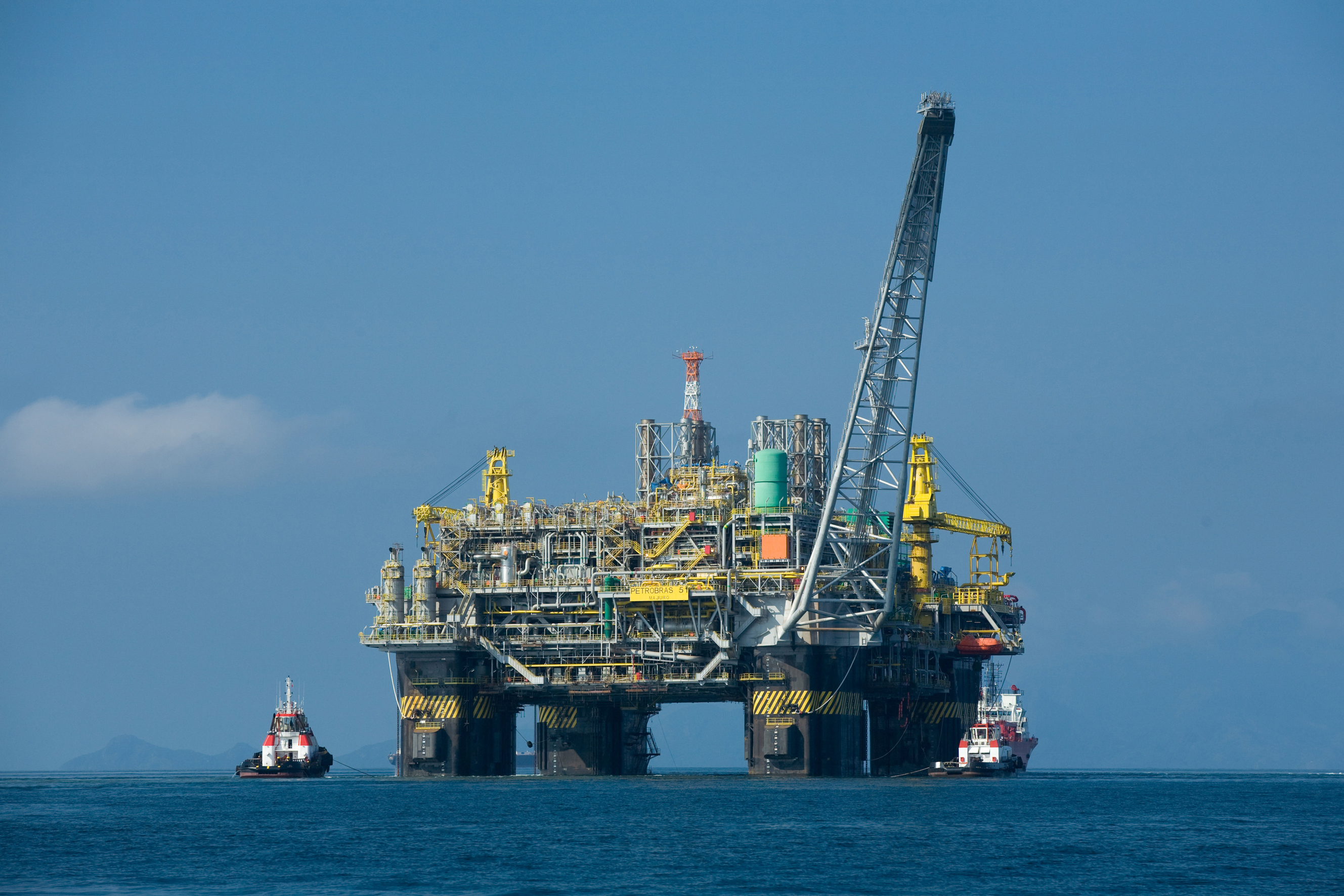
Oil platform P-51, the first 100% Brazilian oil platform

The P-51 Platform, the first semisubmersible platform built entirely in Brazil, capable of producing up to 180,000 barrels of oil per day, started production in the Campos Basin in January 2009, and in February 2009, China agreed to loan Petrobras US$10 billion in exchange for a supply of 60,000–100,000 barrels of oil per day to a subsidiary of Sinopec and 40,000-60,000 barrels of oil per day to PetroChina. In August 2009, Petrobras acquired ExxonMobil's Esso assets in Chile for US$400 million.

In September 2010, Petrobras completed a US$70 billion share offering, the largest share offering in history, to be used to develop newly discovered oil fields. Giovanni Biscardi and Machado Meyer represented Petrobras. Biscardi brought his Brazilian corporate practice to Greenberg Traurig in January 2020.

In 2012, Petrobras surrendered permits to explore offshore in New Zealand. Petrobras did not provide a reason but the New Zealand Prime Minister John Key said the decision was "not a reflection on the capacity to undertake deep-sea drilling or the prospect of activity of that area". He attributed the decision to a regrouping by the company after some setbacks.

In July 2013, a worker strike action shut down production at several of the company's oil platforms. In September 2013, Petrobras sold eleven onshore exploration and production blocks in Colombia to Perenco for US$380 million.

In September 2013 Organizações Globo reported on national television that the US National Security Agency (NSA) had been spying on Petrobras. The information was based on a top secret NSA file provided to The Guardian journalist Glenn Greenwald by Edward Snowden as part of the Global surveillance disclosures. The file showed that Petrobras was one of several targets for the NSA's Blackpearl program, which extricates data from private networks. Petrobras announced that it was investing R$21 billion over five years to improve its data security.

In 2014, the company sold its assets in Peru to PetroChina for US$2.6 billion. Also in 2014, Petrobras set a new company record for average daily production of 2.863 million barrels of oil equivalent (17,520,000 GJ).

In January 2017, the company concluded the sale of 100 percent of Petrobras Chile Distribuición Ltda (PCD) to the Southern Cross Group. The transaction included the licensing of the Petrobras and Lubrax brands for 8 years. To operate the assets acquired from Petrobras in Chile, Southern Cross created Esmax, a company that acts as a Petrobras licensee in the fuel and lubricant distribution segments. In March 2019, the company concluded the sale of 100 percent of Petrobras Paraguay Distribución Limited (PPDL UK), Petrobras Paraguay Operaciones y Logística SRL (PPOL) and Petrobras Paraguay Gas SRL (PPG) to the Grupo Copetrol, through its subsidiary Paraguay Energy. The agreement provides for the licensing for the exclusive use of the Petrobras brand by Nextar (the successor of Petrobras Paraguay Operaciones y Logística SRL) at that country's service stations, for the initial term of five years. In February 2021, the company concluded the sale of entire stake in Petrobras Uruguay Distribución S.A. (PUDSA), by indirect subsidiary (Petrobras Uruguay Sociedad Anónima de Inversión -PUSAI), in Uruguay, to Mauruguay S.A., an indirect wholly owned subsidiary of Disa Corporación Petrolífera S.A. (DISA).

In January 2020, Petroleo Brasileiro stated that it ended all of its business in Africa after completing the sale of a 50% stake in Petrobras Oil & Gas BV.

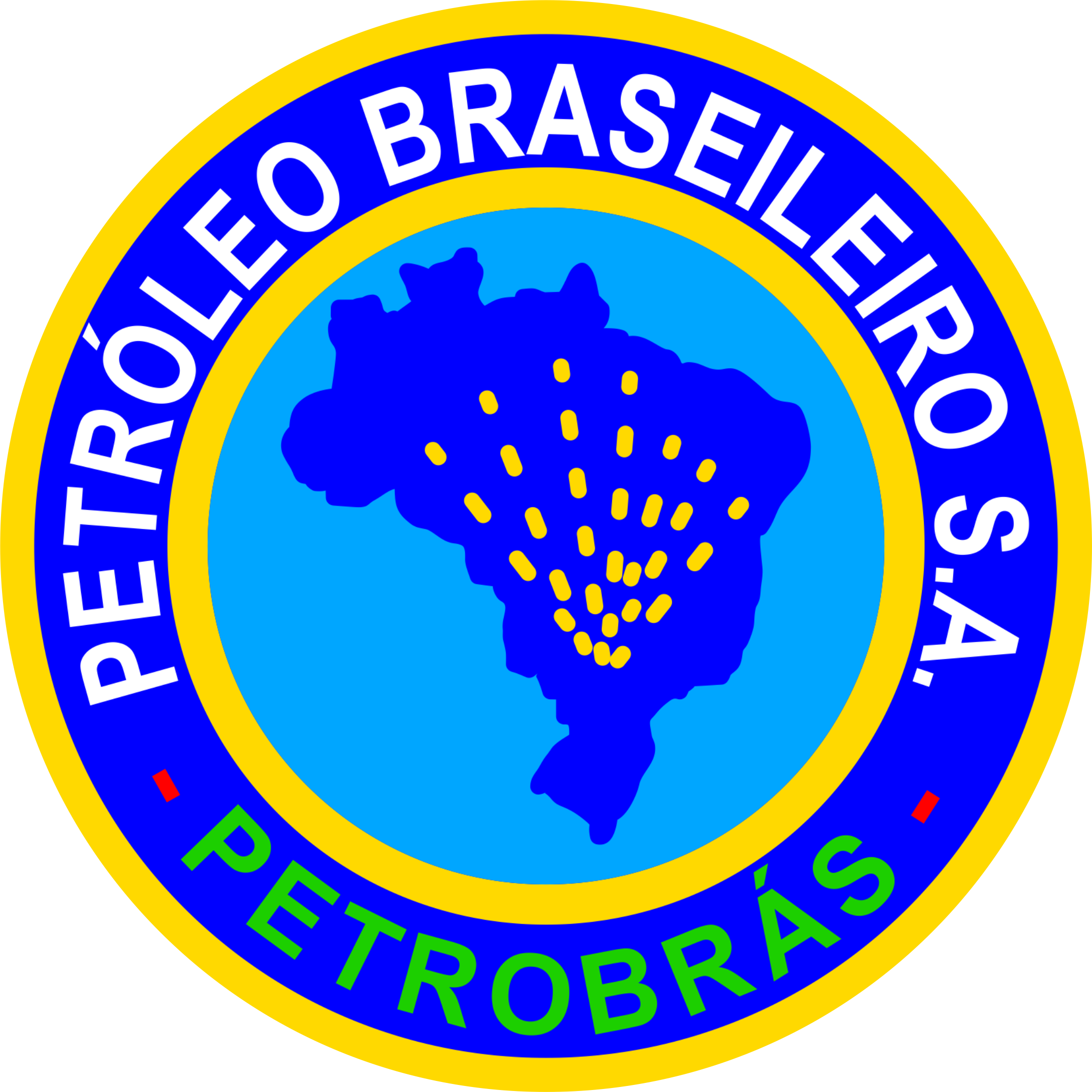
Classic emblem used in media during the company's early years.

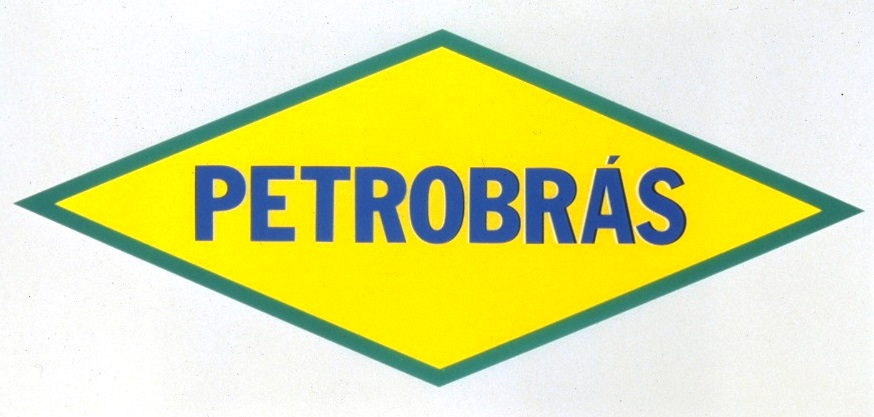
Logo used from 1958 to October 1972

Logo used during the 1980s.

Logo 1994-present.

== Corporate affairs ==
=== Ownership ===
The Brazilian government directly owns 54% of Petrobras' common shares with voting rights, while the Brazilian Development Bank and Brazil's Sovereign Wealth Fund (Fundo Soberano) each control 5%, bringing the State's direct and indirect ownership to 64%. The privately held shares are traded on B3, where they are part of the Ibovespa index. It is also listed in the New York Stock Exchange in the form of American depositary receipts and in the Madrid Stock Exchange.

=== Business trends ===
The key trends for Petrobras are (as of the financial year ending 31 December):

	Revenue (USD billion)	EBIT (USD billion)	Total Assets (USD billion)	Market cap (USD billion)
2000	26.95	9.16	63.08	13.71
2005	56.32	17.31	78.63	78.16
2006	72.34	20.03	98.68	112.95
2007	87.73	19.31	129.71	252.78
2008	118.25	28.19	125.69	107.43
2009	91.86	23.35	200.27	198.69
2010	120.05	27.47	310.19	224.83
2011	141.70	28.28	316.41	156.23
2012	149.83	16.77	327.39	124.16
2013	141.46	15.37	321.42	90.69
2014	143.65	-4.25	298.68	47.91
2015	97.31	-1.78	230.52	25.57
2016	81.40	7.90	246.98	64.31
2017	88.82	7.76	251.36	65.18
2018	90.60	14.79	222.06	81.56
2019	76.59	19.45	229.74	101.18
2020	53.68	5.54	174.34	71.83
2021	83.96	33.20	174.34	69.59
2022	124.47	56.81	187.19	69.46
2023	102.41	35.42	217.07	103.56
2024	91.41	14.98	181.64	77.50

=== Social responsibility ===
Petrobras is a major supporter of the arts in Brazil.

== Operation Car Wash and related protests in Brazil ==
Operation Car Wash (Portuguese: Operação Lava Jato) was a criminal investigation by the Federal Police of Brazil's Curitiba branch. Originally a money laundering investigation, it expanded to cover allegations of corruption at Petrobras, where executives allegedly accepted bribes in return for awarding contracts to construction firms at inflated prices. The aim of the investigation was to ascertain the extent of a money laundering scheme, estimated by the Regional Superintendent of the Federal Police of Paraná State in 2015 at R$6.4–42.8 billion (US$2–13 billion), largely through the embezzlement of Petrobras funds.

The authorities issued over a thousand warrants against business figures and politicians. It also led to a wave of arrests. Fernando Soares, also known as "Fernando Baiano," a businessman and lobbyist, was allegedly the connection between major Brazilian construction firms and the government formed by the Workers’ Party(PT) and Brazilian Democratic Movement (PMDB). Between 2014 and February 2016, the Federal Public Prosecutor's Office (Portuguese: Ministério Público da União) filed 37 criminal charges against 179 people, mostly politicians and businessmen. Former President Luiz Inácio Lula da Silva and then President Dilma Rousseff were also implicated.

On 8 March 2016, Marcelo Odebrecht, CEO of Odebrecht and grandson of the company's founder, was sentenced to 19 years in prison after being convicted of paying more than $30 million in bribes to Petrobras executives. Eduardo Cunha, president of the Chamber of Deputies from 2015 to 2016, was convicted of taking approximately $40 million in bribes and hiding funds in secret bank accounts and sentenced to 15 years in prison.

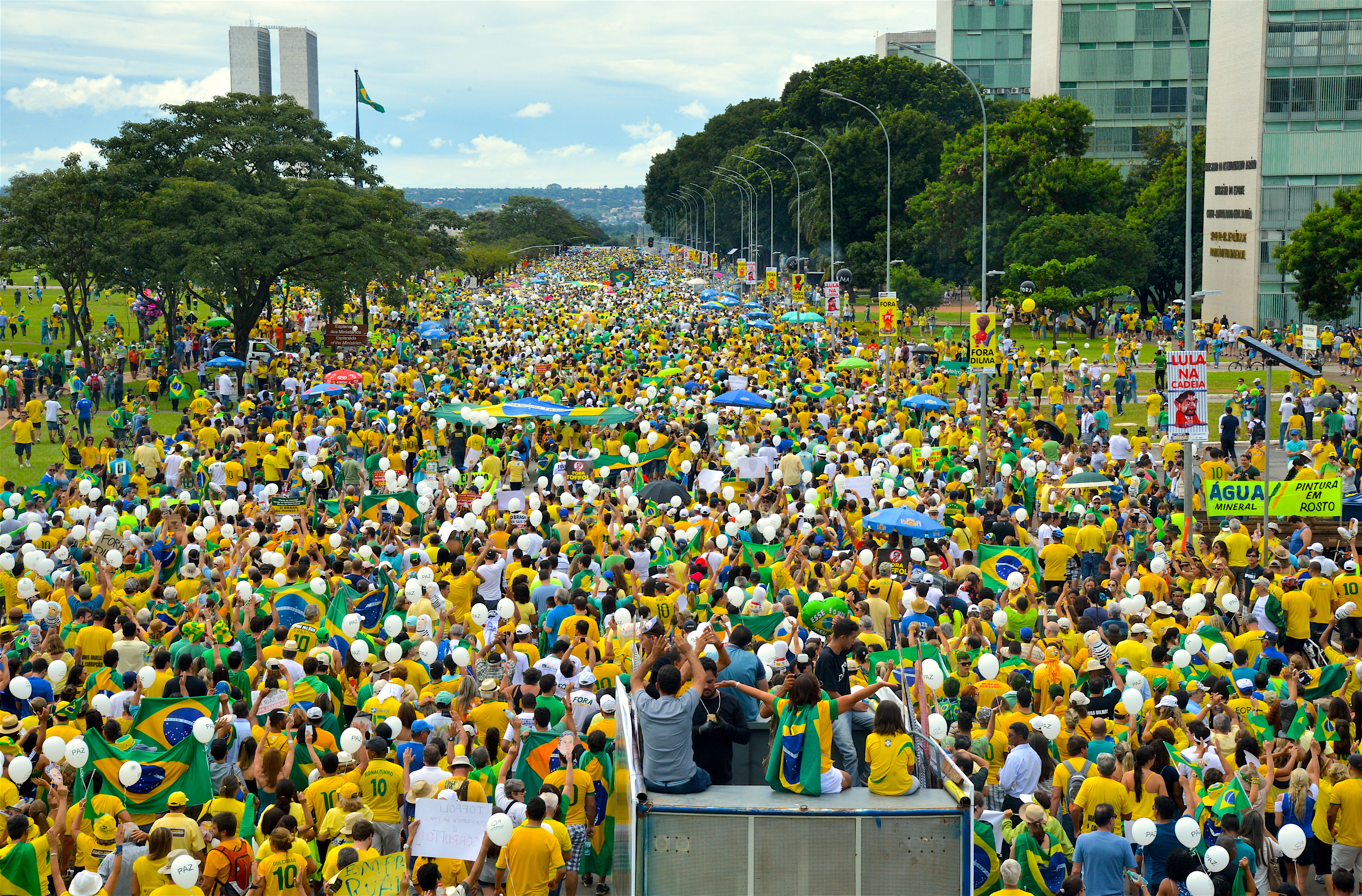
Protests in Brazil in 2015–2016 were sparked by revelations that a number of politicians had accepted bribes linked to contracts at Petrobras.

Protests broke out calling for the resignation or impeachment of President Dilma Rousseff. The most widespread of these occurred on 13 March 2016 in over 300 municipalities. Police estimates gave about 3.5 million protestors throughout the country. Some of the protests were in areas previously thought of as strongholds of the Workers Party, of which Rousseff was the leader.

The Bill and Melinda Gates Foundation sued Petrobras and its auditors, PriceWaterhouseCoopers as a result of the corruption scandal. In January 2018, Petrobras agreed to pay $2.95 billion to settle a U.S. class action corruption lawsuit. Later in September 2018, Petrobras agreed to pay $853.2 million to settle with Brazilian and U.S. authorities. Petrobras settled with shareholder Vanguard Group in June 2017.

On 1 February 2023 the company said it received R $132 million, as victim-beneficiary of the award-winning collaboration agreement signed between the Federal Prosecutor's Office and Rogério Santos de Araújo, before the Supreme Court.

== Environmental record ==
Petrobras's website notes several initiatives to preserve the environment. These include efforts to support both ocean and forest ecosystems. Most notably, Petrobras has sponsored population studies and conservation efforts for humpback whales in northeast Brazil. The company's efforts helped to rebuild Brazil's humpback whale populations from 2,000 in the mid-nineties to over 9,000 in 2008.

Petrobras subscribes to the United Nations Global Compact, a voluntary agreement regarding human rights, working conditions, corruption, and the environment.

In 2008, the Spanish consultancy firm Management and Excellence named Petrobras the world's most sustainable oil company.

=== Oil spills ===
Major oil spills – 1975 to 2001
Date	Volume (litres)	Location	State
March 1975	6 million	Guanabara Bay	Rio de Janeiro
October 1983	1.5–3 million	Bertioga	São Paulo
February 1984	700,000	Cubatão	São Paulo
August 1989	690,000	São Sebastião	São Paulo
January 1994	350,000–400,000	Campos Basin	Rio de Janeiro
May 1994	2.7–3.1 million	São Sebastião	São Paulo
March 1997	600,000 – 2.8 million	Guanabara Bay	Rio de Janeiro
October 1998	1–1.5 million	São José dos Campos	São Paulo
January 2000	1.3 million	Guanabara Bay	Rio de Janeiro
March 2000	18,000	Tramandaí	Rio Grande do Sul
March 2000	7,250	São Sebastião	São Paulo
July 2000	4 million	Barigui Iguaçu Rivers	Paraná
August 2000	1,800	Rio Grande de Norte	Rio Grande do Norte
August 2000	4,000	Angra dos Reis	Rio de Janeiro
November 2000	86,000	São Sebastião	São Paulo
March 2001	1.4 million	Campos Basin	Rio de Janeiro

== Sponsorships and namesakes ==
- In the Speed Racer live-action movie, one of the cars featured is the "Green Energy", a biodiesel-fueled racing car sponsored by Petrobras.
- Petrobras sponsored the Brazilian Série A from 2009 to 2012.
- Petrobras was a secondary sponsor for the AT&T Williams F1 Team from 1999 to 2008 (2000 to 2006 was as only fuel supplier due to Williams had a Castrol lubrication partnership and later increased role to lubricant supplier from 2007 to 2008) and signed again with Williams F1 from 2014 onwards. From 2018, Petrobras left Williams and sponsored McLaren, but cancelled their sponsorship at the end of 2019.
- Petrobras sponsored the Clube de Regatas do Flamengo in Brazil from 1984 to 2009, Racing Club de Avellaneda from 2002 to 2006, Club Atlético River Plate in Argentina from 2006 to 2012 and Universidad de Chile in Chile from 2019 to 2021.
- The sauropod dinosaur Petrobrasaurus is named after the company.
- Petrobras sponsored the game Copa Petrobras de Marcas, an unfinished version of Stock Car Extreme by Reiza Studios, the creators of the Automobilista series.

== See also ==
- History of Brazil (1945–1964)
- Eletrobras
- H-Bio
- Ethanol fuel in Brazil
- List of scandals in Brazil
- Petrobras 36 Oil Platform
- Petrosix
- Transpetro
- Tupi oil field
- Walter K. Link
- Brazil- China Relations
- Urucu Oil Province
- BR Mania
- Candeias Oil Well (C-1)
