= 1963 Brazilian constitutional referendum =

- 6 January 1963
- Do you approve the Additional Act that instituted the parliamentary system?
- Video of the Federal Senate of Brazil with campaign materials and a jingle by Elizeth Cardoso
- Outcome: Brazil rejects the parliamentary system.; The office of Prime Minister of Brazil is abolished.; President João Goulart becomes Head of State and Government.

Results
Choice	Votes	%
Yes	2,073,582	17.98%
No	9,457,448	82.02%
Valid votes	11,531,030	93.85%
Invalid or blank votes	755,145	6.15%
Total votes	12,286,175	100.00%
Registered voters/turnout	18,565,277	66.18%

A constitutional referendum was held in Brazil on 6 January 1963 to determine the country's form of government (parliamentarism or presidentialism). Voters were asked whether they approved of a constitutional amendment made in 1961 that transferred much of the president's power to the National Congress. The changes were rejected by the majority of voters, resulting in the choice of presidentialism, the end of the Parliamentary Republic established in 1961 and the restoration of the full powers of president João Goulart, also sworn in in 1961. The referendum's original date was April 1965, but it was brought forward.

Goulart's inauguration had been the target of an attempt at a military veto and it was only possible due to a political compromise that resulted in the adoption of parliamentarism to weaken his powers. However, as soon as he took power, he sought to bring forward the plebiscite provided for by law and restore presidentialism. A broad front wanted the end of the still little consolidated parliamentary experience, even without necessarily supporting the president. Thus, state governors, presidential candidates, trade unionists, the military and others defended the anti-parliamentary cause.

In 1962, political crises in July and September, both with general strikes and military pressure, allowed the president to obtain a favorable prime minister and intimidate Congress to bring forward the voting date. Goulart then received funding from businessmen for a strong election campaign, while the parliamentary cause had little support. The result at the polls was overwhelming in favor of presidentialism.

The anti-parliamentary effort was the priority of the Goulart government in its first year, being related to the short duration of parliamentary cabinets, the deepening of the national economic crisis, the strengthening of trade unionism (with the founding of the General Command of Workers) and the deterioration of relations with the United States.

== Terminology ==
In Brazilian terminology, a plebiscite is held before the legal or administrative act in question, while a referendum is held after it. Parliamentarism was instituted in 1961, with the act that instituted it providing for a "plebiscite" to be held on the matter, but the law that brought it forward called it a "referendum".

== Background ==
On 24 August 1961, then president Jânio Quadros resigned, seeking to trigger a succession crisis against the inauguration of his vice-president João Goulart, who was on a trip to China. Through the high military command, Quadros intended to receive extraordinary powers from Congress to govern; however, his resignation was accepted by Congress and he could not regain the presidency, but a crisis ensued: the military ministers did not accept the presidential line of succession and vetoed Goulart's inauguration, while Leonel Brizola, governor of Rio Grande do Sul, rejected the veto of the military ministers. The Brazilian Army was not united on the matter, as the 3rd Army (from the South) of general Machado Lopes joined the cause of Goulart's inauguration. The possibility of civil war arose, but "following an old national tradition" the solution was a compromise, preserving the president's mandate but weakening his powers through the adoption of parliamentarism.

Constitutional Amendment No. 4 to the 1946 Constitution, also called the "Additional Act", implemented parliamentarism as a form of government, later regulated by Complementary Law No. 1 of 17 July 1962. The legislation provided for pure parliamentarism, with a weak president elected by Congress and power concentrated in the Council of Ministers, whose president was equivalent to a prime minister. However, Goulart's term, still elected by popular suffrage in the previous system in 1960, would be a transitional period with a hybrid character. The law still gave political influence to the president, using ambiguous writing, and the hybridity manifested itself in the actual functioning of the system. Goulart still had prestige, the Legislature did not use its new prerogatives, and the system had little written institutionalization and no tradition. The relationship between the branches of government had little real change and the cabinets functioned as presidential ministries.

The new system had weaknesses from the start. It was discussed in a hurry and approved with a confusing text, removing powers from the president of the Republic in the full term of office. It was opposed by the political class from the beginning and had low popular acceptance. The measure had an ideological nature and irritated the left, for which it was a "white coup". Its permanence was not decided, since it was stated in the Additional Act:

Article 25: The law voted under the terms of Article 22 (Note: Article 22: "It will be possible to complement the organization of the parliamentary system of government now instituted, by means of laws voted, in both houses of the National Congress, by the absolute majority of its members".) may provide for the holding of a plebiscite to decide whether to maintain the parliamentary system or return to the presidential system, in which case the plebiscite consultation must be held nine months before the end of the current presidential term.

== Goulart's ambitions and implications ==
President Goulart (middle) and prime minister Tancredo Neves (right)

Goulart's term would end on 31 January 1966, so the plebiscite was scheduled for April 1965. Since taking office, Goulart articulated the reversion to presidentialism, and at the opening of the 1962 legislative works he explained his intention to regain his powers with an early plebiscite. The dispute for bringing the referendum forward, driven by trade unionism, military and political pressure, was then won in September by an anti-parliamentary coalition stronger than the parliamentary one — even Goulart's enemies wanted presidentialism. Opposing forces, such as military ministers and trade unions, participated in this broad front. The country went through two crises. The first, in July 1962, led to the inauguration of a prime minister subservient to the presidential agenda, and the second, in September, to the reschedule of the plebiscite.

In order restore presidentialism, Goulart needed to demonstrate fidelity to the legal order and enlist support to pressure Congress. Cabinet instability and inflation marked the beginning of his government. In his first year in power, he concentrated his forces on bringing forward the plebiscite, and thus had no interest in strengthening the parliamentary regime or in stabilizing the economy through an unpopular fiscal adjustment. There were difficulties in applying economic policy from the dismissal of Tancredo Neves, in June, to the reschedule vote in September; instability made any stabilization program unfeasible in mid-1962. Monetary and fiscal aggregates were out of control during this period, especially in the crises of July and September. Thus, Brazil was not in a position to satisfy the demands of the John F. Kennedy government in the United States, which was willing to negotiate financial assistance if the Brazilian government fought inflation and distanced itself from the left. In the 1962 congressional elections, the opposition received American funding.

The U.S. Embassy was concerned about the use of the radical left in the unions to support the early referendum. During this period, syndicalism strengthened its organization and even proved capable of acting against Goulart's wishes, although it did not have an "independent historical action". This strengthening later diminished the government's freedom to determine its economic policy, making it difficult to implement the Triennial Plan in 1962. At the same time, the president's political tactics strained his relationship with the business sector.

Some analysts attributed the success of the strikes to the protection provided by nationalist officers against state police repression. This support is confirmed by the sources in the case of general Osvino Ferreira Alves' 1st Army, but not in others, and yet the nationalist officers did not approve of the strikes. But for Goulart, military support was crucial and was achieved by placing nationalist officers in key commands as part of the nominations and promotions policy. At the very least, the neutrality of the Armed Forces was necessary so that popular pressure applied to Congress did not serve as a pretext for a coup d'état.

== Dispute to bring forward the plebiscite ==
=== Opinion of the political class ===
The National Democratic Union (UDN) and the Social Democratic Party (PSD) voted in favor of the parliamentary amendment, while the Brazilian Labor Party (PTB), Goulart's party, was against it. However, even in 1961 some members of the UDN and PSD were already conferring with the military for the return of presidentialism. For parliamentarians, there were reasons to oppose the consolidation of parliamentarism, as it would lead to the centralization of legislative activity in parties, to the detriment of individual parliamentarians, and the delegation of powers to the cabinet to the detriment of the parliament.

On the other hand, the PSD benefited from parliamentarism by being the largest party in Congress, and the UDN by weakening its enemy Goulart. For political scientist Argelina Figueiredo, UDN and PSD congressmen were mostly against parliamentarism, but a contrary argument is that, if this was the case, it would not have been necessary to apply so much pressure to bring forward the plebiscite. Goulart defeated offensives in Congress to consolidate parliamentarism, first in an attempt to pass a complementary law in September 1961, and then in administrative decrees that would strengthen the Council of Ministers.

The presidential candidates in the 1965 election, such as Juracy Magalhães (UDN), Juscelino Kubitschek (PSD) and Magalhães Pinto (UDN), wanted to get rid of parliamentarism as soon as possible. Leonel Brizola (PTB), possibly interested in running in 1965, wanted Goulart to use full presidential powers in favor of his base on the left. Magalhães was conservative, but he was part of the anti-parliamentary front on the left. Carlos Lacerda, from Magalhães party and also running for president, wanted to reverse parliamentary rule and is mentioned among its opponents, but he acted against the referendum.

In turn, state governors, among whom were Carlos Lacerda (from Guanabara) and Magalhães Pinto (from Minas Gerais), were unwilling to comply with Article 24 of the Additional Act, (Note: "The State Constitutions shall adapt to the parliamentary system of government, within the period established by law, which cannot be earlier than the end of the term of the current governors. The other federal, state and municipal terms are also respected until their end".) which provided for the extension of parliamentarism to the states of the federation. On 8 June, the governors met in Araxá, with the exception of Lacerda, and agreed to support the initiative to bring forward the plebiscite, on the initiative of Magalhães Pinto.

=== July strike and inauguration of Brochado da Rocha ===
The Tancredo Neves cabinet resigned in June 1962 in order to participate in the October congressional elections. This noncompliance was a presidential legal requirement and a proposed elimination was defeated in the Senate. Tancredo Neves was not dedicated to the preservation of parliamentarism, but his fall was the "beginning of the end" of the regime, as his cabinet, unlike the others that followed, was not formed with the commitment to bring forward the plebiscite and was not dependent on Goulart.

The president then maneuvered to discredit parliamentarism. On 27 June, he appointed San Tiago Dantas to succeed Tancredo; Dantas was known for the Independent Foreign Policy and was rejected by the right. After Dantas appointment was blocked by the UDN and PSD, Goulart appointed Auro de Moura Andrade, from the PSD's conservative wing, on the condition that he keep an undated resignation letter. Andrade was approved by Congress, but unionists called a general strike on 5 July to change the cabinet. On 4 July, the resignation letter was used to eliminate Andrade. With the impasse created by the nomination of Andrade and the attrition of two failed appointments, Congress accepted the nomination of Brochado da Rocha (PSD) on 10 July. Rocha was an inexpressive name, subordinate to the president and committed to presidentialism.

Pressure from the military apparatus, under the coordination of Amaury Kruel, was also used in the cabinet crisis. Between Andrade's resignation and Brochado's approval, Goulart, as commander of the Armed Forces, took the opportunity to nominate general Jair Dantas Ribeiro to command the 3rd Army; the 1st, 2nd and 3rd Armies came into readiness. Costa e Silva's 4th Army was not to be trusted. However, according to Olímpio Mourão Filho, out of the eight generals subordinated to Ribeiro, only one accepted the idea of a declaration in favor of Goulart. (Note: Mourão was ready, in reaction to an attitude of the government (he imagined that Congress could be closed), to activate his "Junction Plan", with an offensive of his 3rd Infantry Division against Porto Alegre. Mourão Filho 2011, pp. 157–159.) With support from the center and the left for a return to presidentialism, only that of the army was missing. In August, the three military ministers (army, navy and air force) declared their support for bringing forward the plebiscite.

The crisis left the country with 14 days without a cabinet, with negative political-administrative and economic impacts. In the union environment, the strike schedule was maintained even with the fall of Andrade and the attempt by Goulart and his allies to prevent the strike, thus demonstrating capacity to act against the will of the president. The strike had a national scale and was centered on a General Strike Command, which would give rise to the General Workers Command (CGT) in August. The CGT was the strongest organization of extralegal/"parallel" trade unionism and had its guidelines dominated by the Communist Party.

=== September strike and legislative activity ===
Goulart and his allies were waiting for the Superior Electoral Court to bring forward the plebiscite to 7 October, the day of the general elections. On 25 July the Court declared it had no jurisdiction to decide the date and pressure on Congress returned. The government wanted to delegate powers to the Council of Ministers to carry out the base reforms, and Brochado da Rocha threatened to resign if Congress did not vote on the plebiscite by 17 August. On that date, the period of "concentrated effort" in Congress ended and the parliamentarians would leave Brasília to conduct their electoral campaigns; if the cabinet fell, they would need to participate in the formation of a new one. An agreement was reached to avoid the resignation in exchange for another period of legislative "concentrated effort" from 10 to 15 September.

With the arrival of this period, the UDN and PSD managed to limit one of the advantages of the president — the absence of government during ministerial changes, which could lead to the postponement of the elections. On 12 September, the UDN and PSD approved the Capanema Law in the Chamber of Deputies, authorizing the president to appoint a provisional cabinet, and it was forwarded to the Senate. Meanwhile, on the 10th, the CGT made a series of demands: "to bring forward the plebiscite to 7 October, the delegation of powers to the Council of Ministers, the repeal of the National Security Law, a 100% increase in the minimum wage, the granting of the right to vote for illiterates and soldiers, the implementation of a "radical agrarian reform", the freezing of the prices of essential goods and the approval of the bill to regulate the right to strike". If they were not approved by the 15th, which was difficult or impossible, a general strike would break out.

=== Declaration of the 3rd Army ===
On 11 September, general Peri Constant Bevilacqua was appointed to the 2nd Army and reinforced the 1st and 3rd armies support for presidentialism. On 13 September, Jair Dantas Ribeiro declared himself incapable of maintaining order in the territory of the 3rd Army "if the people rise up" against Congress for not bringing forward the plebiscite. Minister of War Nélson de Melo disapproved of the attitude, but the 1st and 2nd armies supported the 3rd; only the 4th Army, now under the command of Castelo Branco, did not support it. The 1st and 3rd armies were the strongest commands. (Note: Villa 2014, "João-Bom-Senso": "the two largest armies in men and arms were fully communing with Jango's wishes".)

Along with the request for a state of emergency in 1963, this was one of the two moments in which Goulart "made use of strong pressure mechanisms, frightening everyone and giving rise to speculation about any unconstitutional plans he might have". The meaning of this action was, according to historian Carlos Fico, "to lead the National Congress to vote with the government, this way we could perhaps speak of undue pressure, but not coup d'état"; "it is true that Goulart played hard".

Although there was social unrest, "it remains unclear" whether Jair Dantas Ribeiro's attitude was justified. Historian Moniz Bandeira considered it reasonable, as Brizola also stated at the time. However, it was an exaggeration for the mayor of Porto Alegre, the president of the state Legislative Assembly and Jair's subordinates. Mourão was willing to act against his superior. Ernesto Geisel, commander of the 5th Military Region, contested his superior, declaring that in his territory "complete tranquility reigned". Testimonies in História Oral do Exército deny unrest in the 3rd Army area and emphasize that its commander's statement was a political maneuvering.

According to some sources, Goulart received proposals from the military for a coup. According to Hugo de Araújo Faria, from the Civilian Cabinet, Goulart told him that several military men offered to overthrow parliamentarism, but he refused. For Moniz Bandeira, general Amaury Kruel, head of the Military Cabinet, defended a coup d'état led by the president, and the commanders of the 1st, 2nd and 3rd armies wanted to intervene against parliamentarism. However, according to the testimony of San Tiago Dantas, Goulart would not accept an extralegal solution. Journalist Carlos Castelo Branco reported a conversation between Magalhães Pinto, mayor Ranieri Mazzilli and party leaders: according to Magalhães, Goulart would not stage a coup, but a military intervention against Congress was imminent, with or without the president's approval. General Mourão Filho believed that Kruel had planned to close Congress if the plebiscite was not brought forward.

=== Fall of Brochado da Rocha ===
On 13 September, the prime minister raised the "motion of confidence" before Congress regarding the delegation of more powers to the cabinet and the plebiscite. The "motion of confidence", typical of the parliamentary system, threatens resignation if a certain attitude is not taken. As there was no agreement, Brochado da Rocha resigned. Union and military pressure was already decisive, with threats of a general strike and disorder in southern Brazil, and now the fear of a left-wing cabinet, with general Osvino at the Ministry of War, weighed. With the mediation of senator Juscelino Kubitschek, the PSD-PTB alliance was reestablished and managed to bring forward the plebiscite. The general strike was launched in protest to the resignation of Brochado da Rocha, but it was weaker than in July.

According to Paulo Schilling, Brizola's adviser, the origin of the radicalizations (such as the declaration of the 3rd Army) was a conspiracy between Brizola, the CGT and officers like Jair Dantas Ribeiro. A series of radical laws would be presented to Congress by Brochado da Rocha, who would then resign. Under military and popular pressure, Congress would give its approval or be closed. As the prime minister resigned without presenting the ultimatum, the "progressive coup" plan failed.

== The law to bring forward the plebiscite ==
The law originally discussed in August was the amendment by deputy Oliveira Brito (PSD). It would hand over constituent powers to the Congress elected in October, potentially facilitating reforms (it would allow reform of the Constitution with a simple majority quorum), but would also strengthen the Legislature and allow Congress to significantly delay the plebiscite. Goulart did not want to waste even more time in office and prioritized bringing forward the plebiscite. The law is interpreted as an opportunity to carry out base reforms or a strengthening of parliamentarism that would leave the plebiscite in the background.

In the first call, already in September, the Oliveira Brito amendment, supported by the center and left parties, obtained a 140–62 vote, an insufficient majority to be approved. It was then negotiated that this amendment would be defeated on the first call in exchange for approval of the Capanema-Valadares amendment or Complementary Law No. 2. It was an addition by senator Benedito Valadares to the complementary law modifying the Additional Act; under the 1946 Constitution, what was needed to change the date would have been a constitutional amendment. The new text dealt only with the plebiscite, without controversial constituent powers. The Oliveira Brito amendment was defeated in the second call, and Complementary Law No. 2 was approved in the early morning of the 15th by the votes of the center and left.

Its article 2 read:

Constitutional Amendment No. 4 of 2 September 1961 will be submitted to a popular referendum on 6 January 1963.

The left wanted the date of 7 October, coinciding with elections for Congress and ten state governors, but this was resisted by conservative politicians who would be harmed by associating their candidacy with the unpopular "yes" option to parliamentarism. Even so, 6 January preceded the start of legislative work in 1963, as the president wanted.

The president's relations with Congress would be difficult in 1963. Congressmen accused the president of hypocrisy in his pursuit of reforms, as he discarded the Oliveira Brito amendment in favor of the Capanema-Valadares amendment.

The ballot would ask the voter: "Do you approve of the Additional Act that instituted parliamentarism?", with the options "Yes" and "No".

== Campaign ==
=== Positions ===
The focus shifted to the referendum after the October elections, and presidentialism had broad support, uniting interests that were difficult to conciliate. The controversy was not in the difference between the forms of government, but in the support or hostility to the figure of Goulart, to laborism, populism and the "Getulist legacy". The opposition linked the president to the communists, but the heterogeneous presidentialist coalition also had many anti-communist sectors that did not want to associate presidentialism with the left.

The presentation of the Triennial Plan, devised by economist Celso Furtado for the remaining years of Goulart's term, contributed to the campaign for a return to presidentialism. Leonel Brizola and Juscelino Kubitschek toured the country campaigning for the "No" vote to parliamentarism, and Magalhães Pinto organized a front of governors in support of presidentialism. Carlos Lacerda disagreed, as he did not accept collaborating with the president, and worked to demoralize the referendum.

PTB supported presidentialism, PSD was divided and the UDN had a parliamentary majority. The hopes of the UDN politicians were the thesis of the insufficiency of the plebiscite to revoke the Additional Act and the expectation of low turnout; the latter was defeated when the Electoral Justice determined that voting was mandatory. The Christian Democratic Party defended the "Yes" to parliamentarism, and the Brazilian Socialist Party the "No". The Liberator Party was based in Rio Grande do Sul and had a parliamentary tradition. Raul Pilla, one of its deputies, was the author of the parliamentary amendment of 1961. He recognized the defects of the system as implemented in 1961, but defended the blank vote or abstention, being a possible reason for the high rate of blank votes in Rio Grande do Sul (5.08%), the highest among states.

The trade union movement supported Goulart on the condition that he fulfill his promise in September, especially an increase in the minimum wage. Thus, with the delay in compliance, this support was at risk. Just a few days before the referendum, in 1963, the president raised the minimum wage by 75% (below the 100% required by the CGT), securing support. The Instituto de Pesquisas e Estudos Sociais preferred presidentialism, although it did not actively participate in the anti-parliamentary front; for the organization, interested in deposing Goulart, presidentialism allowed attributing the country's ills directly to him. The Episcopal Conference of Brazil recommended the participation of the electorate, in practice supporting the "No", but some conservative clerics disagreed. The press, although mostly opposed to Goulart, publicized the pro-presidential campaign and did not invest in the defense of parliamentarism.

The left in general defended presidentialism. However, the null vote was defended by Francisco Julião, representative of the Peasant Leagues, the Communist Party of Brazil (PCdoB, newly created and opposed to the PCB) and the Trotskyist Revolutionary Workers Party. Julião believed in parliamentarianism and criticized the position behind the government, but he was isolated and received much criticism for choosing an option similar to that of Carlos Lacerda.

=== Funding ===
The campaign for presidentialism was "long and costly, financed by bankers and contractors linked to the interests of the PSD-PTB party alliance". "The propaganda machine set up by those in favor of the return of presidentialism, the millions of cruzeiros — denounced by UDN parliamentarians — the posters, jingles, newspaper articles, appeals" worked. José Luiz de Magalhães Lins, nephew of the governor of Minas Gerais and president of the National Bank of Minas Gerais, coordinated the finances, hiring five advertising agencies. The chief of the Civilian Cabinet went to France to study the 1958 referendum. Propaganda for the "No" came to rely on the use of public machinery, such as Brazilian Air Force planes that transported agents of this campaign.

Propaganda for presidentialism blamed inflation and the social crisis on the parliamentary system, making it necessary to empower the president to act against extreme poverty, illiteracy, landlessness and political crises. It associated the victory of presidentialism with the implementation of basic reforms. At the behest of Darcy Ribeiro's Ministry of Education, the Instituto Superior de Estudos Brasileiros published the pamphlet "Why vote against parliamentarism in the plebiscite?", which was the object of criticism from the UDN and O Globo; Lacerda sought to confiscate it with his Department of Political and Social Order. In addition to this pamphlet, the Guanabara police raided print shops and offices and seized other campaign materials. Diário Carioca, supported by the Nationalist Parliamentary Front and the communists, denounced Lacerda's coup intentions. The 1st Army, Navy and Air Force prepared a military device to guarantee the holding of the referendum in Guanabara, but it was not necessary.

Parliamentarism supporters had their backers, but they were not as strong. Historiography usually accepts the position of Hermes Lima, the last prime minister, that there was no campaign for "Yes", and the most traditional parliamentarians (Raul Pilla and the Liberator Party) defended abstention, but there was a modest parliamentary campaign. One of the parliamentary acts was a talk given by Juarez Távora over the radio.

The Electoral Justice determined compulsory voting, defining the defense of abstention as an electoral crime and deadlines for advertising the referendum on radio and television, without allowing criticism of people and authorities.

== Results ==
Voter turnout was 66%, lower than the October 1962 elections (80%), with 82% of eligible voters against the 1961 constitutional amendment, but the large proportion (4–5:1) of "No" votes against the "Yes" ones gave it a number of voters (more than 9 million) greater than those of Jânio Quadros (5,636,623) and Goulart (4,547,010) in the 1960 presidential election. Constitutional Amendment No. 4 of 23 January revoked Constitutional Amendment No. 6 and restored the presidential system of the 1946 constitution.

Choice	Votes	%
For	2,073,582	17.98
Against	9,457,448	82.02
Total	11,531,030	100.00
Valid votes	11,531,030	93.85
Invalid votes	470,701	3.83
Blank votes	284,444	2.32
Total votes	12,286,175	100.00
Registered voters/turnout	18,565,277	66.18
Source: Nohlen 2005, p. 189

=== By state and territory ===
State or territory	For		Against		Valid votes
State or territory	Votes	%	Votes	%	Valid votes
Acre	2,008	17.47	9,488	82.53	11,496
Alagoas	7,875	7.80	93,145	92.20	101,020
Amazonas	11,695	19.16	49,358	80.84	61,053
Bahia	42,484	7.78	503,662	92.22	546,146
Brasília	3,298	7.05	43,465	92.95	46,763
Ceará	44,968	11.10	360,232	88.90	405,200
Espírito Santo	45,350	22.36	157,458	77.64	202,808
Goiás	27,483	10.89	224,939	89.11	252,422
Guanabara	227,077	22.82	768,143	77.18	995,200
Maranhão	12,356	4.92	238,594	95.08	250,950
Mato Grosso	10,455	8.01	120,122	91.99	130,577
Minas Gerais	348,227	23.30	1,146,452	76.70	1,494,679
Pará	22,351	14.82	128,500	85.18	150,851
Paraíba	19,432	9.81	178,630	90.19	198,062
Paraná	159,605	23.59	516,896	76.41	676,501
Pernambuco	33,977	8.14	383,547	91.86	417,524
Piauí	14,153	10.34	122,674	89.66	136,827
Rio de Janeiro	113,408	14.59	663,694	85.41	777,102
Rio Grande do Norte	13,454	6.96	179,941	93.04	193,395
Rio Grande do Sul	328,872	29.52	785,222	70.48	1,114,094
Santa Catarina	176,998	39.41	272,153	60.59	449,151
São Paulo	401,747	14.30	2,407,090	85.70	2,808,837
Sergipe	5,125	5.73	84,327	94.27	89,452
Territory of Amapá	634	6.74	8,777	93.26	9,411
Territory of Roraima	274	7.74	3,265	92.26	3,539
Territory of Rondônia	276	3.47	7,674	96.53	7,950
Total	2,073,582	17.98	9,457,448	82.02	11,531,030
Source: Tribunal Superior Eleitoral

== Aftermath ==
Goulart, having achieved full presidential powers, started his Basic Reforms plan (Reformas de Base), which led to a military coup d'état in April 1964.

== See also ==
- 1993 Brazilian constitutional referendum
