= Legality Campaign =

1961 mobilization campaign in Brazil

- Part of the Fourth Brazilian Republic
- 7 September: João Goulart takes the presidential sash as a result of the campaign
- Date: 25 August – 7 September 1961
- Location: Brazil
- Caused by: Resignation of president Jânio Quadros; Military ministers' veto on vice president Goulart's inauguration
- Goals: To comply with the presidential line of succession
- Methods: Demonstrations; Strikes; Media campaigns Military operations
- Result: Inauguration of Goulart; Installation of the parliamentary regime

Parties
Inauguration supporters: Armed Forces (partially); Rio Grande do Sul; Goiás; Paraná	Inauguration opposition: Armed Forces (partially); Guanabara

Lead figures
João Goulart; José M. Lopes; Leonel Brizola; Mauro Borges	Odylio Denys; Sílvio Heck; Gabriel Grün; Carlos Lacerda

The Legality Campaign (Portuguese: Campanha da Legalidade; also known as Legalidade) was a civil and military mobilization in 1961 to ensure the inauguration of João Goulart as President of Brazil, overturning the veto of the Armed Forces' ministers to the legal succession of president Jânio Quadros, who had resigned, to then vice president Goulart. It was led by the governor of Rio Grande do Sul, Leonel Brizola, allied with the commander of the 3rd Army, general José Machado Lopes. The crisis resulted in the adoption of parliamentarism as Brazil's new system of government.

On 25 August 1961, while Goulart was leading a Brazilian trade mission to the People's Republic of China, president Jânio Quadros resigned. Quadros' decision is still not understood, but it was probably a political maneuver to return to the presidency with increased powers, overcoming the political impasse he had with Congress. Quadros expected that, with the rejection to his vice president – elected from a different ticket, due to a peculiarity of the political system at the time – the anti-communist military, which had already rejected Goulart, together with popular pressure, would reverse the resignation. However, the maneuver failed and Quadros left the country. The president of the Chamber of Deputies, Ranieri Mazzilli, took his place temporarily, but the real power remained in the hands of the military ministers, marshal Odílio Denys, minister of war, vice admiral Sílvio Heck, minister of the Navy, and air brigadier Gabriel Grün Moss, minister of the Air Force. Constituting in practice a junta, the three ministers broke the legal order and vetoed the vice president's inauguration, demanding that new elections be held. This veto is characterized as an attempted coup d'état by several historians. (Note: Villa 2004: "It was the second coup attempt in less than a week". Ferreira & Delgado 2019, cap. 11: "The ministers' goal was to gather political support for 'a low-cost coup', pressuring Congress to vote to impeach Goulart. The political parties, however, did not accept the coup". Schwarcz & Starling 2015, cap. 16: "The ministers did not behave like soldiers; they played a political card. They were betting on a kind of constitutional coup, at low cost for the Armed Forces: they were intimidating Congress so that parliamentarians would declare Goulart's impeachment".)

Carlos Lacerda, governor of Guanabara, agreed with the veto, but the ministers did not have enough support in society and the Armed Forces, encountering opposition in demonstrations, strikes and the positions of political figures and organizations. The governors of Goiás, Mauro Borges Teixeira, and Rio Grande do Sul, Leonel Brizola, joined the cause of presidential succession according to the Brazilian Constitution of 1946. Brizola mobilized the population, the Military Brigade of Rio Grande do Sul and radio stations, creating the "Legality Chain" to dominate Brazil's public opinion.

The 3rd Army, headquartered in Porto Alegre, came to the brink of confrontation with the state government, but on 28 August, general Machado Lopes broke with his superiors and turned the powerful land force in the south of the country over to the legalist side. Southern legalists and forces loyal to the military ministers prepared military operations against each other. On one side, troops moved to the southern coast and the northern border of Paraná, and on the other, a land invasion force was formed against the south, the "Cruzeiro Division", and a naval task force headed by the aircraft carrier Minas Gerais. The military was divided, and morale for an invasion against the south was limited. The crisis thus brought the country to the brink of civil war. (Note: Ferreira & Delgado 2019, cap. 11: "After all, following the resignation, the military ministers did not allow Goulart to rise to the Presidency of the Republic, confronting civil and military forces in favor of compliance with the Constitution, which not only generated institutional instability, but also almost plunged the country into a civil war".)

Before any confrontations took place, a conciliatory solution was devised: the adoption of parliamentarianism, which would allow Goulart to take office, but with limited powers. Arriving in Brazil via Porto Alegre on 1 September, Goulart's last obstacle was the plan by dissatisfied officers to shoot down his plane as he flew to Brasília, Operation Mosquito, but he managed to take office on 7 September, completing the campaign's goal. Parliamentarianism was reversed in 1963.

The crisis caused by Jânio Quadros' resignation and the veto to legal succession of João Goulart are among the crises of the Fourth Brazilian Republic that preceded the 1964 coup d'état, along with 1954 (the end of Getúlio Vargas' government) and 1955 (the succession of Juscelino Kubitschek, guaranteed by the 11 November movement). (Note: Ferreira & Delgado 2019, cap. 11: "three moments resulted in situations of great conflict, with the real possibility of civil war in the country: the crisis of August 1954, the preventative coup led by general Henrique Teixeira Lott in November 1955 and the Legality Campaign in August 1961. (...) Crises of the Brazilian Republic.") The 1961 crisis precedes the 1964 coup and is even called its "dress rehearsal". (Note: Pinheiro 2015, p. 48: "For the coup plotters, it served as a dress rehearsal that lined things up for the collapse of democracy in 1964".)

== Background ==
=== 1960 presidential elections ===
Jânio Quadros during his presidential campaign in 1960

The last year of Juscelino Kubitschek's government was marked by economic issues, especially rising inflation and unbalanced public spending. These problems were related to the increase in government spending for the implementation of the Target Plan and the construction of Brasília. In 1959, inflation reached 39.5% per year. In the same year, the candidacies for the upcoming 1960 elections emerged. For the Social Democratic Party (PSD), and supported by the Brazilian Labor Party (PTB), the candidate was general Henrique Lott, who was responsible for the so-called "preventative coup" that ensured Juscelino's inauguration in 1955. For the Social Progressive Party (PSP), the candidate was the populist Ademar de Barros, from São Paulo. Jânio Quadros, then governor of São Paulo, ran for the National Labor Party (PTN), with the initial support of three small parties: the Liberator Party (PL), the Christian Democratic Party (PDC), and the Republican Party (PR).

Carlos Lacerda perceived the attractiveness, especially to the middle class, of Jânio's campaign promises, based on the fight against corruption, inflation control, reduction of the cost of living, expenditure restraint and public austerity. Under his influence, the National Democratic Union (UDN) supported Quadros in order to win the elections – dominated until then by the PSD and PTB. Jânio's anti-politics message, which expressed a deep disdain for traditional politicians, attracted the middle class, tormented by the effects of inflation, who saw in the candidate the incarnation of an energetic manager capable of efficiently commanding the Brazilian economy.

His opponent Lott, although respected, did not generate enthusiasm and alienated the PSD, by proposing the vote for illiterates; and the PTB, by criticizing Cuba and communism. Realizing the candidate's weakness, PSD and PTB bet on the "Jan–Jan" slate: Jânio Quadros for president and João Goulart, of the PTB, for vice-president; the two positions were elected separately. The result was the election of Jânio Quadros, with 5,636,623 votes (against 3,846,825 for Lott), and of Goulart, with 4,547,010 votes.

=== Jânio Quadros' government ===
Sworn into office in 1961, Jânio Quadros had no majority in Congress and sought no parliamentary support, running the country without a solid political base. He snubbed Congress, which he called a "club of idlers", and provoked politicians, especially from the PSD and PTB, with investigations into scandals involving public money. In response, a congressional commission began investigating the presidential inquiries. The vice president himself appeared in a leaked report of one of the investigations. He retaliated by accusing the government of publishing it for political purposes, and distanced himself from Quadros.

The new economic policy sought a painful adjustment program to lay the foundations for future development. Measures such as exchange rate devaluation, spending cuts, credit restriction and withdrawal of import subsidies, the latter leading to a 100% increase in the price of bread and fuel, were bound to be unpopular, but seemed possible with the euphoria of the election. The program pleased the International Monetary Fund (IMF), allowing the renegotiation of debts, which had not been possible during Juscelino Kubitschek's government, the foreign creditors, and the Kennedy administration in the United States, which, knowing the fragility of Brazilian finances, wanted to favor Quadros' government to avoid instability and the advance of communism. By August, the influence of developmentalist advisors in the government had begun to weaken the program, but its result was to sharpen the opposition from the left.

At the international level, the so-called Independent Foreign Policy (PEI) was implemented. The PEI was marked by a reformulation of alignment with the U.S., the reestablishment of diplomatic relations with several Eastern European countries, including the Soviet Union, a more favorable attitude towards Cuba, and approchement with Third World countries. Jânio's government also distanced itself from an old ally, Portugal, and began to support the independence of Angola and Mozambique, while criticizing South African apartheid.

If internally the economic policy displeased the left, the independent foreign policy bothered conservative and center sectors. UDN was also irritated, because the government acted without consulting its parliamentary leadership, and to the PEI's aggravation was added Jânio's sympathy to agrarian reform. Carlos Lacerda, now governor of Guanabara, went from being a supporter to a staunch opponent of the government. Congress remained under the control of the PSD and PTB. Attempts to reconcile conflicting interests failed and the president was left politically isolated.

=== Last days in power ===
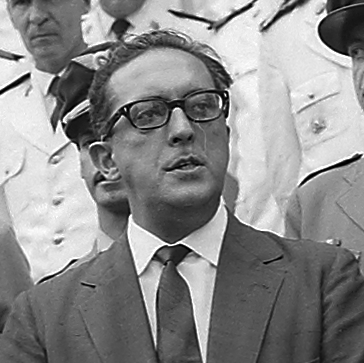
Carlos Lacerda, governor of Guanabara

In July, Jânio invited his vice president Goulart to lead a Brazilian mission to the People's Republic of China. The offer, transmitted by Foreign Minister Afonso Arinos, had initially been sent to José Ermírio de Moraes, who declined. Goulart accepted the invitation with suspicion, since he had broken with the president. The entourage left at the end of the month, making stops in Paris and Moscow. Their objectives were commercial, seeking to expand Brazilian markets abroad. In Chinese territory Goulart defended solidarity among Third World countries and praised the Chinese national development, expressing a Third Worldist view. Although previously calculated, the statements were seen in the West as supporting communism. (Note: "Brazil and China will march together for the prosperity and independence of all peoples of Asia, Africa and Latin America and fight against imperialism to win lasting peace." "People's China, under the leadership of the great leader Mao Zedong, is a reality and an example that explains how a people who suffered the contempt of others for many centuries in the past could emancipate themselves from the yoke of exploiters. (...) As someone closely connected with the glorious struggles of the workers' communities in my country, I want to express my deep appreciation to the workers, both in the countryside and in the city, for their heroic and extraordinary participation in building a free and powerful New China." "Long live the ever closer friendship between the People's China and the United States of Brazil!" "Long live the friendship of the Asian, African and Latin American peoples!")

On 18 August, while Goulart was away, Carlos Lacerda sought out the president in Brasília for an urgent meeting: he conveyed his intention to resign from the government of Guanabara in order to deal with the bankruptcy of his newspaper Tribuna da Imprensa. He also conferred with Justice Minister Oscar Pedroso Horta, returning the next morning. On the same day Jânio decorated Che Guevara with the Order of the Southern Cross, Brazil's highest decoration for foreign personalities. The negative reactions, including from Lacerda and the UDN, were many, and officers decorated with the order threatened to return it.

On 22 August, in the TV Excelsior auditorium, in São Paulo, Lacerda declared that he would not resign and accused Jânio of articulating a coup and having invited him to participate. José Aparecido de Oliveira, Jânio's secretary, wanted to travel to Rio de Janeiro and accuse Lacerda himself of a coup, so that the next day he would be fired, but neutralizing the governor of Guanabara. As reporters heard the authorization to travel to Rio, the plan became unfeasible. On the night of the 24th, the anniversary of Getúlio Vargas' suicide, Lacerda made a big impact in the media: he accused Jânio of, through the Minister of Justice, having requested his support for a "cabinet coup" to strengthen the Executive branch, possibly involving the military ministers. Lacerda also claimed Horta had requested copies of his articles written after Vargas' suicide, in which he argued for an exceptional regime. The next day Pedroso Horta denied the accusations, also arguing that "if I were conspiring, I would never call to participate in this conspiracy a man who is known as the country's greatest blabbermouth".

On the morning of Friday, 25 August, the president communicated his intention to resign to a few aides, adding that it would be irrevocable, and then to the ministers. Those of War, Navy, and the Air Force asked, without success, that he give up the decision. Odílio Denys, of the Ministry of War, noted the president's prestige within the Brazilian Army, but heard that there would be no turning back. Jânio asked them: "maintain order throughout the country", or, "with this Congress I cannot govern. Organize a junta and run the country". At eleven o'clock Quadros traveled to São Paulo, where some governors also asked him to remain in power, but he stated that the resignation was irrevocable. The resignation letter was read at 15:00 to the astonished congressmen. Deemed a unilateral act, it was accepted within two hours. On 28 August, the now former president left the country for Europe.

Still late in the afternoon of 25 August, in Rio de Janeiro, a small crowd gathered at the bust of Getúlio Vargas in Cinelândia. Calling for the return of Jânio Quadros, they broke the glass windows of the American Embassy and were dispersed by Carlos Lacerda's Military Police. At night, the Tribuna da Imprensa, O Globo and Diário de Notícias were depredated, with shouts against Lacerda and in favor of Jânio Quadros. The Leopoldina Railroad workers started a strike for Jânio's return, which was soon interrupted. However, Janism's capacity for popular mobilization went out of the window, following the reasoning of Castilho Cabral, president of the Jânio Quadros Popular Movement: "we are neither rioters nor the auxiliary line of the communists".

=== The reasoning behind resignation ===
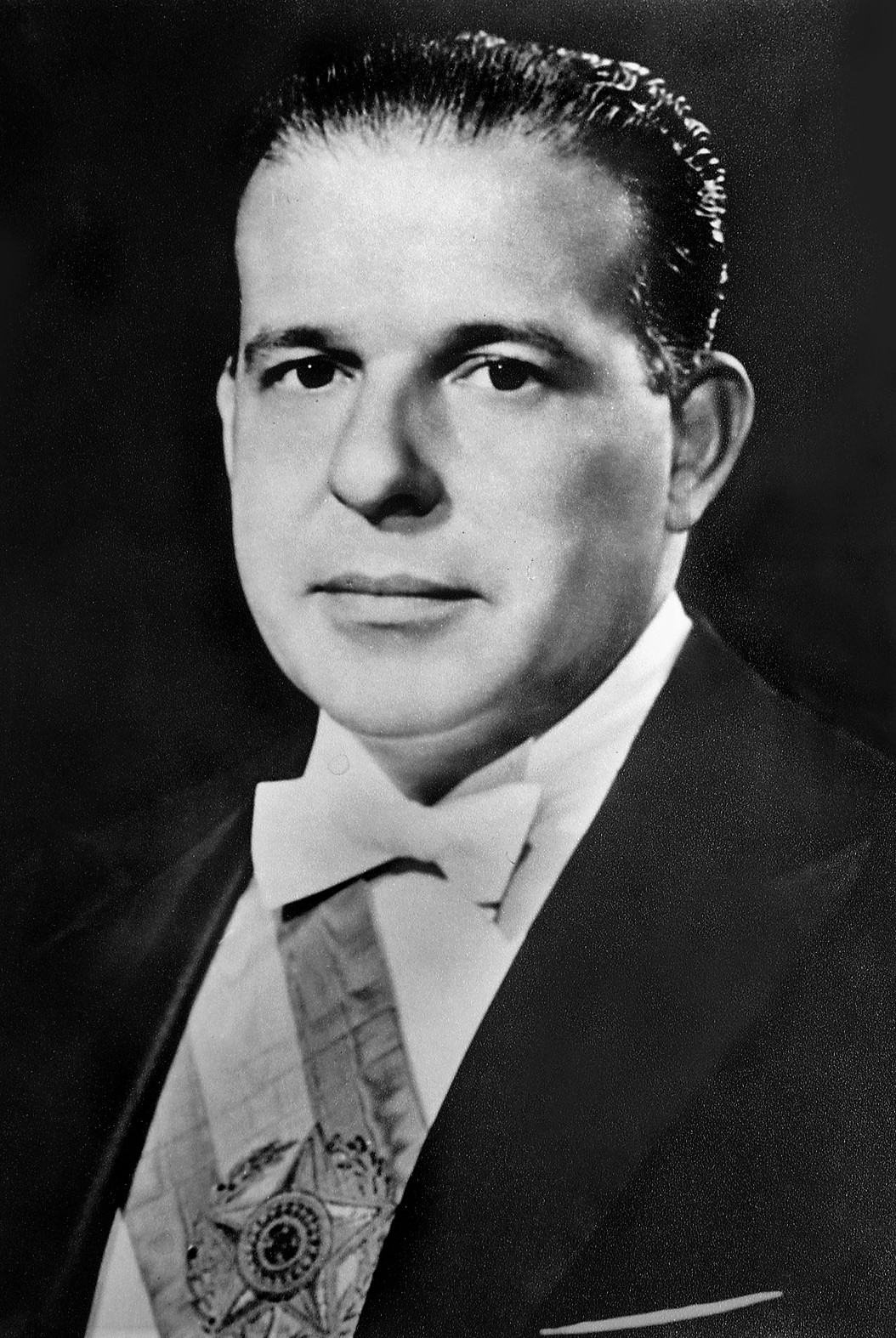
Vice president João Goulart

The resignation surprised the country. Jânio alluded to pressure from "terrible forces", but did not fully clarify his decision. Statements and memories are self-interested and contradictory. There are several interpretations: international pressure, psychological imbalance, and a coup attempt by the president himself. Against the first hypothesis, there is the argument based on the prestige of the Quadros' administration among foreign creditors for following the IMF recommendations. Against the second, the argument is that the image of a buffoon associated with Jânio was a political strategy used by himself and his opposition. The consensus among historians is that it was a political maneuver or coup to return to the presidency with increased powers, overcoming resistance from Congress. According to Afonso Arinos in a book written together with Jânio himself,

first, the resignation would take place; second, a succession vacuum would open – since João Goulart, far away in China, would not be allowed by the military forces to take office, and, therefore, the country would remain at a standstill; third, either a formula would be adopted, as a result of which he himself would emerge as the first president, but already within the new institutional regime, or else, without him, the armed forces would take charge of setting up this new regime, and it would then be up to another citizen – chosen by whatever means – to preside over the country under the new viable and operative scheme: as, in everything, what mattered was the institutional reform, not the individual or individuals who would promote it, by sacrificing himself, or not sacrificing himself, the essential would be achieved.

— Jânio Quadros e Afonso Arinos de Melo Franco. História do Povo Brasileiro. Volume 6. São Paulo: J. Quadros Editôres Culturais, 1967, pp. 241–242

Sending the vice president to China "certainly was part of his plans", by creating the aggravating factor of being in a communist country, impose a gap of several days before he could arrive in Brazil and, while away, prevent him from articulating his return. The core of the strategy would be the opposition of conservatives and the military to Goulart's inauguration. However, historian Hélio Silva contextualized the trip to China as the result of an invitation extended to Goulart when he visited the USSR, still in Juscelino's government; this trip did not harm his candidacy. During Jânio's government the invitation was repeated, and since the government already intended to send a trade mission, Goulart was selected.

Jânio had favored officers of the "internationalist" wing (Note: According to Atassio 2007, p. 41, the Military Club elections were disputed by "nationalists" and "internationalists". The former defended industrialization with a strong state presence, social democracy, and had sympathies for communism, with some even supporting it. The latter defended industrialization with the presence of foreign capital, liberal democracy and Christian values, having an "elitist and anti-mobilizing character, being particularly bothered by the participation of workers in national politics.) and linked to the anti-communist Democratic Crusade faction within the Armed Forces, including the military ministers – marshal Odílio Denys, admiral Silvio Heck, and brigadier Gabriel Grün Moss – and the Chief of Staff of the Armed Forces, the historical coup plotter Cordeiro de Farias. On one hand, Jânio excited many military men with his personalism, support from the UDN and promises of moralization of politics and fight against corruption; on the other hand, Goulart faced opposition in the higher ranks since, as Vargas' Minister of Labor, he was overthrown by the Colonels' Manifesto. Goulart had proposed a 100% increase in the minimum wage, which would reach the pay of a second lieutenant, which, for the military, would subvert recruitment. The military of the "internationalist" wing deemed Goulart unprepared and associated with Vargas, Brizola, the left and revolutionary ideas.

The opposition of the military would be added to the popular mobilization, even in a new Queremismo, and of the governors. Congress would only evaluate the resignation after the weekend, and Jânio would end up returning, with a weakened Congress and parties. According to Moniz Bandeira, the new regime would be a form of civilian Bonapartism, that is, a State with autonomy of action in relation to the social classes, including the dominant one. The coup intentions possibly existed since several months before the resignation. Jânio was labeled an authoritarian by the opposition and may have identified as his options the alignment of foreign and domestic policies, either to please the left or the right, or to rise above political and social factions. However, by stating that the resignation was irrevocable, closing the doors to his return, Jânio made his decision more difficult to understand. On the other hand, in São Paulo he would have said: "I won't do anything to come back, but I consider my return inevitable".

The plan failed: there was not the pressure for his return and PSD and PTB did not miss the opportunity to return to power through the vice president. The resignation in Congress could have been delayed if just one of the deputies had called for the signature investigation, but they were displeased by the inquiries. Neither the left nor the right wanted to defend the president. There was no popular movement organized enough to reverse the resignation and the military, although willing to bar Goulart from taking office, thought they could do it without Jânio.

== Succession impasse ==
=== Goulart's inauguration veto ===
Odílio Denys, Minister of War

According to the Brazilian Constitution of 1946, in force at the time:

Article. 79 – The Vice President of the Republic will replace the President, in the event of impediment, and succeed him, in the event of a vacancy.

§ 1 – In case of impediment or vacancy of the President and Vice President of the Republic, the President of the House of Representatives, the Vice President of the Federal Senate, and the President of the Supreme Federal Court shall be called successively to the exercise of the Presidency.

Since vice president Goulart was absent (in the early morning of 26 August he was still in Singapore, beginning his return to the country), the president of the Chamber of Deputies, Ranieri Mazzilli, immediately occupied the Planalto Palace. Mazzilli held his first meeting on 28 August, and appointed Floriano Augusto Ramos to the Civilian Cabinet, Ernesto Geisel to the Military Cabinet, and José Martins Rodrigues to the Ministry of Justice.

However, the de facto power was in the hands of a junta consisting of marshal Denys, admiral Heck and brigadier Moss, whose goal was that new elections would be held within 60 days, with Mazzilli occupying the presidency on an interim basis. They imposed an unofficial state of emergency. Planes that landed were frisked, tanks were waiting at the airport in Brasilia and the roads to the airports were occupied by the Armed Forces, all to prevent the vice president from entering the country. Congress discussed the clear legal succession for Goulart, the possibilities of him not taking over, and the military veto of his inauguration, which was officially conveyed on 28 August through Ranieri Mazzilli:

Your Excellency the President of the National Congress

I have the honor to inform you that, in the presentation of the current political situation created by the resignation of president Jânio Quadros, the Military Ministers, as Chiefs of the Armed Forces, responsible for internal order, have expressed to me the absolute inconvenience, for reasons of national security, of the return to the country of vice president João Belchior Marques Goulart.

Mazzilli transmitted another communiqué to the Brazilian people. When asked by a delegation of labor congressmen what would happen if Goulart landed on Brazilian soil to take power, Odílio Denys replied: "he will be arrested". Just as in 1955, when, under pressure from the Minister of War, Congress voted to remove president Carlos Luz from office, the junta's objective was that Congress, intimidated, would declare Goulart's impeachment, effecting a coup of low political cost for the military. However, not even the UDN accepted it, and on 29 August Congress rejected the impeachment request.

The political events of the 1960s that would culminate in the 1964 coup occurred in the context of the polarization between capitalism and socialism, with the Cold War and the Cuban Revolution of 1959. For the military who attempted the veto, Goulart would not only cause chaos and disorder but was also linked to international communism, having ideological alignment with regimes like China, and could even lead to the implantation of this system in Brazil.

Odílio Denys thus clarified his actions: "the time has come to choose between communism and democracy". A manifesto published on 30 August reiterated the military ministers' position, citing Goulart's encouragement of "successive and frequent agitations in union circles", accusing him of declaring support for communist regimes, and noting the "proven intervention of international communism in the life of democratic nations, and above all in the weakest ones. It postulated that "In the Presidency of the Republic, in a regime that attributes ample authority and personal power to the head of the government, Mr. João Goulart will constitute, without any doubt, the most evident incentive to all those who wish to see the country plunged into chaos, anarchy, and civil strife. The Armed Forces themselves, domesticated and infiltrated, would be transformed, as has happened in other countries, into simple communist militias". Written by Golbery do Couto e Silva, the document opened the possibility of a parliamentarian solution ("in a regime that attributes ample authority and personal power to the head of the government").

=== Opposition of forces ===
With the rapid abandonment of attempts to get Jânio's government back, the issue became Goulart's inauguration. While a commission of parliamentarians studied a constitutional solution, the country was divided between opponents of the inauguration – part of the Armed Forces loyal to the military ministers and conservative civilians – and legalists in favor of the inauguration, who found their greatest strength in the south of the country, with the governor of Rio Grande do Sul, Leonel Brizola, and, after a few days, the commander of the 3rd Army, general Machado Lopes.

The four armies present in the country were respectively commanded by generals Nestor Souto de Oliveira (1st Army, Rio de Janeiro), Osvaldo de Araújo Mota (2nd Army, São Paulo), José Machado Lopes (3rd Army, Porto Alegre) and Artur da Costa e Silva (4th Army, Recife). With the exception of the 3rd, the commanders of the other three armies and of the Amazon and Planalto military commands were loyal to the Minister of War. The War Minister's chief of staff was Orlando Geisel.

The state governments accepted the power of the military ministers, with the exception of Piauí, which ignored it, and Rio Grande do Sul and Goiás, which mounted opposition. Carlos Lacerda, from Guanabara, stood out among the governors as the one who most opposed the legalists. The mayors of Recife, Miguel Arraes, and of São Paulo, Prestes Maia, defended constitutional inauguration. Abreu Sodré, a member of the UDN and president of the Legislative Assembly of São Paulo, organized the Democratic Legality Front with several sectors of São Paulo society. The now senator Juscelino Kubitschek warned Denys: "do not insist in opposing the law and the will of the people", while UDN deputy Adauto Lúcio Cardoso called for the impeachment of Ranieri Mazzilli and the military ministers for high crime.

In Minas Gerais the ranks for legality were swelled by the students of the Law School of Belo Horizonte and the Federation of Catholic Worker Youth. In Niterói and the rest of Rio de Janeiro several workers went on strike. These movements were influenced by the decision taken in Rio Grande do Sul. The legalist cause was embraced by the Order of Attorneys of Brazil, the National Student Union, the Nationalist Parliamentary Front, the Episcopal Conference of Brazil, the Democratic Resistance Front, formed by students and union leaders, and intellectuals such as Alceu Amoroso Lima, Aurélio Buarque de Holanda, Darcy Ribeiro, Jorge Amado, and Diná Silveira de Queirós. Commercial and professional associations also defended Goulart's inauguration. The coalition included leftist, nationalist and conservative groups, including part of the PSD and UDN and business associations such as the Council of Production Classes (CONCLAP).

In the press, the inauguration was defended in Correio da Manhã, Jornal do Brasil and most newspapers; Diário de Notícias, for example, considered that Goulart put the democratic regime at risk, but it would be worse to disregard the Constitution in order to prevent his inauguration, and the regime would be able to control any risk in his presidency. O Globo, while suggesting a conciliatory solution, did not condemn the military veto, and Carlos Lacerda's Tribuna da Imprensa defended the junta's decision.

== Events in Guanabara ==
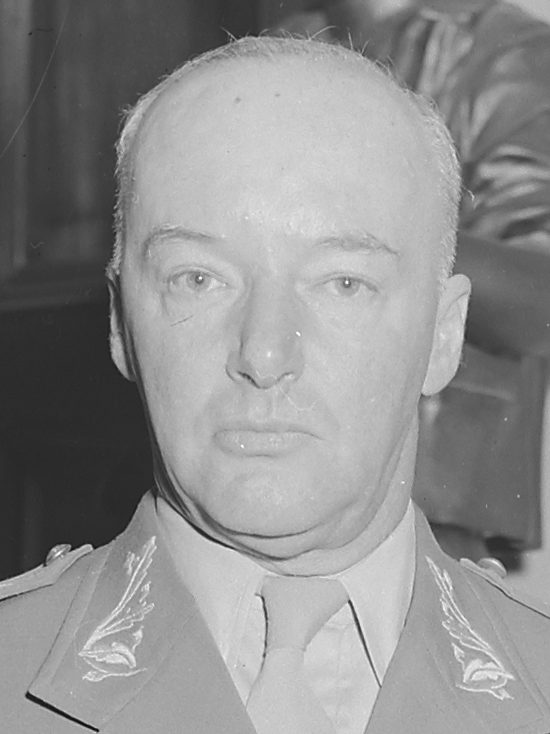
Marshal Lott

In Rio de Janeiro, marshal Henrique Teixeira Lott, who was not active but had prestige, positioned himself on the night of 25 August in favor of the inauguration. He published a manifesto calling on "all living forces in the country, the forces of production and thought, the students and intellectuals, the workers and the people in general", besides the "noble comrades of the Armed Forces", to defend the legal succession and prevent the "abnormal and arbitrary solution that is intended to be imposed on the nation". His house was frequented by legalists, including military personnel such as Osvino Ferreira Alves, Nélson de Melo, and Jair Dantas Ribeiro. Lott even argued with Odílio Denys, his former ally, over the phone, but he only repeatedly answered "I'm listening"; general Olímpio Mourão Filho reported that Denys rejected Goulart's inauguration because he considered him a communist. Congressman Armando Falcão, leader of the PSD, was there on Saturday morning and reported that Lott did not contest the arguments he made against the inauguration, attributing his position to pressure from other officers. But still on the 25th Lott had declared to journalists that the right thing to do was to comply with the Constitution.

Lott's house was surrounded by the Military Police, and he was arrested on Sunday morning, 27 August, and taken to Fort Laje. A radio message picked up by the 3rd Army justified the measure in the following terms: "Congress communist elements are disturbing the finding [of a] legal solution [to the] crisis arising [from the] resignation [of the] president. Marshal Lott involved by such agitators [has] launched [a] subversive manifesto forcing [the] Minister [of] War to order his arrest." Other military personnel arrested included Lott's former aide-de-camp captain William Stockler Pinto, majors Frederico Augusto Ferreira e Sousa and Correia Lima, colonel Jefferson Cardim Osório, lieutenant colonel Pamplona, lieutenant colonel Antônio Joaquim Figueiredo, admiral Silva Junior and brigadier Francisco Teixeira. Brazilian Navy ships were used for imprisonment.

In an opinion poll conducted by Ibope in Guanabara and published on 2 September, 91% of respondents were in favor of Goulart's inauguration, and 9% against it. But the presence of the Armed Forces was ominous: the Air Force at the airports, Praça XV and Brazil's Mint, the navy at the port's wharf, Praça Mauá, Navy Arsenal and all along the seashore, and the army at the train stations, newspaper offices and embassies. The Federal Service of Information and Counterintelligence (Sfici) established censorship, interrupting the live broadcasting of Lott's manifesto by Rádio Continental. Carlos Lacerda's government participated in the censorship – telephonic, telegraphic and radiotelegraphic – which had begun by censoring a statement by minister Horta, and the distribution of his Military Police personnel throughout Rio de Janeiro accompanied that of the Army. In opposition of his party, the UDN, where there were also opponents of the military ministers, his Tribuna da Imprensa defined his position this way:

Today more than ever Brazilians are faced with two paths: democracy and communism. The Armed Forces with their tradition of democracy and freedom, and faithful to the supreme interests of Brazil and its people, are determined to [...] ensure that Brazil follows its path and its destiny as a free country. [...] The duty of the people, therefore, is to help the Armed Forces to guarantee freedom and peace.

— Tribuna da Imprensa, 29 August 1961, p. 1

Despite the speech of "order, tranquility, social peace and the union of Brazilians obedient to the Armed Forces" the strongest repression was in Guanabara, conducted by both federal and state forces. The demonstrations in Cinelândia continued in the days after the resignation. The Military Police, the Surveillance Police Station and the Department of Political and Social Police (DPPS) dispersed the demonstrators with batons, tear gas bombs and, later, machine guns, even shooting several people. On 29 August, the police, unable to control the square, began to make arbitrary arrests. Unions were invaded and their leaders arrested. Issues of Jornal do Brasil, Correio da Manhã, Diário da Noite and Gazeta da Noite were seized, and Última Hora and Diário Carioca even had their facilities occupied. Tribuna da Imprensa was the only newspaper without interference.

== Legality in Rio Grande do Sul ==
=== Alignment of forces ===
==== Governor's definition ====
External videos
- Hymn of Legality

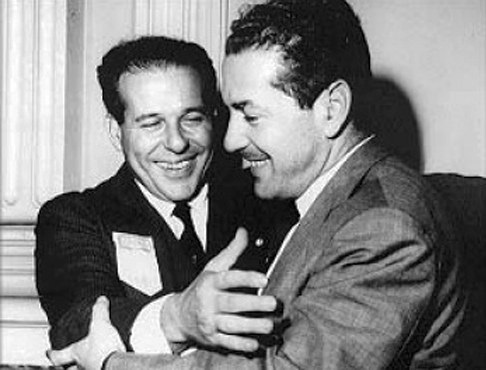
João Goulart (left) with Leonel Brizola, governor of Rio Grande do Sul (right)

After Jânio Quadros' resignation, both the Military Brigade and the 3rd Army occupied strategic points in Porto Alegre, in some cases at odds with each other. Street demonstrations broke out, at first for Jânio's return. Machado Lopes reprimanded general Peri Constant Bevilacqua, commander of the 3rd Infantry Division (3rd DI) in Santa Maria, who had sent a telegram to Jânio asking him to reconsider the resignation. Governor Brizola, at first, interpreted the resignation as a coup against Jânio and thought about inviting him to resist in his state. However, on the morning of 26 August he was informed through the labor deputy from Rio Grande do Sul, Rui Ramos, that the Minister of War would not allow Goulart to enter the country and take office.

That day a manifesto was defined. Dating back to the beginning of the crisis, it still paid attention to Jânio's resignation, while addressing the "military solution" to the succession in a generic way, but making clear its "unalterable position on the side of constitutional legality"; "We will not collude with coups or violence against the constitutional order and against public liberties". It clarified that "the environment in the State is one of order". It also mentioned maintaining contact with military personnel.

The first was general Machado Lopes. Brizola tried to convince him in favor of Goulart's inauguration, but the 3rd Army commander limited himself to answering: "governor, I can't compromise myself like that. I am a soldier and I stay with the army". After the call, the governor told his aides that "nobody will make the coup by telephone!" Brizola contacted several military personnel around the country. In Rio de Janeiro he spoke with Osvino Ferreira Alves, who could do nothing: Osvino had no troops and was targeted for his nationalist positions. Amaury Kruel, also with no command of troops, accepted the call to Porto Alegre, where he could take Machado Lopes' place if the 3rd Army remained opposed to the governor. Several important officers refused to break with the military ministers, such as Costa e Silva in Recife.

However, Brizola managed to contact Lott before he was arrested, and received recommendations from allies in Rio Grande do Sul: generals Bevilacqua, from the 3rd DI, and Oromar Osório, from the 1st Cavalry Division (1st DC) in Uruguaiana, as well as colonels Roberto Osório and Assis Brasil. Besides Santa Maria and Uruguaiana, contacts were extended to commanders in Santana do Livramento, Cruz Alta and other cities in the interior.

With military allies and popular demonstrations in Porto Alegre for Goulart's inauguration, Brizola was able to start his Legality Campaign. Through the Farroupilha and Guaíba radios, at three in the morning of 27 August he declared himself ready to defend the constitutional succession with force:

Rio Grande do Sul will not allow attacks. The resignation of Mr. Jânio Quadros is definitive. It now remains to inaugurate the constitutional president of Brazil. It remains to hand over the presidency to João Goulart. [...] We, who govern Rio Grande do Sul, will not accept any coups. We will not passively watch any attacks on public freedoms and constitutional order. We will react as we can. Even if we're to be crushed. But we will defend our honor and our traditions. The Constitution of the country must be respected.

By this point the civilians in the Piratini Palace had received Taurus 38 revolvers. The Military Brigade distributed its armaments: soldiers and corporals with carbines and INA submachine guns, sergeants with carbines 30 and officers with Colt 45 pistols. Brizola personally wielded a submachine gun. Other weapons of the Military Brigade were the Schwarzlose machine gun, the Ceskoslovenzká Zbrojovka (FMZB) machine gun, and the Royal automatic pistol. Some of the armaments had been waiting in the stocks since the government of Flores da Cunha, in the 1930s, and were of dubious reliability. For the last time in history, the Military Brigade was structured as a combat unit. At the time, it had combat and guerrilla training, without the focus on ostensible policing. Its officers were still military-minded and enthusiastically embraced a return to their original state army role. Brizola also asked Taurus for three thousand 38 revolvers. The Telephone Company was militarily occupied and Varig's air transport was brought under control.

A "state of collective exaltation" emerged in Rio Grande do Sul, with much of the population in the streets, especially around the Piratini Palace. Many volunteered to defend the state government. In the Mata-borrão exhibition hall, located on the corner of the Borges de Medeiros and Andrade Neves avenues, the "Central Committee of the Movement of Democratic Resistance" was established, unifying dozens of committees. Until the night of 30 August it had about 45,000 volunteers. The civilian population made its vehicles available for the cause, forming the "legality fleet". In the interior of the state legalist committees had thousands of volunteers. The air clubs patrolled the border with their small planes. The Allied Hotel was made available to serve as a hospital for combatants, volunteers donated blood and women presented themselves as nursing auxiliaries.

Meanwhile, Machado Lopes informed the Ministry of War of the situation by radio. At 01:20 he reported that the situation was "tense but calm": Brizola would resist against any impediment to João Goulart's inauguration, he had mobilized the Military Brigade and had part of the officialdom on his side, including the commanders of the 1st DC and 3rd DI. At 03:04 Odílio Denys answered, reporting Lott's arrest and ordering the two legalist division commanders in Porto Alegre to be detained. At 03:10 Machado Lopes replied: "Understood, I'll do it. [The] situation [in] Porto Alegre [is] very tense. Governor Brizola has organized a palace defense and seems to have distributed civilian arms to his supporters. I am vigilant in maintaining order. It would all be convenient to find a legal solution."

==== Legality Chain ====
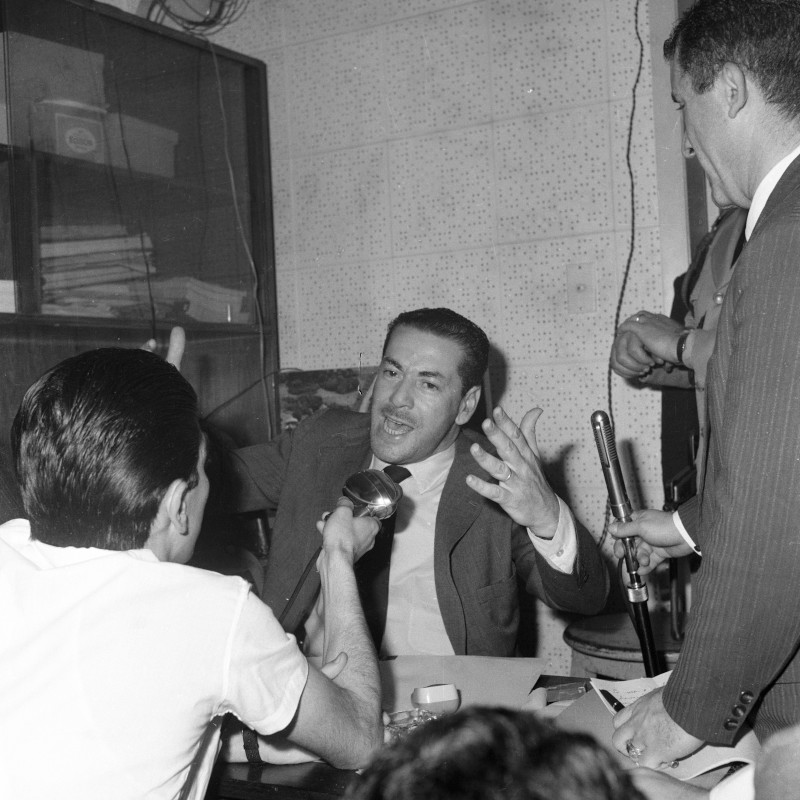
Brizola speaking at the Legality Chain on 27 August 1961

Brizola's speech precipitated events, turning his state into the center of resistance against the military ministers. In response, the Minister of War ordered the crystals of several radio stations in Porto Alegre to be sealed, leading to the federal government's closing down of the Capital, Farroupilha, and Difusora radio stations, which broadcast the governor's manifestos. Brizola officially reacted by requisitioning Rádio Guaíba, which was occupied at noon on 27 August by a Civil Guard riot squad armed with machine guns. The radio station became available to the Secretariat of Security and the studios were transferred to the Piratini Palace itself. The transmitters on Ilha da Pintada were protected by two hundred men from the Military Brigade, including three heavy machine guns, and Fire Department speedboats. Engineer Homero Simon connected the lines from the Piratini basements to Ilha da Pintada.

150 other radio stations in the state, country and abroad were united in the Cadeia Radiofônica da Legalidade (Legality Radio Chain), broadcasting speeches on shortwave. To defeat the military ministers, popular and military support in Rio Grande do Sul was insufficient, and so the Legality Chain was the instrument needed to mobilize the rest of the country.

Under orders from the Minister of War, twice the 3rd Army planned operations to silence the Legality Chain, but in both Machado Lopes gave up the execution. According to journalist Flávio Tavares, general Antonio Carlos Murici, Chief of Staff of the 3rd Army, thought of an amphibious attack, but during reconnaissance the discovery of a machine gun aimed at the river by the defenders made the plan unfeasible. In Murici's own statement, the only mention of a discarded plan is that of cutting the bridge's electrical wiring and keeping a platoon in place. The south of Rio Grande do Sul would be left without electricity, but the radio would be silenced. He presented the plan to Machado Lopes, who rejected it.

The land invasion, on the other hand, went further. It would be executed by a force from the Guard Company, a unit specialized in rapid assaults and armed with submachine guns. Around midnight on 27 August, Machado Lopes called his commander, captain Pedro Américo Leal, and ordered him to remove the crystal from the Guaíba radio transmitter. The captain argued against the operation, as it would incur casualties, and suggested cutting off the city's electricity, water, and telephone as an alternative in order to take over the radio in the morning, but Machado Lopes insisted. At dawn the company was called, but Machado Lopes changed his mind and canceled the operation. Colonel Emílio Nerme, Brizola's sub-chief of the Military Cabinet, evaluated that the attack would fail against the experienced Military Brigade. For Pedro Américo, it would succeed, but with casualties, since the enemy would be on the defense. For Murici, a violent clash would occur with victory for the army, since the unit would be outnumbered, but with a firepower advantage.

==== Orders against Brizola ====
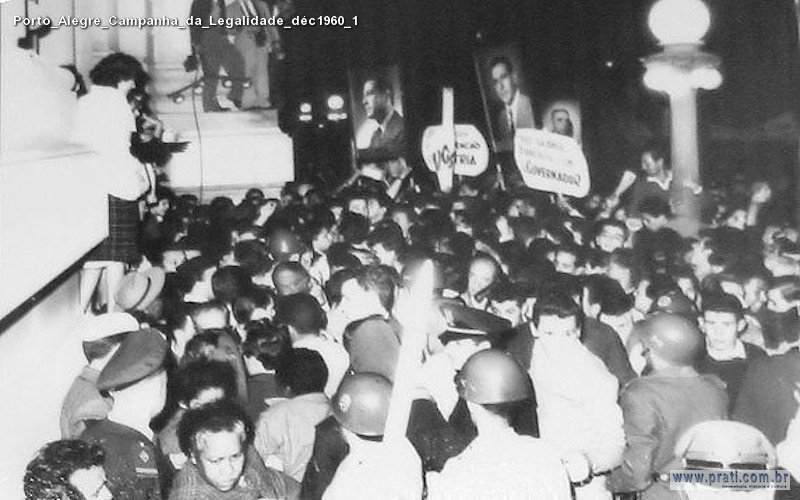
Piratini Palace, in Porto Alegre, during the Legality Campaign

On 27 August, the Military Brigade was mobilized. The Piratini Palace and its surroundings – the Metropolitan Cathedral of Porto Alegre, the Farroupilha Palace and Matriz Square – dawned fortified by the brigade, with sandbags, rolls of barbed wire, machine guns, including on the roof of the palace and the cathedral's tower, and trucks bringing armaments. Thousands of people were in the square.

The telephony was non-secret and the state government and the 3rd Army were able to monitor each other's calls. On the afternoon of 27 August, a Post and Telegraph employee picked up the following radio message, sent by Murici from the 3rd Army HQ to Ernesto Geisel, in Brasília:

I report that the 3rd Army intercepted a message from the governor addressed to Dr. Jango, offering troops from Rio Grande to be sent by air to Brasilia, in order to guarantee his inauguration. The governor is arming the people and promoting agitations in the interior of the state. Due to strong tension, it is possible that a minor incident could trigger civil war, with serious consequences. Repression operations are ready to be unleashed at the appropriate moment.

Still on Sunday, the commander of the 5th Air Zone, brigadier João Aureliano Passos, informed Machado Lopes of the order received from the Minister of Aeronautics: to fly low over the Piratini Palace to intimidate Brizola and silence the Legality Chain. Passos refused to carry out the order. At 05:00 on Monday, he appeared at the 3rd Army HQ, where he explained that the flight could agitate the population, provoking a civil war. At 09:45 the 3rd Army received the following message by radio:

1 – General Orlando Geisel transmits to general Machado Lopes, commander of the Third Army, the following order from the Minister of War:

The 3rd Army must immediately compel Mr. Leonel Brizola to put an end to the subversive action he has been developing, which translates into the displacement and concentration of troops and other measures that are the exclusive responsibility of the Armed Forces.

The governor has thus placed himself outside of legality. The commander of the 3rd Army should act with maximum energy and promptness.

2. Have all troops from Rio Grande do Sul converge on Porto Alegre, including the 5th Infantry Division, if necessary.

3. Employ the air force, including a bombardment, if necessary.

4 – A Navy task force is on its way to Rio Grande do Sul.

5 – How many troop reinforcements do you need? (Note: The rest of the message: "6 – Here is a rumor that General Muricy would come to Rio. The Minister of War does not want to believe this news and believes that the time is no longer for parliamentarians, but requires firm and immediate action. 7 – The Minister of War trusts that the troops of the 3rd Army will do their duty.")

Machado Lopes replied, "I only fulfill orders within the current Constitution". Orlando Geisel asked "how is this order unconstitutional?", but the 3rd Army commander had already left the station. Later, Orlando and Ernesto Geisel denied the existence of the order, and there is no document in the Army archives. According to Machado Lopes, the absence of the document is expected from a radio order, but it had five witnesses. (Note: Markun & Urchoeguia 2017, ch. 9. "At 9:45 a.m. on Monday, the 28th, the order was reiterated by means audio, the exclusive radio system that interconnected the barracks, in a reception witnessed by the following officers: general Murici; colonel Virgílio Cordeiro de Melo, acting commander of the 3rd Military Region; major Harry Alberto Schnardnorf, assistant to the head of the MS; captain Luís Omar de Carvalho, the commander's aide-de-camp; and major Álcio Barbosa da Costa e Silva, head of the Communications Service and son of the future president of the Republic, Artur da Costa e Silva. The group was in the Communications room of the headquarters.") Among them, Murici confirmed that Denys' order was "Use the aviation, going as far as bombing if necessary"; he emphasized that they were two separate orders, one from minister Grün Moss and one from minister Denys. The fear of the bombing of the Piratini Palace involved a confusion between the two orders. His assistant, major Schnarndorf, claimed that there was an order to use force against the palace. According to the head of the Communications Service, Álcio Barbosa da Costa e Silva, the order was "Take the Piratini Palace, arrest governor Brizola, resorting to bombing, if necessary". Costa e Silva added that Orlando Geisel condemned the requisition of the radio stations for the Legality Chain, because "the granting power is the Federal Government".

==== Confrontation with the 3rd Army ====
The archbishop of Porto Alegre, Vicente Scherer, and mayor José Loureiro da Silva asked the 3rd Army to avoid conflict. The mayor, an enemy of Goulart, mentioned: "I think the best thing is to give investiture to Jango, because he is a coward. He takes over and then, depending on what he does, he overthrows himself".

From midnight on, the Piratini Palace prepared for an imminent attack by federal forces. From 02:30 on 28 August, the creaking of the tracks of the 3rd Army tanks could be heard in Porto Alegre. The 2nd Mechanized Reconnaissance Regiment had its armored cars on the Mauá and Praia das Belas avenues. (Note: "2nd Motomechanized Cavalry Regiment" in the source. Pedrosa 2018, Appendix 3 indicates the mechanized regiment in the capital.) In the legalist trenches was the Bento Gonçalves Regiment, responsible for the security of the Piratini Palace, reinforced by other detachments, totaling 300 men from the Military Brigade under colonel Átila Escobar. The civilians were also armed, and trucks, jeeps and official cars blocked the streets. Despite the military inferiority compared to the 3rd Army, there was a will to resist.

Piratini realized the War Minister's order for the attack on the state government at the same time it was informed that general Machado Lopes wanted to visit it to negotiate. The pressure reached its peak. Before the visit, which took place around 11:00, Brizola went to the microphone and spoke on the radio chain. Announcing the coming of Machado Lopes, he stated what would happen if the general informed him of his deposition:

(...) if the eventuality of the ultimatum occurs, there will also be very serious consequences. Because we will not submit to any coup. To any arbitrary resolution. We do not intend to submit. Let them crush us! Destroy us! Let them slaughter us, in this palace! Brazil will be slaughtered with the imposition of a dictatorship against the will of its people. This radio will be silenced (...). But it will not be silenced without bullets.

As for Odílio Denys' statement that the choice was between communism and democracy, Brizola said: "We have nothing with the Russians. But we also have nothing with the Americans, who plunder and keep our homeland in poverty, illiteracy and misery". According to him, Denys would only be able to impose his will by causing chaos and dictatorship, and then "In the cities of the interior the guerrillas will arise for the defense of honor and dignity, against what a mad and senseless man is wanting to impose on the Brazilian family". He read Denys' orders about the movements of the army, air force and navy against his government. However, for him the bloody outcome could still be avoided, depending on what Machado Lopes and the "humble sergeant" would do.

The Military Brigade would also operate in the interior. For example, the Carazinho garrison would attack the army barracks in Passo Fundo to get armaments, requiring, however, an action to delay the neighboring army force in Cruz Alta, with civilian participation. The brigade had 13,000 men, and the 3rd Army, 40,000.

The army had in the capital the Guards Company, the 6th Army Police Company, a fraction (Note: Platoon or section. See the glossary in Pedrosa 2018.) of the 3rd Light Combat Car Battalion, brought from Santa Maria, the 18th Infantry Regiment, the 2nd Mechanized Reconnaissance Regiment, and an engineer battalion. An artillery group and the 19th Infantry Regiment were nearby in São Leopoldo. The 18th and 19th Regiments were two battalions. In addition, each cavalry division had sent a squadron to Porto Alegre because of the 7 September parade. Among them was a squadron of general Oromar Osório, (Note: One squadron was from the 4th Regiment, from Santiago. The other squadrons were from the 5th, from Quaraí (2nd AD) and the 9th, from São Gabriel (3rd AD).) that arrived in the capital in trains and trucks provided by the state government and would be a factor in its favor.

For Murici, with these forces it would be possible to crush Rio Grande do Sul's government in Porto Alegre, but this would risk a civil war. A big problem was the loss of cohesion in the 3rd Army, which was weakened by Brizola's psychological warfare, with soldiers, sergeants and even the lower ranks (lieutenants) falling under the influence of the Legality Chain. Furthermore, to fulfill the order from the Minister of War, Machado Lopes would need to confront, in addition to the Military Brigade and civilian volunteers, the 3rd DI and the 1st DC, which already had legalist commanders, demanding operations against Santa Maria and Santiago. Besides these, the 3rd Army had two more cavalry divisions (2nd and 3rd) and an infantry division (6th), and another infantry division (5th) in Paraná. The 1st DC was the strongest among the cavalry, although it did not reach the power of the 3rd or 6th DIs.

==== Definition of Machado Lopes ====
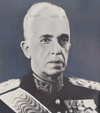
General Machado Lopes, commander of the 3rd Army

Brizola imagined that the III Army commander's audience would be to inform him that "already the power is taken up there" and advise him to resign. For his part, Machado Lopes hoped to "request from the State Governor the necessary measures so that he would moderate the acts of revolutionary exaltation that he had been practicing, including the return of Rádio Guaíba". However, the general endorsed the legalist cause, agreeing with the governor on the necessity of Goulart's inauguration and thus breaking with his superior, the Minister of War.

The decision was difficult for Machado Lopes, attached to the hierarchy, but made easier by the influence of his subordinates who were already legalists, the recognition that they would become enemies if Denys was obeyed, the insurrection that would be unleashed, the absurdity of the order to attack the Gaucho government, and the popular support that would be faced. According to some statements, the decision was not a personal one, but one made jointly with the General Staff and most of the officers. It occurred despite political-ideological differences with Brizola: the general was anti-communist and conservative-Christian, with a profile loyal to military discipline. The press avoided characterizing the alliance between the III Army and Brizola with the term "adhesion," and an edition of Última Hora with the word was withdrawn from circulation. There was tension and an effort to maintain a distance, which is visible in his memoirs, in which he insisted that "I never adhered to Governor Leonel Brizola" and that Legality had the support of the political parties, all social classes, and the clergy. (Note: More views are expressed in Lopes 1980, pp. 86–91: "We always had good protocol relations, without ever getting too close." "It was grotesque to see him, at the height of the crisis, with a portable machine gun in one hand and the Constitution in the other." "An admirer of Fidel Castro, he tried to imitate him in gestures and attitudes"; "he imagined repeating here what Fidel had done there, hoping to Cubanize Brazil". He also characterized Brizola as "the black angel of Mr. João Goulart," who exerted a radical and destabilizing influence on his government, but "the clergy, the people and especially the Armed Forces put a stop in 1964 to the chaotic situation in which the country found itself. He documents that, still in Jânio's government, Brizola had complained to the president about the Third Army's interference in gaúchos affairs, and also tells of an embarrassment that occurred during a dinner with the Austrian or Swiss ambassador. In his statement (1981, p. 385) Murici also mentions such frictions between Machado Lopes and the governor.)

Murici went to Rio de Janeiro to negotiate. When he returned, on the 29th, he tried to avoid a split within the army and reverse his commander's decision, without success. Since Murici would have to be arrested if he remained in Porto Alegre, he was released to go to Rio de Janeiro. "As long as I was out of the 3rd Army, I would be free, even to fight it." That same day Machado Lopes was called to Brasília, but announced that he would not obey the Minister of War, would remain in Rio Grande do Sul and would act on his own. The next day a decree named Osvaldo Cordeiro de Farias the new commander of the 3rd Army, but Machado Lopes made it clear that he would be arrested if he landed in Porto Alegre. Cordeiro de Farias resigned himself to setting up headquarters in Guanabara.

At noon on the 28th, Machado Lopes transmitted a message to the units subordinate to the III Army: "I communicate that having received an order from Mr. Minister, intermediate General Geisel, that would imply the outbreak of civil war, I declared that I would not comply and, from this moment on, as commander III Army, I would only comply with legal orders within the Constitution in force." Some officers' testimonies emphasize that their units' participation followed the hierarchy, with subordinates, even if of a different opinion, following their legalistic commanders. The legalist position was not unanimous within the Third Army. Besides Murici's rejection, there is mention of the refusal of a large part of the officers of the 19th Infantry Regiment to participate and, in Bagé, the 8th Cavalry Regiment and the 4th Horse Artillery Group were on opposite sides. In Florianopolis the Army garrison transferred its allegiance to the local Navy command, which was not legalistic. The officers of the 18th Infantry Regiment were still loyal to the military ministers, and the regiment only participated after the insubordination of the legalist sergeants. It was a large and relevant unit, based in Porto Alegre.

=== Society ===
The Legality Campaign was embraced by broad sectors of the gaucho society: the state government, Military Brigade, III Army, political figures, unionists, workers and students. The common cause united the state government with the intransigent opposition from the Libertarian Party and the sports rivals Grêmio and Internacional. Catholics and Umbandistas participated on the same side. Transport workers, seamen, railroad workers, construction workers, metalworkers, high school students, bank workers and nurses formed the popular and workers' battalions.

Those who agreed or were neutral to the military ministers' coup were relatively silent, but such positions also had their sectors in society. Throughout the early 1960s there were forces opposed to Goulart in the clergy, officials, the Federation of Industries (FIERGS), the Federation of Commercial Associations (FEDERASUL) and the Federation of Agriculture (FARSUL). The federations were part of a political culture of associativism as an instrument to defend the interests of these classes. This opposition had as its discourse the threat represented by the exogenous force of atheistic communism to the social and political order and the endogenous democratic and Christian ideology. Among the Gaucho politicians opposed to legality was Paulo Brossard.

Última Hora from Porto Alegre, a Getulista newspaper and Goulart supporter, still did not always take a favorable line to Brizola, but "the differences were put totally aside and Brizola ended up being heroicized and canonized (...) as the leader of the movement". The Globo Magazine also gave enthusiastic support. The conservative Correio do Povo sought distance from Brizola, but was not against the constitutional solution.

==== Working class ====
While much is said about the leadership role assumed by the governor of Rio Grande do Sul, Leonel Brizola, little emphasis is given to the role of the popular classes in the struggle for legality. In parallel with Brizola's charismatic figure, the working classes and unions played a crucial role, both during the campaign and for the outcome it had.

On the same day that Brizola begins to hear rumors of a coup, the Communist Party calls a meeting to decide how to act in the face of the situation that presented itself. Under the leadership of the Porto Alegre Trade Union Command a march begins on the afternoon of August 25, with some 5,000 demonstrators, among workers and students, who gather at the Largo da Prefeitura of Porto Alegre and walk to the Piratini Palace. The demonstrators wanted to ensure Goulart's inauguration, and thus formed an alliance between the working class and students.

The heart of the workers' legalist resistance were the Resistance Committees. These committees made possible "the recruitment of volunteers to be used in any eventuality [...] The committee, in addition, held marches; organized rallies and lectures; made posters alluding to the movement and had a service of collecting funds for the resistance". Just as Brizola started the Legality network, with the intention of spreading the news about the resistance, the Resistance Committees also used the media as allies; the newspaper "Resistance" circulated among the committees with the most recent news.

The workers were also ready to join a general strike, just waiting for the signal from the Communist Party and the trade unions, but for strategic reasons the strike did not take place. However, it was decided to create the Unified Trade Union Command, with José César de Mesquita, a trade unionist for the Metalworkers of Porto Alegre, as president. The mobilization for democratic resistance within the labor movement was very strong, making clear the commitment of the working class in the speech of the communist councilman from the Republican Party, Marino dos Santos: "From here on this rostrum making my pronouncement I call on all the workers to organize themselves, to go to their factories to explain to their colleagues that what is being struck is the right to live decently in Brazil; that what is being struck is the right of Brazilians to dream of a better future; that what is being struck is the right of a free and sovereign Nation that has its head held high in the concert of nations. It is enough that the proletariat is organized, that it closes and crosses its arms not giving these fascists that from the cassock to the quepi, from the bread they eat to the roof that shelters them, is created by the work of the Brazilian people, is created by the work and the sweat of the farmers, to whom they deny the right of self-determination. So let them stop working, let them not give a grain of wheat, an hour of work, in a regime that is not one of freedom and citizen's rights enjoy the guarantees of the Constitution."

The workers were ready for the fight, and it was they who widened the lines in the streets, clamoring for the Constitution to be respected. However, the figure that stood out was Leonel Brizola, who, realizing the growth of the workers in the streets, tried to control the direction of the resistance. The then governor of Rio Grande do Sul tried to build himself a figure of a "hero", of a "providential man", moving "so that he would not have to share this condition with many other leaderships, especially the workers' leaderships that aimed to disassociate the union movement from any kind of paternalism".

== Legality in Paraná ==
According to sources, governor Ney Braga or participated in the movement, issuing a manifesto together with Mauro Borges, or had an ambiguous position, unofficially being against Goulart's inauguration and preferring Jânio's return, which generated criticism. But Legality had great popular support in the state. Aligned with it were the Legislative Assembly, the state PTB and PSD (with UDN having an ambiguous position), the 5th Military Region under General Benjamin Rodrigues Galhardo (subordinated to the 3rd Army) and the press. Students, unionists, journalists and politicians held rallies and demonstrations. The mayor of Curitiba, General Iberê de Mattos, integrated Rádio Guairacá into the Legality Chain and opened up volunteer participation in the armed struggle. The Democratic Gathering Committee had 1,200 registrants.

== Legality in Goiás ==
Mauro Borges, governor of Goiás

Mauro Borges, governor of Goiás, was, next to Brizola, the most legalistic governor. He declared: "I am not and never have been a communist", but, "[...] if the succession does not occur within the respect for the Constitution, Goiás will be ready to fight in defense of the national order". With a conciliatory ideological profile, opposed to radical trends, he characterized his efforts as contrary to the establishment of a "retrograde military dictatorship". He issued his manifesto for legality on the 28th. Backed by his father, also a politician, Pedro Ludovico Teixeira, by the PSD and by the Legislative Assembly, he centralized the Goiania legalist cause in the Esmeraldas Palace, seat of his government. The army censored Brasil Central, the state broadcaster committed to the cause, and all communications in the state, but the broadcaster was then transferred to the governor's palace, from where it also operated an information service.

A reserve officer, Mauro Borges established a Military Staff and led the planning to, if necessary, defend his state, taking into account logistics and employing the Goiás State Military Police and volunteers. The Esmeraldas Palace was equipped with a generator. About five thousand volunteers were recruited in Goiânia to receive military training, forming the "Tiradentes Battalion". The armaments available in the stores were requisitioned and put under the custody of the Anhanguera Battalion of the Military Police. In coordination with Rio Grande do Sul, Varig prepared to airlift armaments and ammunition from Porto Alegre to Goiânia. Engineering missions were prepared to detonate the bridges at Itumbiara and Cristalina, over which, respectively, the roads to São Paulo and Brasília crossed. Faced with the possibility of the closure of Congress, Goiânia was offered as a provisional headquarters, in the so-called "Operation Carrapato". A shipment of weapons was sent to the capital via side roads, as the main ones were under army control. A runway was improvised and protected by guards for a possible landing of Goulart, for which the state plane was made available.

The army took Goiás seriously. The Federal District is surrounded by its territory and depended on the energy from the Cachoeira Dourada power plant. On the 30th, informed by congresswoman Ivete Vargas that a grouping of 40 mm anti-aircraft cannons would pass through Goiânia, the governor threatened to ambush the force on the road; no such move occurred. With the fear of a paratroop attack, the Esmeraldas Palace and surrounding buildings received barricades, cannons and machine guns, with police and volunteers guarding points in the city. At 6am on the 31st, the Army occupied Anápolis airport with 200 soldiers from the 6th Hunters Battalion (6th HB), who then quartered at the Army Subsistence Depot; the Goias government declared that Anápolis was not occupied. The federal garrison in the state was 849 well-armed men, against 300 of the Goias Military Police. The Army had two infantry battalions in Goiás, the 6th HB in Ipameri and the 10th HB in Goiânia, while the Presidential Guard Battalion was in Brasilia.

== Military division ==
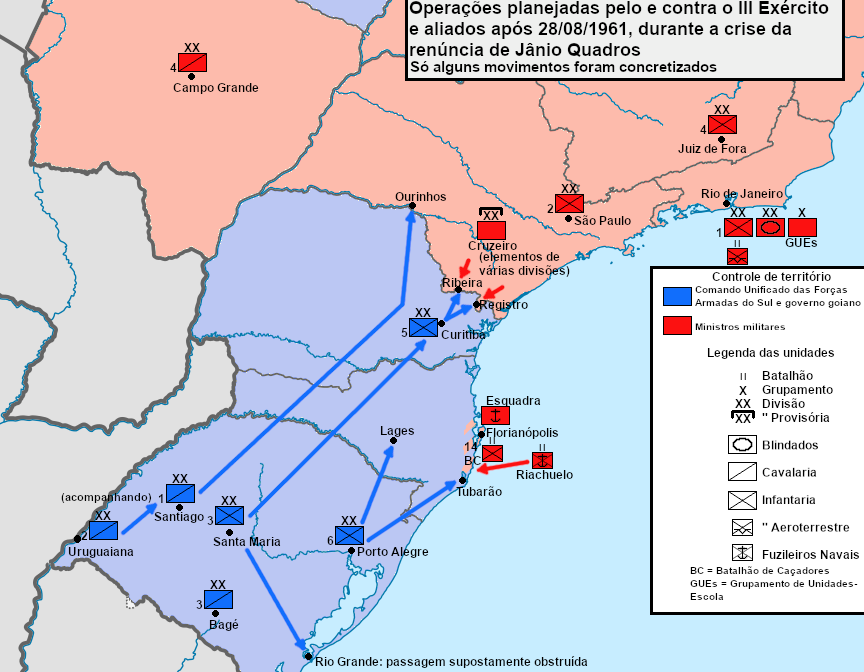
Military situation and operations planned by the legalists and their opponents

The rupture between the Third Army and the War Ministry accentuated the existing political polarization among the military, leaving them deeply divided. Even some coup plotters in 1964 were in favor of Goulart's inauguration in 1961, such as Olímpio Mourão Filho and Castelo Branco. A distinction was made between the legalists, the defenders of the intervention made by the ministers, and those who "considered the seizure of power premature" due to the resistance it would have from public opinion and the legalists. In some statements from officers outside the III Army and of legalistic opinion, there is the nuance that their opinions were in spite of, not because of Brizola.

The legalists triumphed with the inauguration in September, but only partially, given the installation of parliamentarianism. According to Brazilianist Thomas Skidmore, the military ministers did not have a sufficient base of support to overcome the veto, because the crisis was too sudden, not allowing time for the formation of an opinion within the ranks. It would have been possible to impose an unpopular resolution if the Armed Forces had been united. For military historian Hernani D'Aguiar, the junta made a strategic error in allowing the crisis to continue, and could have imposed its will with an immediate military coup, taking over the government. Golbery do Couto e Silva saw in the lack of popular support the cause of the military ministers' failure.

Machado Lopes only had the "Unified Command of the Armed Forces of the South": the 3rd Army, a minority of the Air Force (5th Air Zone), the Military Brigade and the Public Forces. The BM was removed from "restless Mr. Leonel Brizola" by having its commander, Colonel Diomário Morgen, integrated into the General Staff. The hypothesis of the campaign was to invade São Paulo by three axes and advance towards Rio de Janeiro. The expected advantages were the enemy's defection and popular support; Machado Lopes hoped that São Paulo public opinion would "relive 1932". The III Army was the largest, but the I Army, in Guanabara, was also strong and included the Armored Division and the paratroopers.

For their part, the "northern" forces were preparing to invade and crush the "southern rebels," having "larger numbers, more modern equipment, absolute dominance in armour, all the war power of the Navy and Air Force, the airship, napalm bombs, etc." Meanwhile, its morale was wavering, threatening to collapse the force. Its military and their families were under the influence of the Legality Chain. The southern forces, on the other hand, were cohesive and strongly motivated.

Low-ranking legalist military personnel, especially sergeants, were important, in several cases acting in large numbers and even breaking the military hierarchy to prevent the actions of officers opposed to Goulart's inauguration. In Rio Grande do Sul they were important in the accession of the 18th Infantry Regiment and in the neutralization of the Canoas Air Base, and in the rest of the country they appeared in the case of Operation Mosquito.

=== Land Routes ===
Numbers of troops, 1961
Commander	Efetive
I Army	47.496
II Army	18.962
III Army	47.353
IV Army	16.866
C.M. Amazon	4.188
C.M. Brasília	2.790

By March 30, the III Army divisions were already marching north. According to the following day's orders, the 1st Division, passing through Ponta Grossa, would invade São Paulo through Ourinhos and Sorocaba, with the 2nd Division following behind. The 5th DI would cross the border in Ribeira, advancing on the BR-373 to Sorocaba, and through Registro, advancing on the BR-116. The 6th DI concentrated in Vacaria and moved to Santa Catarina. The 3rd DC and 3rd DI were able to move north, with the latter receiving Curitiba as its first destination. The 3rd DI also sent a detachment to the port of Rio Grande; the concern was not only with the land campaign but also with the defense of the coast. Porto Alegre received anti-aircraft forces.

The 1st and 2nd DC were moved by rail, but each was given the means to motor a regiment. The road (2nd and 3rd) and rail (1st and 2nd) battalions were to be converted into combat engineering battalions, capable of acting with two companies of marines, and in charge of some stretches of highway and coastline. Public order fell to the Military Brigade. Liquid fuel would last for 30 days. The southern states were self-sufficient in food and could still rely on trade with Uruguay and Argentina. The state government issued Treasury Bills, guaranteeing the circulation of money.

The ground force charged with invading the south of the country and crushing the legalists was the "Cruzeiro Division", commanded by General José Theophilo de Arruda. Eight railroad convoys departed from Guanabara. A São Paulo task force was ordered to head south, composed of the 4th Infantry Regiment, the 2nd Group of 90 mm Anti-aircraft Cannons, the 2nd Group of 40 mm Anti-aircraft Cannons, and the 2nd Mechanized Reconnaissance Squadron. However, the commander of the 40 mm cannons, Colonel Celso Freire de Alencar Araripe, announced that he would not leave Barueri. Likewise, the 90 mm cannons remained in Quitaúna.

Also participating would be the 2nd 105mm Gun Regiment from Itu, which, after a visit by the commander of the São Paulo component (GT/4), General Ulhoa Cintra, had all its senior officers arrested, including the commander, Colonel Oswaldo de Mello Loureiro, after the officers showed solidarity with a major who questioned the campaign and the possibility of it being fratricidal in nature. (Note: According to an account by an officer of the regiment, Geraldo Luiz Nery da Silva: "Thus, the General, in concluding, stated that the troops that would move south, like those under his command, were much stronger and much better supported than the opponents, which would lead us to enter Porto Alegre triumphant, and that he "would not admit, under any circumstances, demonstrations of lukewarmness". After these last words, he asked if anyone had anything to say. And, at that very moment, Major Nelson Lucas, S/3 of the Group, said that he wasn't worried about whether the GT/4 was strong or not; he was, instead, worried about his conscience when participating in a fratricidal fight. That he would go armed with a cudgel against the South without any problem if his conscience told him to and not because he felt strong. That although he was not lukewarm, he felt weak because he had no way to explain to his children the reason for his act of going against those who happened to be serving in the III Army.") Nevertheless, on September 5, under the command of the Divisionary Artillery of Jundiaí, the regiment sent its first group to Juquiá, on the BR-116 highway, forming a grouping with the 2nd 155mm Howitzer Group, also from Jundiaí. Several other cases of insubordination occurred. In Santos, Col. Creso Coutinho, commander of the 2nd Hunters Battalion, refused to go to Registro. In Minas Gerais, the commander of the 11th Infantry Regiment, Colonel Luna Pedrosa, did not want to move his unit.

On the São Paulo-Paraná border, there was contact between the opposing forces in the Ribeira region and on the BR-116 highway. This was blocked by the 5th Military Region with the "Destacamento Iguaçú", formed from the CPOR in Curitiba and including an artillery battery. The Detachment did some engineering work, improvising explosives on the road; it requested anti-tank mines from the 5th Combat Engineering Battalion in Porto União, but he did not want to deliver them. According to an officer, the troops of the Detachment did not want to fight, and the opponent was much stronger. On the other side, the 4th Infantry Regiment was nearby. According to Machado Lopes, General Públio Ribeiro, commander of the vanguard of Ulhoa Cintra's São Paulo troops, informed him that "if he had to go into action, it would not be against the 3rd Army," with similar demonstrations from other garrisons.

Composition of the Cruzeiro Division
Component	Efetive	
Component	Officers	Low rank
Total	546	9.815
HQ	30	111
Alpha Detachment	252	4.066
Beta Detachment	111	2.334
Gama Detachment	92	2.102
Delta Detachment (Note: "Armored detachment," as per Motta 2003, p. 124, tomo 1.)	61	1.202

=== Air bases ===
Gloster Meteor from FAB

The Canoas Air Base, in Rio Grande do Sul, had 16 Gloster Meteor (F-8) fighters from the 1st Squadron of the 14th Aviation Group, 12 of them operational and armed with bombs. According to aviator Oswaldo França Júnior, who served at the base, on the 27th, the squadron commander, Major Cassiano Pereira, discussed among the officers the bombing of the Piratini Palace and the radio towers, to be carried out at dawn the next day, later changed to 2:30 pm. The base sergeants and the civilians monitoring telegraph traffic also concluded that there would be bombing. The pilot officers, all from outside Rio Grande do Sul, did not contest the order, but in the early morning of the 28th the sergeants from Rio Grande do Sul sabotaged the operation, deflating the tires, disarming the planes and informing Brizola and Machado Lopes. Extreme tension arose between Lieutenant-Colonel Honório Pereira Magalhães, the base commander, and the legalist sergeants, over whom he lost control.

Brigadier Passos, the lieutenant-colonel's superior, was against the operation and requested its postponement, but according to Flávio Tavares, he still passed on the order to his subordinates, unable to define himself. In the afternoon, the base commander declared that the new order was only to move the planes to Cumbica, in São Paulo, and that both he and the brigadier were against the intimidating overflight of the Piratini Palace. The commanders didn't believe it. The rebellion was only defused on the morning of the 29th, when, at Brigadier Passos' request, the III Army occupied the base and for a few hours arrested the sergeants. The new commander of the base was Major Mário de Oliveira, and of the 5th Air Zone, Lieutenant Colonel Alfeu de Alcântara Monteiro, with his predecessors going to Rio de Janeiro. According to Machado Lopes, Brigadier Passos himself, who was not a legalist, when he learned of the change in the III Army's side, communicated that he was imprisoned at home. However, he received a DC-3 so he could leave Rio Grande do Sul with his family; "I have a clear conscience that I have not constrained anyone's freedom, and those who supported me did so with absolute spontaneity."

The new Air Zone commander joined Machado Lopes. Meanwhile, the planes and non-legalist officers left the base, unarmed, heading to São Paulo, where the FAB concentrated its firepower for the conflict with Machado Lopes. One of the Air Force operations was to fly over the south and drop leaflets urging the troops to disobey Machado Lopes' authority. By accident the leaflets were dropped in Rivera, Uruguay. The legalist Air Force commander in Belém, Colonel Fausto Gerp, was arrested.

Ernesto Geisel proposed conquering Curitiba's Afonso Pena Airport with a parachute battalion and then landing the Infantry Regiment-School there, well armed and the only complete infantry regiment in the country, and the small garrison of the capital of Paraná joined him. Cordeiro de Farias would then take command in Curitiba. However, Odílio Denys did not want to use the paratroopers because he considered them his reserve, an assessment rejected by Geisel, since the function of the reserve would be precisely "to obtain a decision at a critical point."

=== Litoral ===
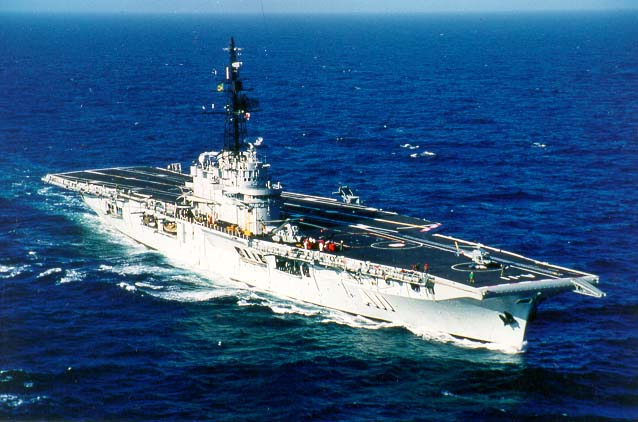
NAeL Minas Gerais (A-11)

When Jânio Quadros resigned, the escort destroyer Baependi was docked at the Port of Porto Alegre to receive a presidential visit to the city, which did not materialize. Later, Machado Lopes justified the use of tanks in the streets of the capital as having been only to defend against the ship, and not to attack the Piratini Palace. The ship left the city on the 31st because of the crisis. The commander of the Bracuí, docked in Recife, disobeyed orders from the Third Naval District, which was against Goulart's inauguration. On the Ajuricaba, which was setting sail for the port of Rio Grande, the sailors, led by a legalist sub-officer, arrested the officers and took control of the ship.

The commander of the Port Authority of Rio Grande do Sul, Commander Humberto J. Pittipaldi, was in a situation equivalent to that of Brigadier Passos and was given freedom to leave Porto Alegre.

In Florianópolis, Rear-Admiral Luís Clovis da Silveira, commander of the 5th Naval District, remained loyal to the military ministers. He censored the news, got the adhesion of Lieutenant Colonel Silvio Pinto da Luz, commander of the 700 men of the 14th Hunters Battalion, and took control of the capital of Santa Catarina, having more authority than the governor himself. On September 2, he was reinforced by the 2nd Company of the 2nd Infantry Regiment, coming from Rio de Janeiro, composed of recruits with less than a month of service.

The Navy reinforced Santa Catarina with operations "Anel" and "Abelha". The first consisted of eight ships: the aircraft carrier Minas Gerais, escort boats, destroyers and a cruiser. On September 3 they were sighted two kilometers from Praia dos Ingleses, north of Santa Catarina Island, by a reconnaissance flight of Legalidade. The presence of P-16 aircraft is noted in one source, while another clarifies that the ship sailed without aviation on board. The other operation was the embarkation of Marines from the artillery and Riachuelo Battalion, even employing two requisitioned merchant ships, but the crisis was resolved before the Marines needed to disembark on the coast of Santa Catarina. (Note: The Navy sources attest that there was no landing, but journalist Flávio Tavares, in "1961: O Golṕe Derrotado", mentions a landing in Laguna and Imbituba.) On September 1, Machado Lopes denied to the press that there was a Navy landing in Santa Catarina, stating that it was only a routine manpower replacement.

The Folha da Tarde reported on September 4 that the III Army controlled the garrisons in the interior and the northern coast of Santa Catarina (Itajaí and São Francisco do Sul), while the Navy dominated the capital and the southern coast (Laguna and Imbituba). Another source mentions, however, a risk of confrontation between the III Army and a part of the 23rd Infantry Regiment in position on the Cabeçudas bridge near Laguna. Machado Lopes moved in the direction of Santa Catarina task forces from the 6th DI, one through the interior and the other along the coast.

From the interior of the country, the 19th Infantry Regiment, accompanied by the 1st Group of the 6th 105mm Guns Regiment, were entrenched in the region of Lages. From the coast (Torres to Tubarão), the 1st Battalion of the 18th Infantry Regiment, a BM battalion, a mechanized reconnaissance platoon, and a company of engineers followed. The BM participation was the Operations Battalion, a mixed force of several units, with 637 men under Major Heraclides Tarragô. He deployed to Torres, near the Santa Catarina border, entrenching himself to defend the coast.

Against a possible amphibious invasion, a Mixed Detachment under General Santa Rosa defended the coast. Furthermore, the Southerners' "Operation Turtle" simulated the obstruction of the bar at Rio Grande with a false sinking of loaded flat-bottomed boat, giving the Navy to understand that it would be impossible to enter the Lagoa dos Patos. A real obstruction would be costly to reverse. The bar at Rio Grande was also defended by the 1st Battalion of the 9th Infantry Regiment and the 7th Coast Artillery Group.

== Parliamentary solution ==
September 8th: inauguration of Tancredo Neves as Prime Minister, in the presence of President João Goulart

At first Goulart thought of resigning so that new elections could be held, but upon learning of the military ministers' coup, he judged that resignation would be his "self-emasculation" and that "The accusations they make against me prevent me from resigning." From Singapore, he arrived on the 28th in Paris, passing through Zürich. In Europe he spoke to the international press and maintained telephone contact – tapped by the military ministers' government – with Brazil. San Tiago Dantas suggested he resign. Goulart refused, but authorized Congress to declare his impeachment if this was the only way to avoid bloodshed. His return to the country was delayed to allow time for political negotiations. On August 29 he went to New York. From there, with stopovers in Miami, Panama City and Lima, he arrived on the 31st in Buenos Aires. Argentine president Arturo Frondizi was the victim of several coups and feared the repercussions of Goulart's presence, isolating him with soldiers from contact with journalists and politicians. On the same day he went to Montevideo, where he was even received by the Uruguayan Foreign Minister.

Meanwhile, Congress found the conciliatory solution of parliamentarianism, which would install Goulart with reduced powers. Before the approval, which took place in the early hours of September 2, the pessedist Tancredo Neves went to Montevideo and at great cost convinced Goulart to accept the constitutional change. Tancredo argued that the powers were not so reduced and entering Brasilia with full powers was possible, but only at the head of an army on operations. Jango replied, "If I have to shed Brazilian blood, I will resign the presidency right now." But he had several other possible reasons for accepting: the intention to regain his full powers, which he did in fact accomplish in 1963, and the assessment that if he did in fact attempt an invasion into Brasilia, the political reward would be in Brizola's hands and not his.

The consent of the military ministers was still needed, and before the vote on the amendment they were pressured by governors and generals to accept the decision of Congress, whatever it might be. Marshal Denys, realizing the failure of the coup and civil and military disobedience, accepted. Admiral Heck and Brigadier Moss did not like it, but they could do nothing without the Army. The Brazilian military is historically opposed to parliamentarianism, but accepting the system was for the junta the "honorable way out" of the crisis. Public opinion, on the other hand, according to the Ibope poll in Guanabara, preferred Goulart's inauguration under presidentialism. Even so, in Rio de Janeiro there was celebration at the resolution of the crisis. Carlos Lacerda, on the other hand, considered both parliamentarianism and the inauguration bad.

The biggest opposition came from Brizola, who saw no legitimacy in approving parliamentarianism, since "The Brazilian Congress is under military coercion. Brazil is practically in a state of siege. (...) In Rio de Janeiro, there are thousands of prisoners. The press is censored, the radio is censored, with countless stations suspended. (...) Congress is a prisoner of military power, coerced by the military ministers". He preferred an inauguration with full powers guaranteed by an offensive of the III Army, Military Brigade and volunteer corps out of the south of the country. The left assessed the institution of parliamentarism as a "white coup". In Rio Grande do Sul there was disappointment among militants of the Legality Campaign.

Goulart went to Porto Alegre on September 1, but did not give a speech to the public. On the 4th, Ranieri Mazzilli guaranteed Congress safe disembarkation in Brasilia for the following day. However, there was a new obstacle to the inauguration: at night, deputies and senators who were to travel from Brasília to Porto Alegre to pick up Goulart were prevented from boarding. The Minister of Aeronautics had informed interim president Mazzilli that nonconformist elements in the FAB intended to shoot down the presidential plane on the route between Porto Alegre and Brasilia, in "Operation Mosquito" (pt). Early the next day, the military ministers presented themselves to Mazzilli, with Brigadier Grün Moss presenting his resignation, which was refused.

The three said they were unable to prevent the operation. When Mazzilli insisted with questions, such as why they didn't threaten to shoot down the fighter that took off for this purpose, they answered that the departure time of the presidential plane would be known by radio in all the air bases and the takeoff could be from any of them. Ernesto Geisel, present at the conversation, suggested interdicting the air base with the Army. The military ministers eventually gave in and the landing safely took place in Brasilia, with the air base occupied by soldiers. The dismantling of Operation Mosquito was thus done at the highest levels. According to other sources, its neutralization also occurred by the sergeants of the air base in Brasilia, who sabotaged the four F-8s transferred from the Santa Cruz Air Base in Rio de Janeiro for this purpose.

João Goulart took office as President of the Republic on September 7. The President of the Council of Ministers, i.e. Prime Minister, was initially Tancredo Neves, and the cabinet, conciliatory, united the PTB, PSD and UDN.

== International reaction ==
Jânio Quadros' resignation was a surprise abroad. The French newspaper Le Monde speculated on Goulart's resignation followed by elections, while the British Daily Mail imagined a return of Jânio to power. The Soviet agency TASS accused the American Central Intelligence Agency (CIA) of being behind the resignation, and the Eastern Bloc showed solidarity with the resigning president.

It would be customary for the US government to demand compliance with the constitutional succession in Brazil, but breaking with this tradition, there was silence, without condemnation of the civil-military veto of the vice-president's inauguration to the vacant presidency. As U.S. attaché Niles Bond argued, "While a statement supporting constitutional process may seem like a mere reiteration of the traditional U.S. position, in the present situation Brazil it would constitute clear endorsement of the Goulart cause, which would be strongly resented by those of our friends who support military efforts to exclude Goulart from the Presidency because of his known communist sympathies."

However, according to Moniz Bandeira, based on testimony by Admiral Heck, there were two American policies. On one side, the Pentagon and the CIA supported the coup. On the other, the State Department and John F. Kennedy's White House were against it, and the military ministers received a report threatening to cut off financial aid to Brazil if the succession was not respected, which influenced their acceptance of Goulart's investiture. At the time, the policy adopted at the Punta del Este conference was not to support countries with dictatorships, non-functional legislative power or absence of periodic elections. A rule created against Cuba, but that could be applied to Brazil.

== Timeline ==
- July 28, Friday: Vice President João Goulart leaves on a diplomatic mission.
- August 15, Tuesday: Mission arrives in Beijing.
- August 18, Friday: Carlos Lacerda, governor of Guanabara, goes to Brasilia to meet President Jânio Quadros.
- August 19, Saturday: Lacerda returns to Rio de Janeiro. Jânio awards a medal to Che Guevara.
- August 22, Tuesday: In São Paulo, Lacerda accuses Jânio of wanting a coup.
- August 24, Thursday: Lacerda repeats the accusations, with great impact.
- August 25, Friday: Jânio resigns. Ranieri Mazzili, president of the Chamber of Deputies, arrives at the Planalto Palace.
- August 27, Sunday: Marshal Lott is arrested. Federal Government closes radio stations in Porto Alegre. Leonel Brizola, governor of Rio Grande do Sul, requisitions Rádio Guaíba.
- August 28, Monday: Jânio Quadros leaves the country. Congress is formally notified of the military veto of João Goulart's inauguration. General Machado Lopes, commander of the Third Army, allies himself with Brizola.
- September 1, Friday: Goulart arrives in Porto Alegre.
- September 2, Saturday: Constitutional amendment to the parliamentary system is approved.
- September 5, Tuesday: After overcoming the difficulties of Operation Mosquito, Goulart arrives in Brasilia.
- September 7, Thursday: Presidential inauguration.

== Results ==
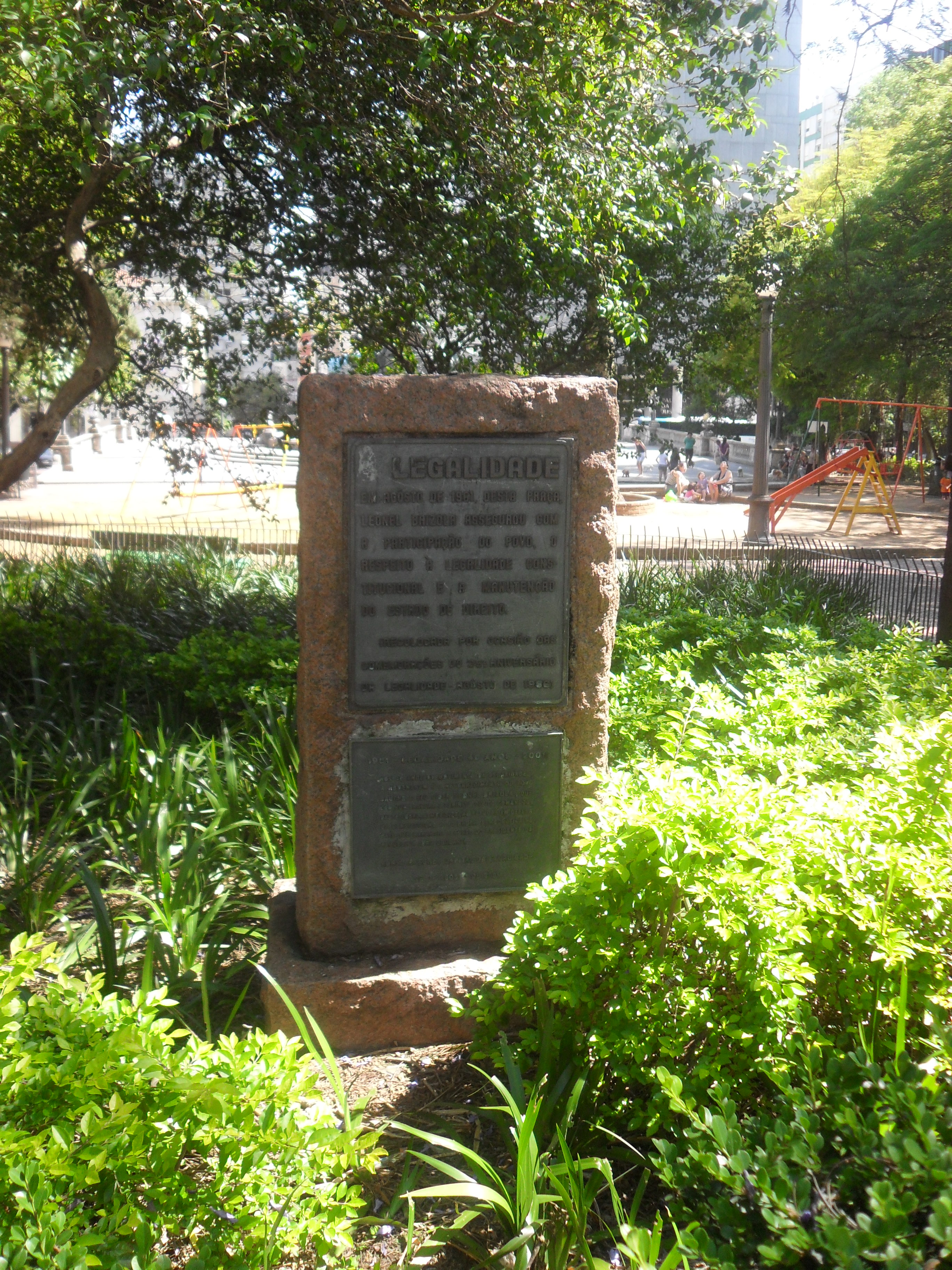
Monument to the Cadeia da Legalidade in Porto Alegre

Constitutional Amendment No. 4, which established parliamentarianism, provided for a plebiscite in April 1965 to choose whether to remain with the new system of government or return to presidentialism. But Goulart managed to maneuver politically to anticipate the vote, and, with great support from the electorate, regained his full presidential powers in January 1963. "Used as a simple expedient to solve a crisis, parliamentarianism could not last." and because of this hasty solution character it was remembered in political history as a "patch".

Under his government from 1961 to 1964, the political and economic crises deepened, culminating on March 31, 1964, with the rebellion of General Mourão Filho's 4th Military Region. The resulting military coup overthrew the Goulart government, ended the Populist Republic (1946–1964) and initiated Brazil's military dictatorship (1964–1985). "The attempted coup in 1961 made it evident that a sure-fire coup was gaining body, it just remained to be seen who would do it." The veto by the military ministers in 1961 is called a "dress rehearsal" for 1964. However, historian Jorge Ferreira argues against a teleological interpretation of the crises of the Populist Republic in 1954, 1955 and 1961, that they were predecessors of an inevitable coup that materialized in 1964; according to him, each moment had its particularities and was not inevitable. In the first three cases right-wing civil and military forces interfered in the legal succession of power dominated by the PSD and PTB, failing for lack of support. In 1964 there was sufficient support in society and the Armed Forces for the interference to succeed, with external support from the United States as well.

After the crisis, Brizola gained prestige in the country and radicalized his political positions. In 1962, he was elected federal deputy for Guanabara. The political participation of the Armed Forces low rank soldiers, who had their first, still modest, appearances to the general public in the Legality Campaign, became a movement in defense of the interests of the "class" and of nationalist and reformist proposals, such as the base reforms proposed by the president. Disciplinary problems arose and two rebellions: the 1963 Revolt of the sergeants in Brasília and the 1964 Revolt of the sailors in Guanabara. The soldiers' movements riled the officers against the president, and the Navy mutiny occurred a few days before the coup broke out.

The anti-communist discourse remained, and "as Brizola mentioned," "all social movements and politicians that defended social reforms, workers' rights or the landless were accused of being communists, agitators, enemies of order". The "party elements linked to the conservative-oligarchic bloc and favorable to foreign capital participation," many of whom supported the inauguration, had better political articulation through the Institute of Social Research and Studies (Ipes), allowing them to mount opposition to Goulart. Meanwhile, in 1961, conspiratorial articulations against the new president were emerging, with meetings of the military under Admiral Heck in November, in Rio de Janeiro, and of civilians with Generals Dalísio Menna Barreto and Agostinho Cortes in São Paulo.

During the coup, the opposition to Goulart set up its own radio station, the "Chain of Freedom", with radio stations in Minas Gerais and São Paulo, in order to copy Brizola's successful strategy in 1961. In Porto Alegre, the legalist general Ladário Pereira Teles took over the III Army on April 1 and Brizola, present in Porto Alegre, tried a second Legality Campaign, trying to maintain the president's power in Rio Grande do Sul, to later recover it in the country. He even used the requested broadcasting stations for a new Chain of Legality, but was unsuccessful in repeating the formula of three years earlier.

During the course of the March 31, 1964, Abelardo Jurema occupied Rádio Nacional with the goal of reissuing Legalidade, but was censored by the FAB. On the night of the same day, General Amaury Kruel, commander of the 2nd Army, offered the president his support if he were to break with the left, but Goulart refused. Comparing such a break with parliamentarianism, he thought his power would be even less, and did not want to become a figurative president. To Tancredo Neves explained that it would be possible to remain in power with the realignment of his support base, because the target was not him, but the reforms. On April 2, in Porto Alegre, still with a minority of forces, he declared that "I do not wish bloodshed in defense of my mandate," leaving the city and, in a few days, going into exile.

== See also ==
- List of coups and coup attempts by country#Brazil
- Operation Farroupilha
