= José Luiz de Magalhães Lins =

Brazilian banker (1929–2023)

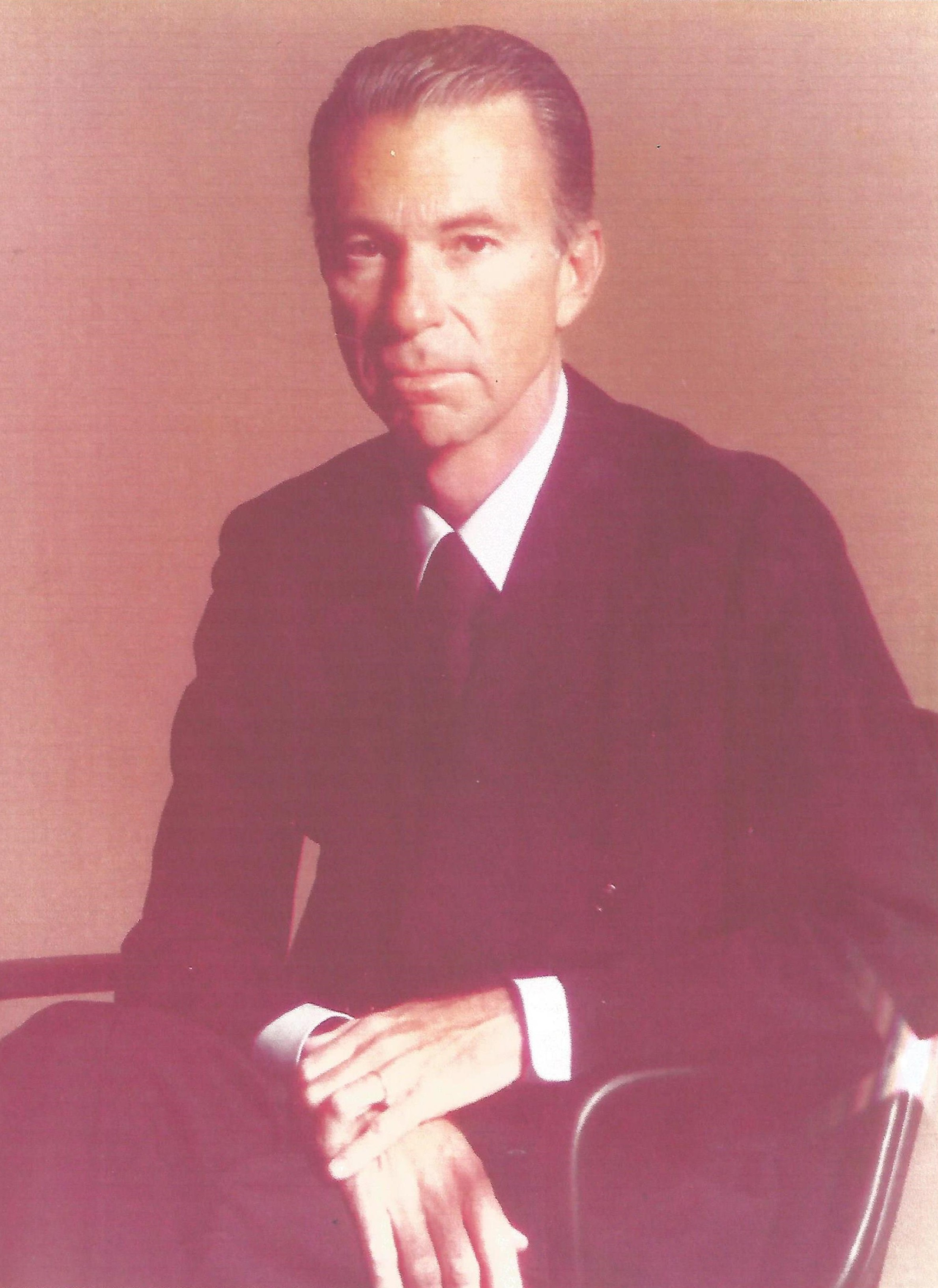
- Born: 12 April 1929; Arcos, Minas Gerais, Brazil
- Died: 3 February 2023 (aged 93); Rio de Janeiro, Brazil
- Spouse: Maria do Carmo Nabuco de Magalhães Lins
- Children: Ana Cecília, Maria Cristiana, José Antonio, José Luiz Filho (1969-2012) e João Paulo
- Parents: Edmundo Lins Júnior (father); Alice de Magalhães Lins (mother)

José Luiz de Magalhães Lins (12 April 1929 – 3 February 2023) was a Brazilian banker. Ahead of Banco Nacional de Minas Gerais, he became famous in the 1960s as the main patron of the Cinema Novo film movement and as one of the most influential sponsors of cultural production at the time.

Son of the railroad worker Edmundo Lins Júnior and housewife Alice de Magalhães Lins, he started working at the age of 14 as a seller of savings bonds. At 19, he was hired as a clerk at the newly founded Banco Nacional de Minas Gerais. At the age of 30, he became executive officer of the institution, accumulating the functions of president of Banco Sotto-Mayor and Banco Comercial de Minas Gerais.

While his uncle José de Magalhães Pinto was dedicated to his political career, Lins led the expansion of Banco Nacional de Minas Gerais with others and designed the institution in the cultural segment and also in the communication sector. Friend of Roberto Marinho (Rede Globo) and Nascimento Britto (Jornal do Brasil), advisor to some of the most influential political and economic leaders in the country, José Luiz was defined by lawyer Jorge Serpa as the absent most present in the country. Always reserved, averse to cameras and microphones, he fits - according to journalist Mário Sérgio Conti - in a very Rio de Janeiro category: that of “Eminências Discretas-Mas-Nem-Tanto”.

For journalist Otto Lara Resende - a client who became friends with him - Lins was the right friend of the uncertain promissory notes. Personalities like Garrincha and Grande Otelo, as well as filmmakers like Cacá Diegues and Glauber Rocha, counted on their financial support - and many loans, as defined by the journalist Ruy Castro - at critical moments. For the chronicler and playwright Nelson Rodrigues - who José Luiz always supported -, the banker occupied “a place that gives the person the vision of War and Peace, of Balzac and Proust”. According to lawyer Miguel Lins, in an emblematic phrase, “Every Lins has a craze. José Luiz has them all". For Otávio Frias Filho, owner of Folha de São Paulo newspaper, José Luiz de Magalhães Lins was the mythical and mysterious banker that his father admired, which led him to catch a plane and travel to Rio to meet José Luiz. For Roberto Marinho - who did not like to fight - “José Luiz is the only man for whom I would fight, even if he was not right”.

Roberto Marinho, counted on his help at a fundamental moment for TV Globo. When betting on television, he made a deal with the American group Time-Life and, to pay it, after giving up on a joint venture, he needed a new loan. He had agreed two months before with a bank that gave up at the last minute and needed the funds the next day in order not to lose shares of TV and assets such as his residence at Cosme Velho. The day before, Marinho sought out José Luiz, desperate, accompanied by Joseph Wallach and Walter Clark. If he did not raise the amount, he would lose the TV and had a few hours to perform the operation. But the banker obtained the funds the following day at Banco Nacional, a “dramatic” episode in the words of Roberto Irineu, Marinho's eldest son. Marinho was so grateful that when José Luiz left Banco Nacional, he insistently invited him to be president of Organizações Globo, Newspaper and TV. According to José Luiz, the invitation was not accepted due to the lack of existential conditions.

In 1972, Lins, then vice president of Banco Nacional, resigned from his post. The bank, which had few branches when he started to work, had become the country's second largest banking institution. After leaving, he served as a consultant and advisor to Grupo Atlântica Boavista de Seguros, president of Light, CEO of Banerj and advisor to the Court of Auditors of the State of Rio de Janeiro, where he retired at the age of 70 in 1999.

== Biography ==
=== Early career ===
José Luiz de Magalhães Lins was the grandson of Edmundo Lins, minister and president of the Federal Supreme Court in 1917. From the city of Arcos, the family moved to Rio de Janeiro, residing in the Engenho Novo neighborhood.

Having been raised by his parents with great financial difficulties, José Luiz interrupted his studies at the age of 14 to work as an autonomous seller of Intercap capitalization bonds. At 16, he was admitted as a supernumerary and soon promoted to a supervisory agent in the Finance Department of the Finance Office of the State of Minas Gerais, in Rio de Janeiro. At 17, he was called to assist the finance secretary's office, a role he held for a few months in Belo Horizonte. The professional career suffered a brief interruption during 1948, in which he rendered military service in the Army, being approved for corporal.

=== From bank employee to banker ===
In 1948, at 19, he was hired as a practicing clerk at the recently created Banco Nacional de Minas Gerais, of which his uncle, Minas Gerais politician José de Magalhães Pinto, was one of the founders. He started as a typist until he became a regional manager. In 1959, he was elected deputy officer and, in 1960, at the age of 30, executive officer.

In 1970, he became vice president of the bank. In 1972, he resigned his position and all the other officer positions he held in companies of Grupo Nacional, which was extinguished in 1995. The bank had become the country's second largest financial institution under his command. His legacy: he created the bank slip, the personalized check, which only existed in the United States, built the first computer center to serve a company, created personal credit.

=== Bank slip and the insurance market ===
In 1966, the insurance market was going through a serious crisis in which debts accumulated, defaults rose, credibility fell and the risk of companies' bankruptcy was real. José Luiz, who joined Atlântica Boavista de Seguros, then created what is now known as a bank slip: the policy delivered by the broker to the client would only have value after it was paid through bank collection. With the publication of Decree No. 59,195, in the Federal Official Gazette, on 8 September 1966, the idea became law. It was the end of the dictatorship of brokers, the escalation of defaults and the risk of total loss of credibility in the insurance system.

=== Other positions ===
Lins held more than 50 positions throughout the profession, in areas such as insurance, trade, production and exports, in addition to the banking market. He was president of the banks Sotto Maior e Comercial de Minas Gerais, accumulating the vice-presidency of Banco Nacional de Minas Gerais; vice president and president of Banco Nacional de São Paulo; vice president of Banco Nacional do Espírito Santo; vice president of Banco Nacional de Brasília; vice president of Banco do Triângulo Mineiro; vice president of Banco Nacional de Investimentos; member of the board of directors of Banco do Estado da Guanabara; consultant and director of the board of directors and control of Bradesco; and CEO of Banerj Group.

Lins was the founder of Nacional - Cia. De Seguros; CEO of Empreendimentos e Participações JL S.A.; vice-president of Atlântica - Cia. Cia. Nacional de Seguros; vice president of Novo Rio, Crédito, Financiamento e Investimentos; president of Light - Serviços de Eletricidade S.A., at the time the largest private company in Brazil; founding partner of Provence Ervas Finas Ltda; president of the State of Rio de Janeiro's Financial Programming Council (Conferj); and advisor to the Rio de Janeiro State Court of Auditors (TCE-RJ).

=== The influence on the arts ===
As the head of Banco Nacional de Minas Gerais, Lins projected the institution as one of the greatest supporters of culture and the arts in Brazil, through financial support to personalities ranging from Grande Otelo to Garrincha, passing through new cinema names like Cacá Diegues, Glauber Rocha and Luiz Carlos Barreto.

Lins also played an important role in a new way of expanding the arts market. In 1960, he joined Franco Terranova, founder of Petit Galerie, and José de Carvalho, owner of Ducal stores. In a space designed by Sergio Bernardes, in Praça General Osório, in Ipanema, they promoted the great phase of art auctions and exclusive contracts with the greatest painters of the time. In music, his contribution was a loan to Roberto Quartin, creator of the label Forma, which would become the great granary of bossa nova. In theater, he was the main collaborator in the founding of Teatro Santa Rosa, in 1961, in Ipanema, and in his innovative proposal to present only Brazilian plays.

In 1954, Lins sponsored the largest literary competition organized in Brazil - the Walmap Award -, awarding unpublished novels with values that amounted to two million cruzeiros. In addition, he financed publishers such as Ênio Silveira, at the launch of the BUP collection of paperback books, owned by Editora Civilização Brasileira, which gave the rights to the publisher, writers like Nelson Rodrigues in newspaper columns. Also, through a loan, he helped the creation of the Pif-Paf newspaper. In 1964, he sponsored the publisher-bookstore José Olympio in the publishing of Minha Vida, Charles Chaplin.

Lins also participated, as a benefactor, with other people, in the construction of “Edifício da Amizade”, at PUC-RJ, where true postgraduate courses began, some of which had never been offered before in Brazil. The recognition came in the form of bronze plaques, with the names engraved on the columns in the inner courtyard of the university.

=== In politics and in the media ===
In 1961, when Jânio Quadros resigned, Lins participated in the movement for the recognition of the legitimacy of João Goulart as president. Jango came to the presidency and invited him to head the plebiscite campaign for the return of presidentialism, which ended victorious in 1963.

Lins participated in the changes that culminated in the 1964 Civil-Military Coup, representing his uncle, Magalhães Pinto, governor of Minas Gerais. General Castelo Branco, chief of the General Staff called him, to see if it was still possible to delay the deployment of General Mourão Filho's troops in Juiz de Fora. Less than an hour later, he was already at General Castelo Branco's house, informing him that Magalhães Pinto could no longer retreat.

Lins also conducted, along with Brigadier Eduardo Gomes, the negotiations for the departure of Juscelino Kubitschek and his family safely abroad, when the former president was threatened with imprisonment. In addition to advising some of the most influential political and economic leaders in the country, Lins, although averse to cameras and microphones, cultivated great friendship with two of the greatest exponents of the media in Brazil: Roberto Marinho (Rede Globo) and Nascimento Britto (Jornal do Brasil). He was also friend to other important persons in the media, such as Chagas Freitas (O Dia), Otto Lara Resende, Carlos Castello Branco, José Aparecido de Oliveira, Evandro Carlos de Andrade, Ibrahim Sued, Carlos Lemos and Samuel Wainer, as well as journalist José Gonçalves Fontes, who had been the most awarded in Brazil, including his name published on the ABI website, with his complete Biography on 29 April 2010.

=== Personal life and death ===
Lins was married from 1961 to Maria do Carmo Nabuco de Magalhães Lins; they had five children.

Lins died on 3 February 2023, at the age of 93, in his home in Rio de Janeiro.
