= Luiz Alberto Moniz Bandeira =

Brazilian writer (1935–2017)

Luiz Alberto de Vianna Moniz Bandeira
- Luiz Alberto Moniz Bandeira
- Born: 30 December 1935; Salvador, Bahia, Brazil
- Died: 10 November 2017 (aged 81)
- Education: University of São Paulo
- Occupations: Writer, Professor, Political Scientist, Historian, Poet
- Known for: His extensive literary and historical works
- Awards: Juca Pato Prize, Brazilian Intellectual of 2005, Order of Rio Branco (Grand Officer), Order of May, German Cross of Merit

Luiz Alberto de Vianna Moniz Bandeira (30 December 1935, Salvador, Bahia, Brazil – 10 November 2017) was a Brazilian writer, professor, political scientist, historian and poet.

== Early life ==
Luiz Alberto de Vianna Moniz Bandeira is a descendant of the early settlers of Brazil, several times, the Casa da Torre ("House of the Tower") family in particular (Garcia d'Ávila descendants family). Moniz Bandeira's work O Feudo – A Casa da Torre de Garcia d'Ávila describes the history of the Casa da Torre throughout the centuries, from the 16th century to the independence of Brazil. He is also a descendant of Diogo Álvares Correia, the "Caramuru", famous colonizer of Brazil. Bandeira started writing poems at an early age. His first book, Verticais, was published in 1956 when he was 20 years old. In 1960, he published another, Retrato e Tempo. While in law school, Bandeira, worked for newspapers in Rio de Janeiro such as Correio da Manhã and Diário de Notícias, and participated in political life as a socialist militant linked to the Brazilian Labour Party. When the 1964 coup d'état overthrew President João Goulart, Bandeira fled into exile in Uruguay.

He returned to Brazil some years later and led a clandestine life, continuing his historical research and writing, while participating in the resistance against the military regime. He was subsequently arrested by the Brazilian Navy and spent two years as a political prisoner.

== Later work ==
After being freed at the end of 1973, Bandeira went back to São Paulo, where he became professor at the Escola de Sociologia e Política de São Paulo. In 1976, he received grants from, among other institutions, the Ford Foundation, to conduct research in Argentina, Uruguay, and Paraguay on Brazil's historical role in the Río de la Plata Basin. From 1977 through 1979, he extended this research project to the United States and Europe, thanks to a post-doctoral fellowship awarded by the Social Science Research Council and the Joint Committee on Latin America Studies of the American Council of Learned Societies in New York.

Bandeira graduated in juridical sciences, and also holds a Ph.D. in political science from the University of São Paulo. He held the Chair of History of Brazilian Foreign Policy in the Department of History at the University of Brasília. He was awarded the Juca Pato Prize and named as Brazilian Intellectual of 2005 for the book Formação do Império Americano (Da Guerra contra a Espanha à Guerra no Iraque). He was subsequently awarded an honorary doctorate by UniBrasil in Curitiba. Bandeira has been invited to lecture in many countries around the world. He was an Under-Secretary in Rio de Janeiro's State Government, being its representative in the federal capital, Brasília, from 1991 through 1994 and a cultural attaché at the Consulate-General of Brazil in Frankfurt am Main from 1996 through 2002. Bandeira has been awarded the Order of Rio Branco (Grand Officer), the Order of May, and the German Cross of Merit. He taught at the Pontifical Catholic University of Rio de Janeiro and at the University of Brasília.

Bandeira died on 10 November 2017 at the age of 81.

== Works ==
He has written prolifically and published more than 20 books. Among Moniz Bandeira's books are:

- O 24 de agosto de Janio Quadros (1961)
- O Caminho da Revolução Brasileira (1962)
- O Ano Vermelho – A Revolução Russa e seus Reflexos no Brasil (1967)
- Presença dos Estados Unidos no Brasil (dois séculos de história) (1973, translated into Russian and published in the Soviet Union in 1982) ISBN 9788520007976
- Cartéis e Desnacionalização – A experiência Brasiliera: 1964/1974 (1975)
- O Governo João Goulart – As lutas sociais no Brasil (1961–1964) (1977)
- O Expansionismo Brasileiro e a Formação dos Estados da Bacia do Prata (1985); translated into Spanish and published in Argentina under the title La Formación de los Estados en la Cuenca del Plata (2006)
- Brasil-Estados Unidos: a Rivalidade Emergente - 1950-1988 (1989)
- O Eixo Argentina-Brasil - O Processo de Integração na América Latina (1987)
- De Marti a Fidel – A Revolução Cubana e a América Latina (1998)
- A reunificação da Alemanha - Do Ideal Socialista ao Socialismo Real (1992)
- Estado nacional e Política Internacional na América Latina - 0 continente nas relações Argentina-Brasil - 1930 - 1992 (1993)
- 0 Milagre Alemão e o desenvolvimento do Brasil: as relações da Alemanha com o Brasil e a América Latina 1949 -1994 (1994), translated and published in Germany by Verwuert Verlag (1995)
- O Feudo – A Casa da Torre de Garcia d’Ávila (Da conquista dos sertões à independência do Brasil (2000)
- Brasil, Argentina e Estados Unidos - Conflito e integração na América do Sul (Da Tríplice Aliança ao Mercosul) (1993) (translated into Spanish and published in Argentina under the title Argentina, Brasil y Estados Unidos (De la Triple Alianza al Mercosur) (2004)
- As Relações Perigosas: Brasil-Estados Unidos (De Collor a Lula) (2004)
- Formação do Império Americano (Da Guerra contra a Espanha à Guerra no Iraque) (2005)
- A Desordem Mundial (2016). English: The World disorder. US Hegemony, Proxy Wars, Terrorism and Humanitarian Catastrophes. Springer 2019, ISBN 9783030032036
