= 2025 Brazil blackout =

The 2025 Brazil blackout was a power outage that affected all 26 states of Brazil and the Federal District on 14 October 2025. The outage began at 00:32 Brasília Time (UTC−03:00) and lasted from a few minutes to up to two and a half hours, depending on the region. According to the Operador Nacional do Sistema Elétrico (ONS), the blackout was caused by a fire in a reactor at the Bateias Substation, located in Campo Largo, in the state of Paraná.

== Cause ==
The ONS reported that the blackout originated from a fire in a reactor at the 500 kV Bateias Substation in Campo Largo, Paraná. The fire disconnected the energy flow between the South and Southeast/Central-West regions, triggering a large-scale contingency in the National Interconnected System (SIN). Approximately 10 megawatts (MW) of load were deliberately disconnected as a preventive measure to stabilize the network.

The Minister of Mines and Energy, Alexandre Silveira, stated that the incident was a “technical electrical problem” and not related to lack of planning or supply shortage. He announced that the ministry's inspection team and the National Electric Energy Agency (ANEEL) would investigate the causes of the fire, alongside the Federal Police.

== Affected areas ==
Map of the affected area.

The blackout affected all 26 states of Brazil and the Federal District. Power was restored within 1 hour and 30 minutes in the North, Northeast, and Southeast/Central-West regions, while the South Region took up to 2 hours and 30 minutes to be fully restored.

The outage temporarily disrupted telecommunications, public transport, and water supply services in several major cities, including São Paulo, Curitiba, Recife, and Manaus. Airports and hospitals operated on emergency power systems until service normalization.

== Impact ==
=== Transportation ===
Several subway systems and urban train networks were interrupted during the outage. In São Paulo, the São Paulo Metro operated on reduced speed between 00:30 and 02:00. In Curitiba, bus terminals temporarily suspended electronic ticket validation due to the power cut. Airports in São Paulo and Brasília reported brief interruptions in boarding procedures but no flight cancellations.

=== Water and communications ===
In some areas of Amapá, Bahia, and Amazonas, water pumping stations stopped functioning temporarily due to the lack of power supply. Telecommunication networks, including those of Claro, TIM, and Vivo, experienced short service interruptions in parts of the Northeast and North regions.

=== Internet and education ===
Internet connectivity was temporarily disrupted in several cities. Some universities and schools postponed morning classes due to the outage, particularly in the South Region and the Northeast Region.

== Recovery ==
According to ONS, the process of restoring the electrical system began immediately after the detection of the incident. By 01:30, approximately 80% of the national load had been reconnected, and the National Interconnected System was fully restored by 03:00.

The Companhia Paranaense de Energia (Copel) confirmed that the fire at the Bateias Substation had been controlled by the Paraná State Fire Department and reported that no injuries or damage to other equipment occurred.

== Aftermath ==
The company warned that indemnities will increase electricity bills, and Aneel projected that they will increase by 6,3%, referring to R$ 47.8 billion in subsidies. However, the Supreme Court published a decision changing the calculation of the amounts.

The expiration of the concession is studied for Enel by Aneel, after subsequent blackouts. Campaigns and hearings have been convened since then in the Legislative Assembly of Paraná (Alep), and other municipal chambers of the state, for the renationalization of Copel, and it's been the main focus of Partido dos Trabalhadores there.

== See also ==
- 2023 Brazil blackout
- Electricity sector in Brazil
- List of power outages
