= 2023 Brazil blackout =

Blackout in Brazil in 2023

The 2023 Brazil blackout was a power outage that occurred across Brazil on 15 August 2023 at 8:30 Brasília Time (UTC−03:00). It interrupted approximately 19 gigawatts of electric load, which was approximately 27% of the total load at that moment.

== Cause ==
According to the National Electric System Operator (Brazilian Portuguese: Operador Nacional do Sistema Elétrico, ONS), the blackout occurred due to the opening of the wide area synchronous grid between the North and Southeast regions of Brazil, in a 500 kilovolt circuit near Imperatriz, Maranhão. The exact cause of the blackout is currently unknown and under investigation.

The Minister of Mines and Energy, Alexandre Silveira, created a crisis chamber for investigating the cause of the blackout.

Silveira asked the Federal Police (PF) and the Brazilian Intelligence Agency (ABIN) to investigate whether the blackout was caused by human action.

== Affected areas ==
Map of the affected states

The blackout affected the Federal District and all states of Brazil, except Roraima which as of 2023 is not yet connected to the National Interconnected System.

The North region was most affected by the blackout, with a 83.8% drop in power supply, followed by the Northeast region, with a 44.4% drop.

== Impact ==
=== Subways ===
Subways in Brazil were interrupted by the blackout. In São Paulo, five lines were disrupted. The 4-Yellow subway line operated between 8:30 and 9:25 Brasília Time (UTC−03:00) with reduced speed. Passengers in São Paulo subways were oriented by sound warnings and by support and security agents. In Salvador, Bahia, the subway line stopped and passengers had to leave the trains and walk on the subway lines.

=== Water ===
In Amapá, the supply of water was suspended due to the blackout.

=== Schools ===
In Manaus, all schools were affected by the blackout and dismissed students at 8:30 Amazon Time (UTC−04:00) on 15 August 2023.

=== Internet and telecommunications ===
The blackout caused Internet and telecommunication services in Brazil to go down in some areas.

== Recovery ==
Shortly after the blackout, the process of restoring electricity began. By 9:16, 6 gigawatts of energy was restored.

Electricity in the South and Central-West regions was fully restored by 9:05 and 9:33, respectively.

By 10:22, 27% of the electrical charge in the North region and 68% in the Northeast region was restored, and by 11:00, electricity was fully restored in the Southeast region.

By 12:30, 41% of the electrical charge in the North region and 85% in the Northeast region was restored.

By 14:49, electricity was restored in all regions of Brazil.

== See also ==
- 2025 Brazil blackout
- List of power outages
