= Brizola Neto =

Brazilian politician (born 1978)

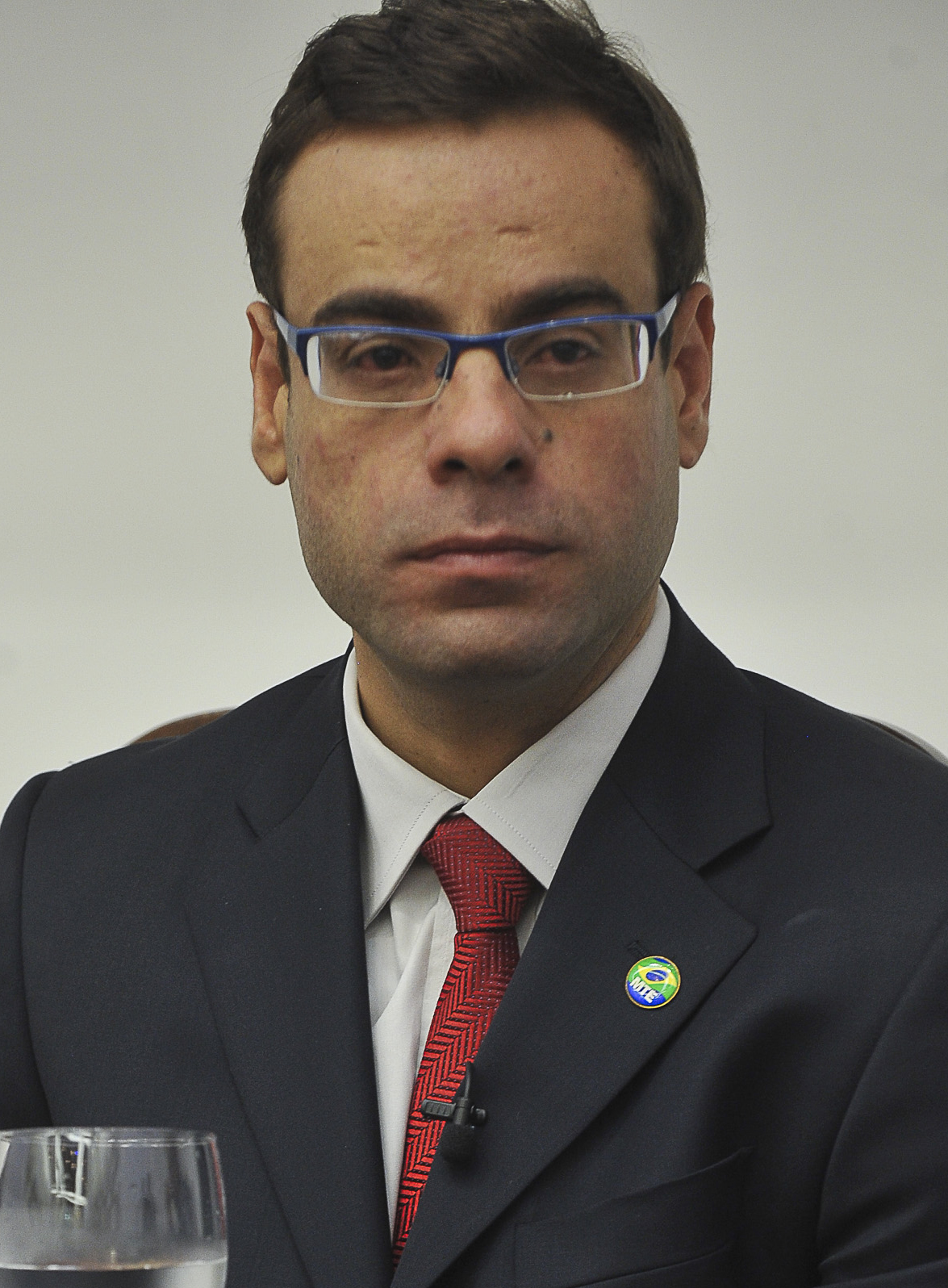
- Brizola Neto in 2012

Minister of Labor and Employment
- In office 3 May 2012 – 13 March 2013
- Preceded by: Paulo Roberto dos Santos Pinto (interim)
- Succeeded by: Manoel Dias

Federal deputy of Rio de Janeiro
- In office 1 February 2007 – 31 January 2011

Councilman of Rio de Janeiro
- In office 1 January 2005 – 31 January 2007

Personal details
- Born: Carlos Daudt Brizola; 11 October 1978 (age 47) Porto Alegre, Rio Grande do Sul, Brazil
- Party: PDT (1997–2018); PPL (2018–2019); PCdoB (2019–2020); PDT (2020–present)
- Relatives: Juliana Brizola (sister); Leonel Brizola (grandfather); Neusinha Brizola (aunt)

Carlos Daudt Brizola, better known as Brizola Neto (born 11 October 1978), is a Brazilian politician, currently affiliated with the Democratic Labour Party (PDT), of which he was the former national president of its youth wing, Young Socialists. He has been a federal deputy from the state of Rio de Janeiro, as well as having been a councilman for the city of Rio de Janeiro. He was also the Labour and Employment minister during the Dilma Rousseff administration. He is the grandson of Leonel Brizola, as well as the brother of Porto Alegre councilwoman and state deputy in Rio Grande do Sul state Juliana Brizola.

He has also been a member of the Free Fatherland Party (PPL) and the Communist Party of Brazil (PCdoB), where he was at one point a member of the national directory. He returned to the PDT in 2020.

== Early life ==
Brizola Neto was born in Porto Alegre in 1978, while his grandfather, Leonel, had been in exile in Uruguay. Through his father, he is the great-nephew of former president João Goulart. On his mother's side, he is the grandson of aeronautic captain Alfredo Daudt, who was one of the service members who stopped the take-off of FAB jets that were sent to bomb Piratini Palace during the Legality Campaign.

Brizola Neto moved with his family to Rio de Janeiro in 1982, when his grandfather was elected governor of the state. Starting at 16, he worked as his grandfather's private secretary.

== Political career ==
=== Councilman ===
Elected in 2004, Brizola Neto first became a councilman at the Municipal Chamber of Rio de Janeiro. Two years after he was elected, he became a federal deputy for Rio de Janeiro in 2006, thus resigning from his seat early. During his time as councilman, he proposed various laws, such as fixed time periods for services for clients of banking agencies and to reduce the height of steps on buses.

=== Federal deputy ===
Brizola Neto was elected a deputy federal with 62,091 votes in 2006, assuming office on 1 February 2007. During his time as deputy, he became one of the 100 “heads” of the National Congress. In 2009 and again in 2010, he was listed by DIAP as one of the most active members of Congress.

He proposed the law that would create the accreditation system for graduate courses, to avoid delaying the process of recognizing diplomas from other countries that are a part of Mercosur. He was reelected federal deputy in 2010 with 55,564 votes, but became the Minister of Labour and Employment afterwards. He ran again in 2014, and obtained 23,720, but only became a substitute candidate for the PDT in Rio de Janeiro.

=== Minister of Labour and Employment ===
On 30 April 2012, he was announced by the Rousseff administration to become the new Labour and Employment minister, taking office on 3 May 2012. On 15 March 2013, it was announced that he had left the position. He was succeeded by Manoel Dias, who was the secretary-general of the PDT and the state president of the Santa Catarina branch.

=== Pre-candidacy for Vice-governor of Rio de Janeiro ===
On 23 March 2018, Brizola Neto was announced to be the candidate for vice-governor for former governor Anthony Garotinho's run for governor of Rio de Janeiro later that year. The announcement was made at a club in Tijuca. At the same event, Brizola Neto announced that he had left the PDT for the PPL. However, later on, he was replaced by Leide Duarte, a councilwoman from Duque de Caxias.
