= Fernando Bezerra Coelho =

Brazilian politician

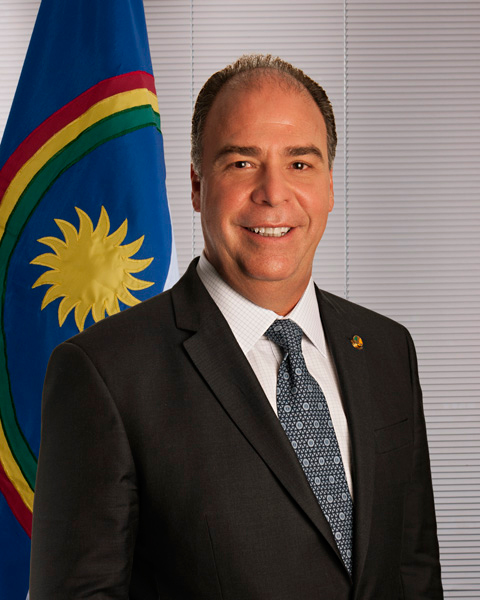

Senator for Pernambuco
- In office February 1, 2015 – February 1, 2023
- Preceded by: Jarbas Vasconcelos
- Succeeded by: Teresa Leitão

Senate Government Leader
- In office February 19, 2019 – December 15, 2021
- Preceded by: Romero Jucá
- Succeeded by: Carlos Portinho

Minister of National Integration
- In office January 1, 2011 – October 1, 2013
- President: Dilma Rousseff
- Preceded by: João Santana
- Succeeded by: Francisco Teixeira

Member of the Chamber of Deputies
- In office February 1, 1987 – January 31, 1992
- Constituency: Pernambuco

Personal details
- Born: December 7, 1957 (age 68) Petrolina, Pernambuco, Brazil
- Party: MDB (2017–present)
- Other political affiliations: PDS (1982–86); PFL (1986); PMDB (1986–97); PPS (1997–2005); PSB (2005–17)
- Children: Fernando Coelho Filho; Miguel Coelho; Antônio Coelho

Fernando Bezerra Coelho (born December 7, 1957) is a Brazilian politician. He had represented Pernambuco in the Federal Senate from 2015 to 2023. Previously he was the Minister of National Integration from 2011 to 2013 and a Deputy from Pernambuco from 1987 to 1992. He is a member of the Brazilian Democratic Movement Party.

On 25 February 2026, he and his sons, former mayor of Petrolina Miguel Coelho and congressman Fernando Filho (União-PE), are among the targets of an operation launched by the Federal Police (PF), which investigates suspicions of irregular business dealings financed with parliamentary amendment funds involving the city of Petrolina, Pernambuco.

Federal Senate
| Preceded by Romero Jucá | Senate Government Leader; 2019–2021 | Vacant Title next held by Carlos Portinho |
