= Moreira Franco =

Brazilian politician (born 1944)

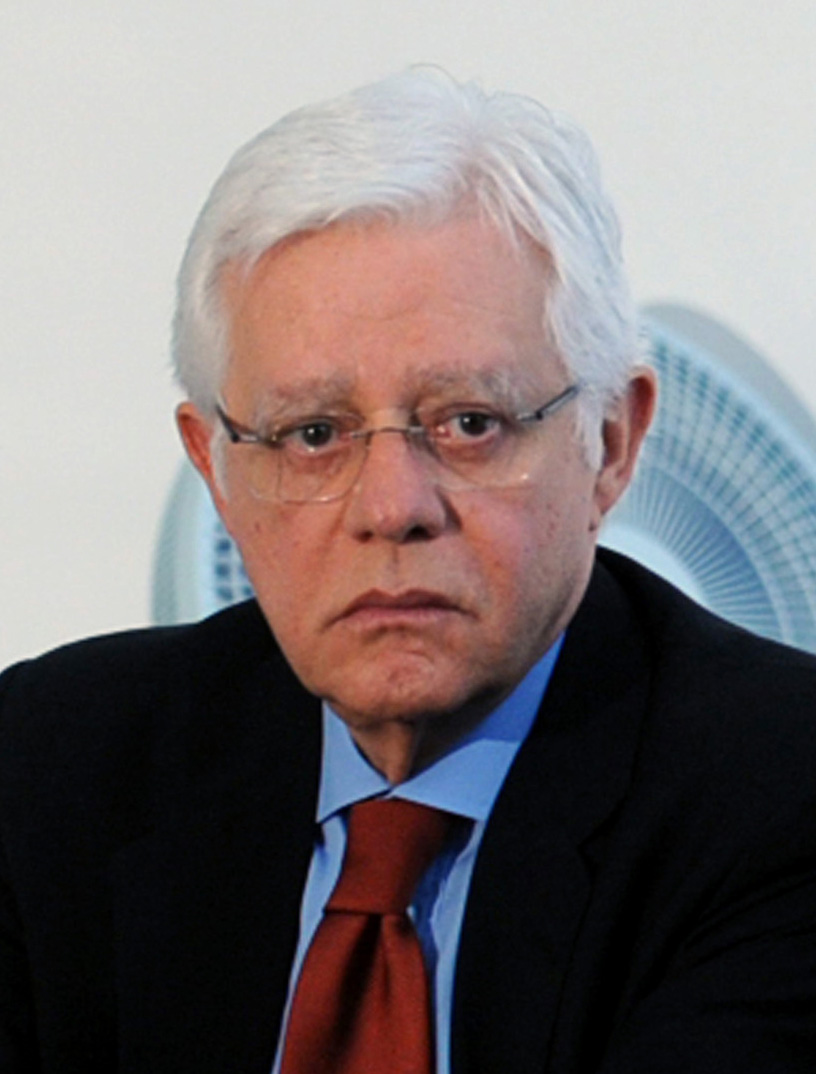

Minister of Mines and Energy
- In office 10 April 2018 – 31 December 2018
- President: Michel Temer
- Preceded by: Fernando Coelho Filho
- Succeeded by: Bento Costa Lima

General Secretary of the Presidency
- In office 3 February 2017 – 10 April 2018
- President: Michel Temer
- Preceded by: Miguel Rossetto
- Succeeded by: Joaquim de Oliveira

Secretary of the Investment and Partnership Program
- In office 12 May 2016 – 3 February 2017
- President: Michel Temer
- Preceded by: Office established
- Succeeded by: Office abolished

Minister of Civil Aviation
- In office 16 March 2013 – 31 December 2014
- President: Dilma Rousseff
- Preceded by: Wagner Bittencourt
- Succeeded by: Eliseu Padilha

Minister of Strategic Affairs
- In office 1 January 2011 – 15 March 2013
- President: Dilma Rousseff
- Preceded by: Samuel Pinheiro Guimarães
- Succeeded by: Marcelo Neri

Member of the Chamber of Deputies
- In office 1 February 2003 – 1 February 2007
- Constituency: Rio de Janeiro
- In office 1 February 1995 – 1 February 1999
- Constituency: Rio de Janeiro
- In office 1 February 1975 – 31 January 1977
- Constituency: Rio de Janeiro

Governor of Rio de Janeiro
- In office 15 March 1987 – 15 March 1991
- Lieutenant: Francisco Amaral
- Preceded by: Leonel Brizola
- Succeeded by: Leonel Brizola

Mayor of Niterói
- In office 31 January 1977 – 15 April 1982
- Deputy: Armando Barcelos
- Preceded by: Ronaldo Fabrício
- Succeeded by: Armando Barcelos

Personal details
- Born: Wellington Moreira Franco; 19 October 1944 (age 82) Teresina, Piauí, Brazil
- Party: MDB (2017–present)
- Other political affiliations: PMDB (1981–2017); MDB (1972–1981)
- Spouses: Celina Vargas do Amaral Peixoto (m. 1969; div. 1989) Clara Maria Vasconcelos Torres (m. 1993)
- Education: Pontifical Catholic University of Rio de Janeiro

Wellington Moreira Franco (Portuguese pronunciation: [ˈwɛlĩɡtõ moˈɾejɾɐ ˈfɾɐ̃ku]; born October 19, 1944) is a Brazilian politician who served as the 54th Governor of Rio de Janeiro from 1987 to 1991 and Minister of Mines and Energy in 2018. He is a member of the Brazilian Democratic Movement (MDB).

A native of Teresina, Piauí, Franco taught Sociology at Fluminense Federal University. Installed as the 48th Mayor of Niterói in 1977, he retained the office until 1982. Franco served as a Federal Deputy from Rio de Janeiro, Minister of Strategic Affairs, Minister for Civil Aviation, Secretary of the Investment and Partnership Program and Secretary-General of the Presidency. On March 21, 2019, he was arrested on corruption charges alongside former President Michel Temer.

Political offices
Preceded by Ronaldo Fabrício	Mayor of Niterói; 1977–1983	Succeeded by Armando Barcelos
Preceded by Leonel Brizola	Governor of Rio de Janeiro; 1987–1991	Succeeded by Leonel Brizola
Preceded by Samuel Pinheiro Guimarães	Minister of Strategic Affairs; 2011–2013	Succeeded by Marcelo Neri
Preceded by Wagner Bittencourt	Minister of Civil Aviation; 2013–2015	Succeeded by Eliseu Padilha
Preceded by Miguel Rossetto	Secretary-General of the Presidency; 2017–2018	Succeeded by Joaquim de Oliveira
Preceded by Fernando Coelho Filho	Minister of Mines and Energy; 2018–2019	Succeeded by Bento Costa Lima
