= Adolfo Sachsida =

Brazilian lawyer and economist

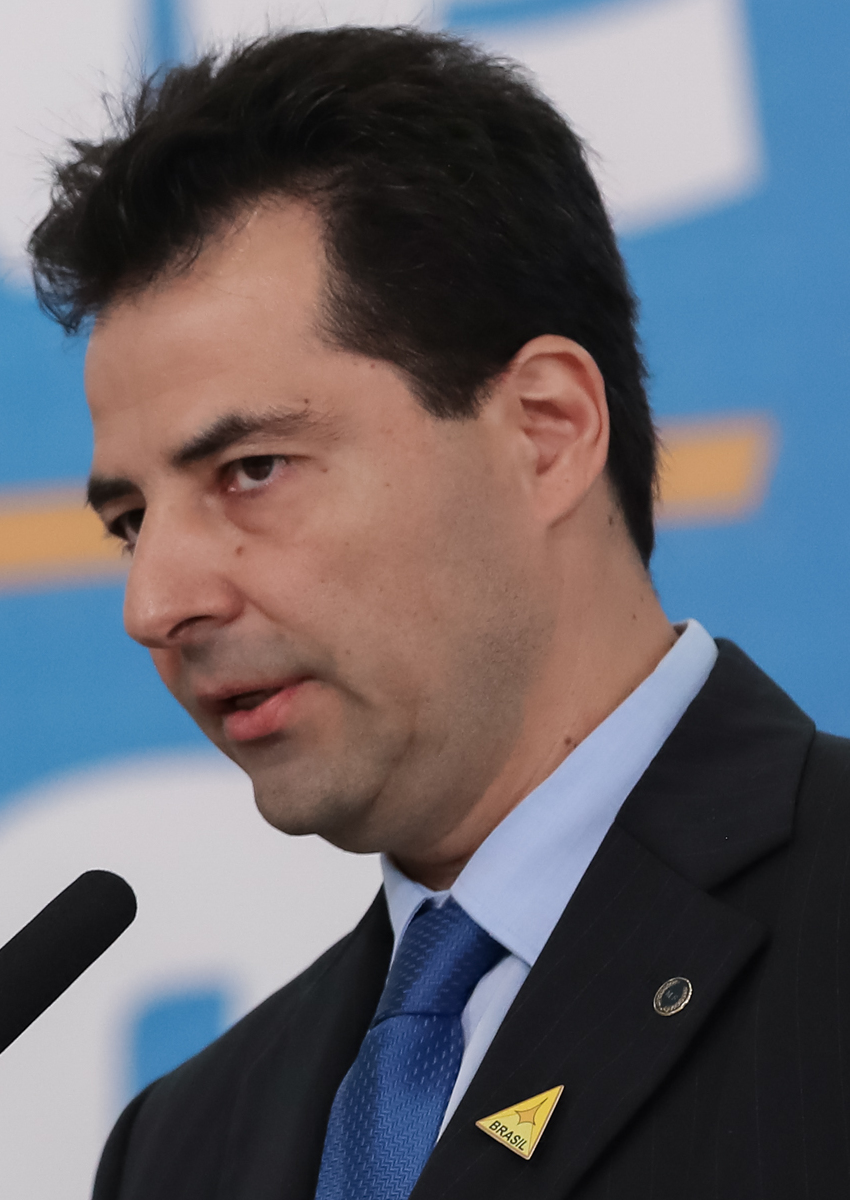

Minister of Mines and Energy
- In office 11 May 2022 – 1 January 2023
- President: Jair Bolsonaro
- Preceded by: Bento Costa Lima
- Succeeded by: Alexandre Silveira

Chief of Special Advisory for Strategic Affairs of the Ministry of the Economy
- In office 2 February 2022 – 11 May 2022
- Minister: Paulo Guedes
- Preceded by: Daniella Marques
- Succeeded by: Rogério Boueri

Secretary of Economic Policies
- In office 1 January 2019 – 1 February 2022
- Minister: Paulo Guedes
- Succeeded by: Pedro Calhman de Miranda

Personal details
- Born: 4 October 1972 (age 54) Londrina, Paraná, Brazil
- Education: State University of Londrina (BSc); Centro Universitário de Brasília (LL.B.); University of Brasília (MEc, D.S.)
- Occupation: Economist, lawyer

Adolfo Sachsida (born 4 October 1972) is a Brazilian lawyer and economist.

He composed the economics team of Jair Bolsonaro until May 11, 2022, when he was appointed Minister of Mining and Energy.

== Personal life and academic background ==
Born in Londrina, in the north of Paraná, he graduated in Economics from the State University of Londrina (UEL) in 1994, and in 2015 graduated in Law from the Unified Education Center of Brasília (CEUB).

He holds a Master's and PhD in Economics from the University of Brasilia (UnB).

Political offices
Office established	Secretary of Economic Policies; 2019–2022	Succeeded by Pedro Calhman de Miranda
Preceded by Daniella Marques	Chief of Special Advisory for Strategic Affairs of the Ministry of the Economy; 2022	Succeeded by Rogério Boueri
Preceded by Bento Costa Lima	Minister of Mines and Energy; 2022–2023	Succeeded by Alexandre Silveira
