= Bento Costa Lima =

Brazilian admiral

Bento Albuquerque
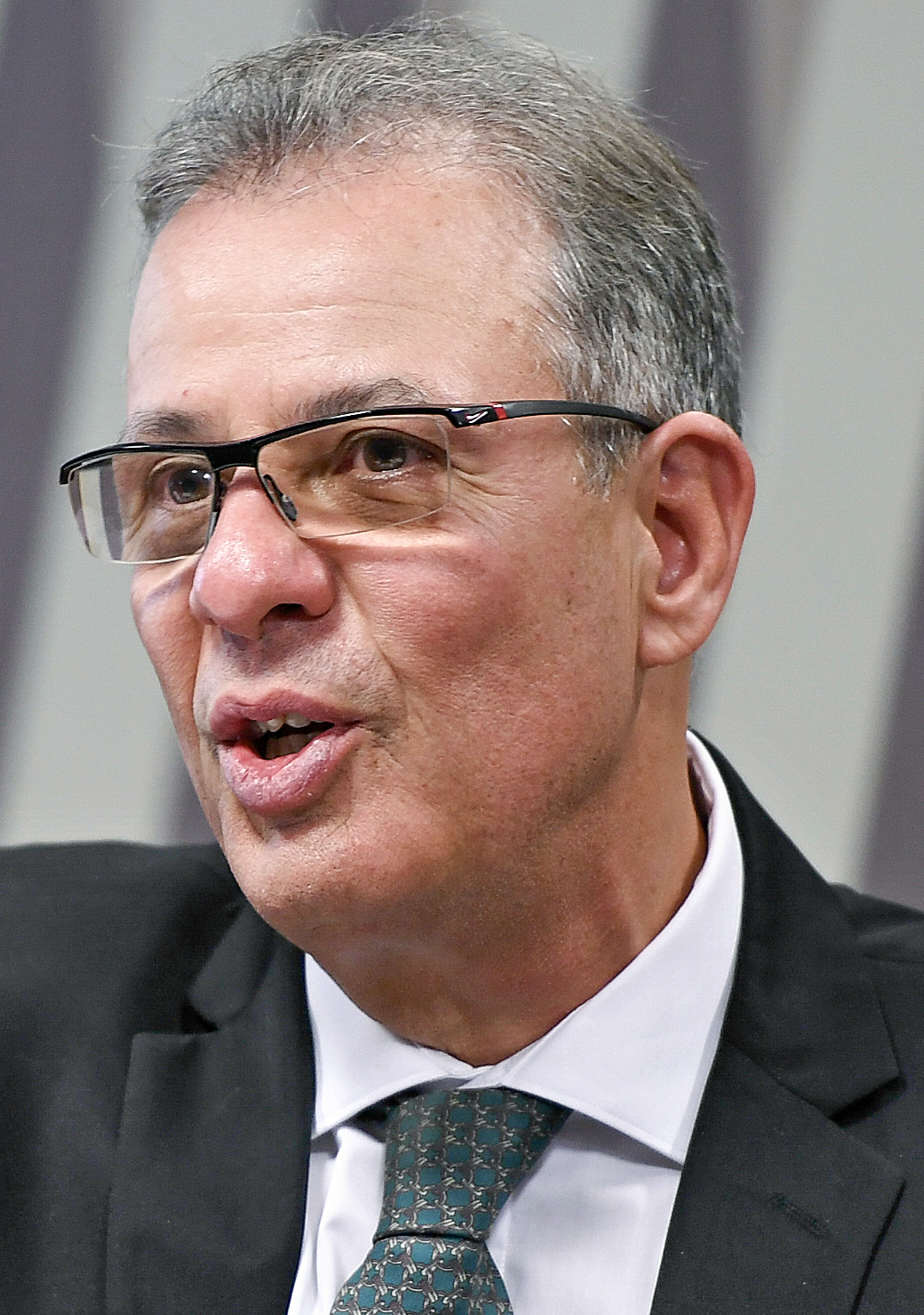

Minister of Mines and Energy
- In office 1 January 2019 – 11 May 2022
- President: Jair Bolsonaro
- Preceded by: Moreira Franco
- Succeeded by: Adolfo Sachsida

Personal details
- Born: Bento Costa Lima Leite de Albuquerque Júnior; 3 August 1958 (age 68) Rio de Janeiro, Rio de Janeiro, Brazil
- Education: Brazilian Naval School

Military service
- Allegiance: Brazil
- Branch/service: Brazilian Navy
- Rank: Admiral

Bento Costa Lima Leite de Alburquerque Júnior (born 3 August 1958) is a Brazilian admiral who had served as Minister of Mines and Energy.

== Biography ==
Joined the Brazilian Navy in 1973, occupied many offices in the institution. Among them, as military observer in the UN Peacekeeping Missions in the sectors of Sarajevo, Bosnia and Herzegovina, Dubrovnik, in the former Yugoslavia, Commander in the Submarine Base Admiral Castro e Silva, Commander-in-Chief of the Squad and Secretary of Science, Technology and Innovation of the Brazilian Navy.

Headed the Division of Technology of the Staff in 2006, which later became the Secretariat of Science, Technology and Innovation of the Navy. Between 2007 and 2008, he became parliamentary chief-assistant of the Navy Commander Cabinet, participating in the agreements of strategic partnership of the Program of Development of Submarines (Prosub) between France and Brazil.

Later, Albuquerque became Commander of the Submarine Force and Chief of Staff of the Navy Commander. In 2016, headed the General Directory of Nuclear and Technological Development of the Navy. Current, became the new Minister of Mines and Energy,

On 18 March 2020, Costa Lima had tested positive for COVID-19.

== Medals and awards ==
During his career, Admiral Bento received many medals in awards, being some of them:

- Order of the Naval Merit - Commander
- Order of Defence Merit - Commander
- Order of Military Merit - Commander
- Order of Aeronautical Merit - Commander
- Order of the Military Judiciary Merit - High Distinction

Political offices
Preceded by Moreira Franco	Minister of Mines and Energy; 2019–2022	Succeeded by Adolfo Sachsida
