= Antônio Coelho =

Brazilian politician (born 1995)

Member of the Legislative Assembly of Pernambuco
- Incumbent
- Assumed office 1 February 2019

Personal details
- Born: 20 May 1995 (age 31)
- Party: Brazil Union
- Parent: Fernando Bezerra Coelho (father)
- Relatives: Fernando Coelho Filho (brother); Miguel Coelho (brother)

Antônio de Souza Leão Coelho (born 20 May 1995) is a Brazilian politician serving as a member of the Legislative Assembly of Pernambuco since 2019. He is the son of Fernando Bezerra Coelho and the brother of Fernando Coelho Filho and Miguel Coelho.
