= Paulo Roberto dos Santos Pinto =

Brazilian politician (born 1972)

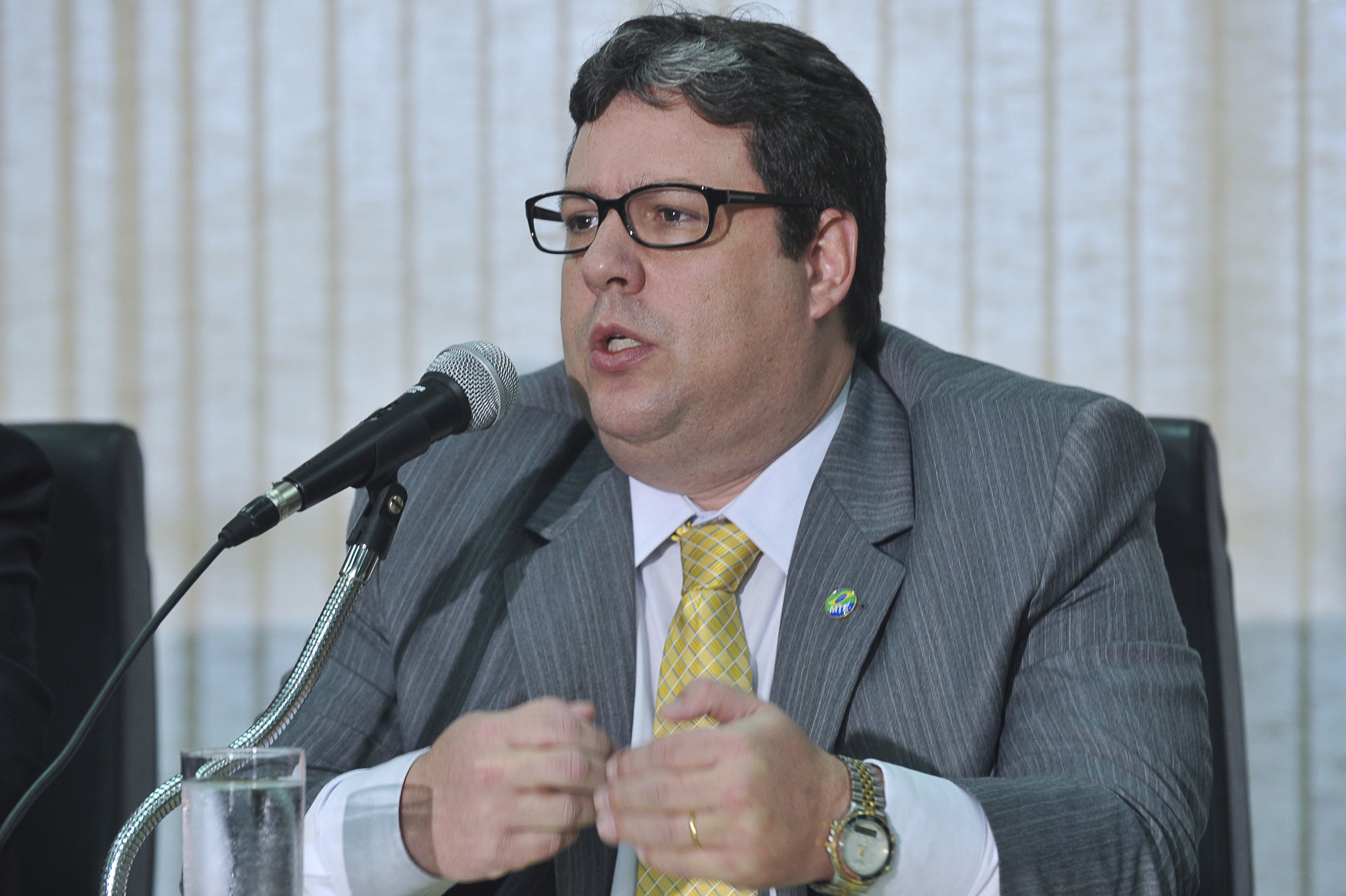

Minister of Labor and Employment (interim)
- In office 5 December 2011 – 3 May 2012
- Preceded by: Carlos Lupi
- Succeeded by: Brizola Neto

Personal details
- Born: 22 January 1972 (age 53); Rio de Janeiro, Brazil

Paulo Roberto dos Santos Pinto (born 22 January 1972) is a Brazilian politician who briefly served as the interim Minister of Labor and Employment from December 2011 to May 2012.

He graduated with a law degree from the Faculdade de Direito Cândido Mendes and later completed a post-graduate degree in economic law from the Fundação Getulio Vargas. He became the interim Labor and Employment Minister after the then-minister Carlos Lupi resigned due to accusations of embezzlement, with Santos Pinto having previously been executive-secretary of the ministry. He was succeeded by Brizola Neto.
