= Leonel Brizola =

Brazilian politician (1922–2004)

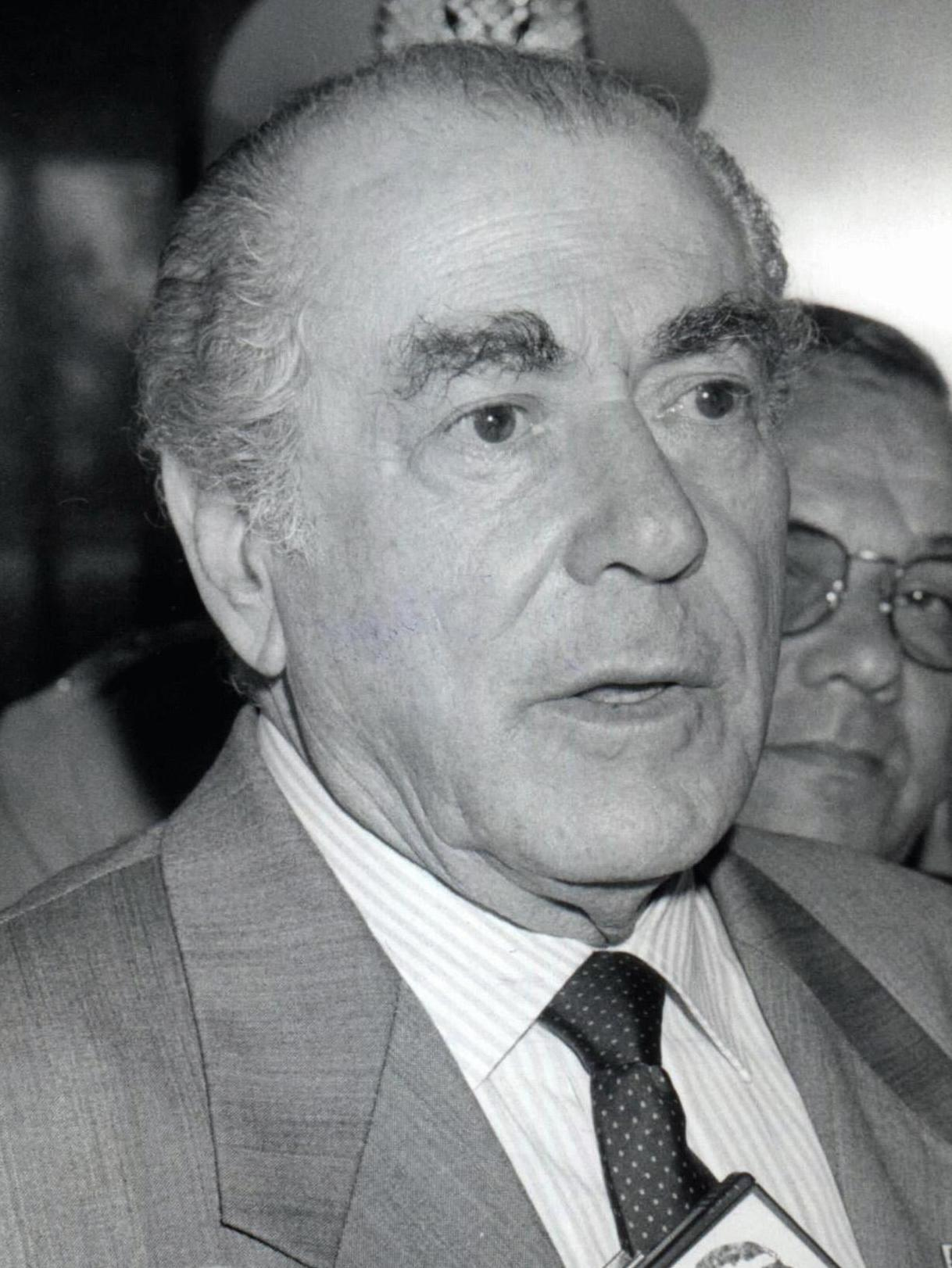
- Brizola in 1984

Governor of Rio de Janeiro
- In office 15 March 1991 – 1 April 1994
- Lieutenant: Nilo Batista
- Preceded by: Moreira Franco
- Succeeded by: Nilo Batista
- In office 15 March 1983 – 15 March 1987
- Lieutenant: Darcy Ribeiro
- Preceded by: Chagas Freitas
- Succeeded by: Moreira Franco

Member of the Chamber of Deputies
- In office 2 February 1963 – 1 February 1964
- Constituency: Guanabara
- In office 2 February 1955 – 30 December 1958
- Constituency: Rio Grande do Sul

Governor of Rio Grande do Sul
- In office 29 March 1959 – 25 March 1963
- Preceded by: Ildo Meneghetti
- Succeeded by: Ildo Meneghetti

Mayor of Porto Alegre
- In office 1 January 1956 – 29 December 1958
- Deputy: Tristão Sucupira Viana
- Preceded by: Martim Aranha
- Succeeded by: Tristão Sucupira Viana

State Deputy of Rio Grande do Sul
- In office 10 March 1947 – 31 January 1955
- Constituency: At-large

Personal details
- Born: Leonel de Moura Brizola; 22 January 1922 Carazinho, Rio Grande do Sul, Brazil
- Died: 21 June 2004 (aged 82) Rio de Janeiro, Rio de Janeiro, Brazil
- Party: PDT (1979–2004); Independent (1964–1979); PTB (1945–1964)
- Spouse: Neusa Goulart (m. 1953; died 1993)
- Relations: João Goulart (brother-in-law); Juliana Brizola (granddaughter); Brizola Neto (grandson)
- Children: 3 (José Vicente, João Otávio and Neusinha)
- Education: Universidade Federal do Rio Grande do Sul
- Profession: Civil engineer

Leonel de Moura Brizola (Brazilian Portuguese pronunciation: [leoˈnɛl dʒi ˈmowɾɐ bɾiˈzɔlɐ]; 22 January 1922 – 21 June 2004) was a Brazilian politician. Launched into politics by Brazilian president Getúlio Vargas in the 1930–1950s, Brizola was the only politician to serve as elected governor of two Brazilian states. An engineer by training, Brizola organized the youth wing of the Brazilian Labour Party and served as state representative for Rio Grande do Sul and mayor of its capital, Porto Alegre.

In 1958 he was elected governor of Rio Grande do Sul and subsequently played a major role in thwarting a first coup attempt by sectors of the armed forces, who wished to prevent João Goulart from assuming the presidency following the resignation of Jânio Quadros in August 1961, under allegations of communist ties. Three years later, facing the 1964 Brazilian coup d'état that went on to install the Brazilian military dictatorship, Brizola called on the democratic forces to resist, but Goulart did not want to risk a civil war, and Brizola was exiled in Uruguay.

One of the few Brazilian major political figures able to overcome the dictatorship's twenty-years ban on his political activity, Brizola returned to Brazil in 1979, but failed in his bid to take control of the reemerging Brazilian Labour Party as the military government instead conceded it to Ivete Vargas. Brizola founded the Democratic Labour Party on a democratic socialist, nationalist and populist platform descended from Getúlio Vargas' own labour legacy, promoted as an ideology he called socialismo moreno ("tanned socialism"), a non-Marxist, Christian and markedly Brazilian left-wing political agenda for a post-Cold War setting.

In 1982 and 1990 Brizola was elected governor of Rio de Janeiro, after a failed 1989 bid for the presidency, in which he narrowly finished third, after Luiz Inácio Lula da Silva. In the 1990s, Brizola competed for preeminence in the Brazilian left with future president Lula's Workers' Party, later briefly integrating Lula's government in the early 2000s. He was also vice-president of the Socialist International and served as Honorary President of that organization from October 2003 until his death in June 2004. Known for his sharp, energetic rhetoric and frank, direct style, Brizola is considered one of the most important historic figures of the Brazilian left.

== Early life and rise to prominence (1922–1964) ==
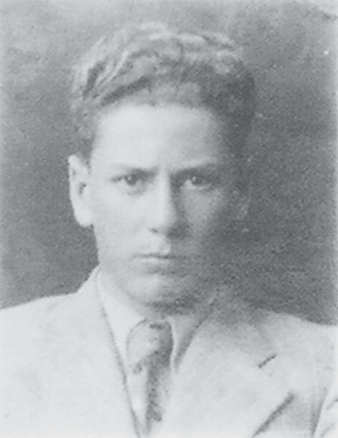
Brizola during the late 1930s

Brizola's father José Brizola was a small-scale farmer who was killed when fighting as a volunteer in 1923 in a local civil war for the rebel leader Assis Brasil against Rio Grande do Sul's governor Borges de Medeiros. Brizola was named Itagiba, but early in life he adopted the alias Leonel, which he took from the rebel warlord Leonel Rocha who had commanded the cavalry column in which José Brizola served. Brizola left his mother's house at the age of eleven; he worked in Passo Fundo and Carazinho as a newspaper deliverer, shoeshiner and at other occasional jobs. Aided by the family of a Methodist minister, he received a scholarship that allowed him to complete high school in Porto Alegre and enter college.

He graduated with a degree in engineering but never worked in that trade. Still as an undergraduate, he entered professional politics in his early twenties, joining the youth organization of the Brazilian Labor Party (Partido Trabalhista Brasileiro (PTB)) in 1945. In 1946 an undergraduate, he was elected to the Rio Grande State Legislature. The Labor Party had been created in order to offer political support for former president Getúlio Vargas among the working classes, and Brizola, who was busy with creating party organizations across Rio Grande do Sul, at the time developed ties to the Vargas family through his personal friendship with Vargas's son Maneco as well as with Vargas's brother Espartaco, such friendships opening his way to make friends with Vargas himself, who was in internal exile after having been toppled from power in late 1945. As a member of the State Legislature, Brizola made a speech from the tribune in which he launched nationwide the candidacy of Vargas to the incoming 1950 presidential elections.

In 1950, Brizola married Neusa Goulart—João Goulart's sister—and had Vargas as his best man. Through this marriage, Brizola became a wealthy landowner and a regional leader of the PTB. After Vargas's 1954 suicide during his second presidential term, Brizola inherited the undisputed regional leadership of his party while his brother-in-law ruled the PTB national caucus. Both perpetuated Vargas' populist tradition; in Brizola's case, the practice of a direct personal link between charismatic leader and the general public. In quick succession, Brizola filled various positions, being a member of the Rio Grande State Legislature for two terms (and as such leader for the PTB), State Secretary for Public Works, (interim) Federal Congressman for Rio Grande in 1955 and Mayor of Porto Alegre from 1956 to 1958. In 1958 he would resign from his mayoralty in order to present himself as a contender at the elections for State Governor. From a regional leadership, Brizola would then ascend, during the presidency of Goulart (1961–1964) to the role of an important national supporter of his brother-in-law; first as governor and later as a deputy in the National Congress of Brazil.

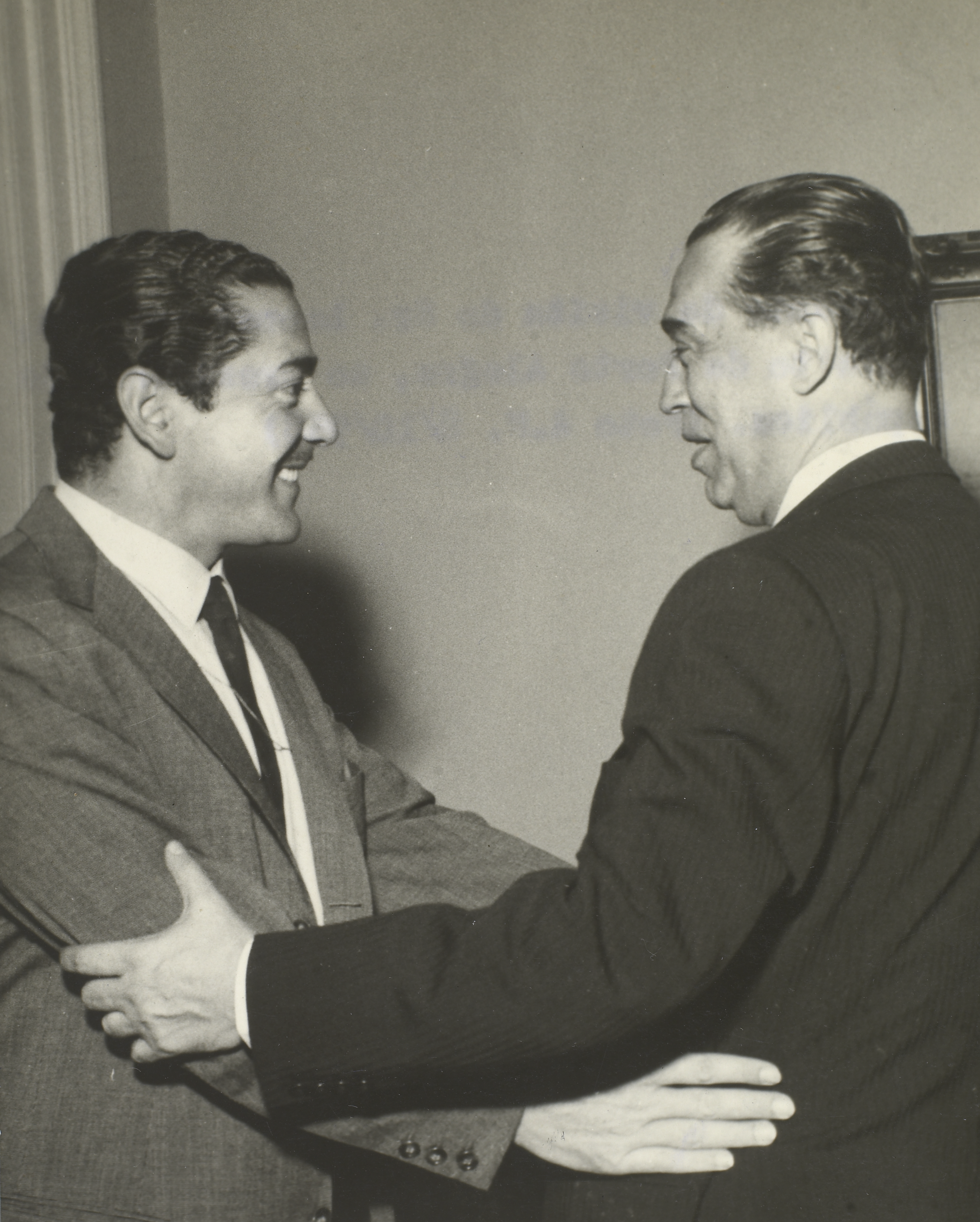
Brizola (left) greets President Juscelino Kubitschek in October 1958

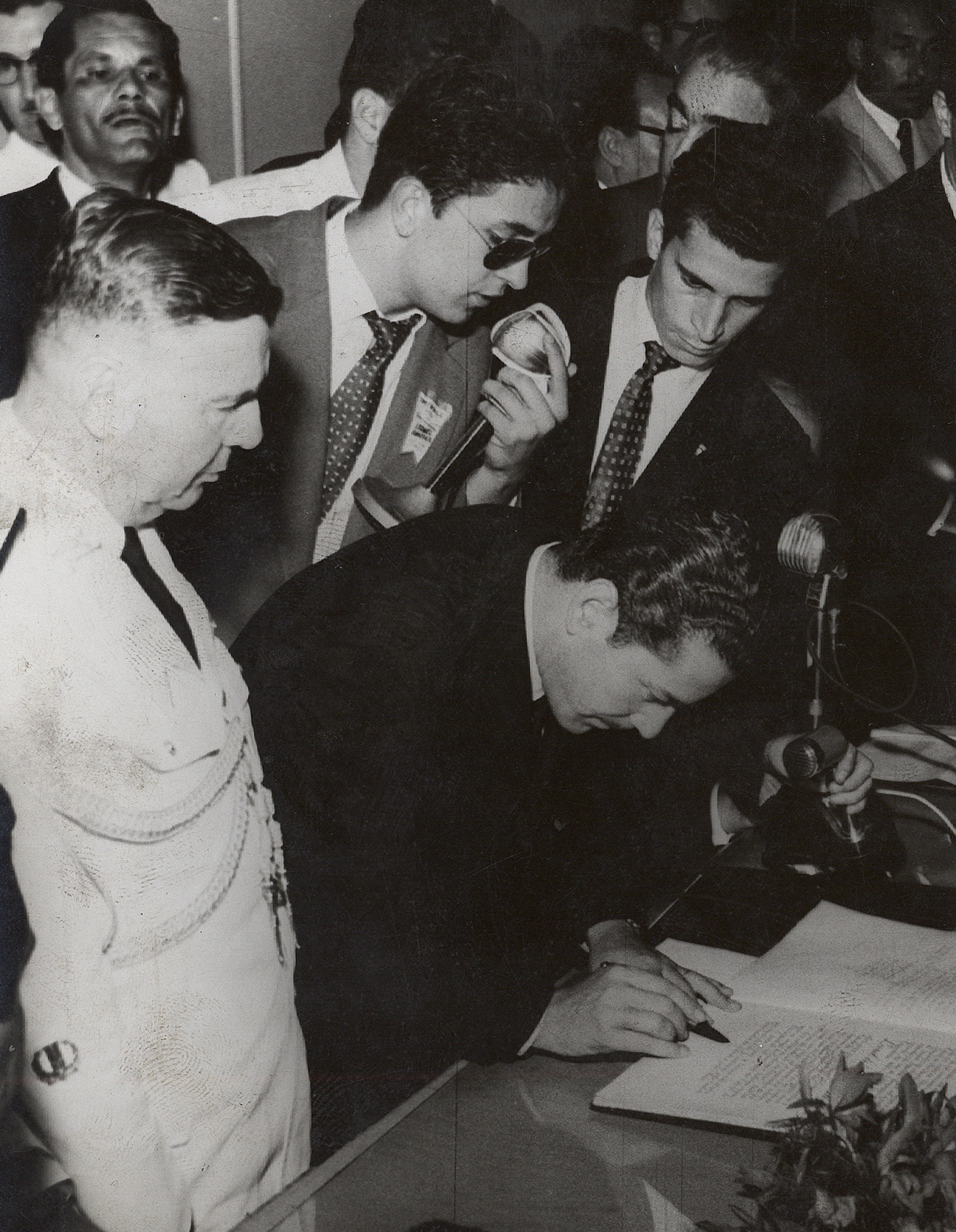
Brizola during his inauguration ceremony as governor of Rio Grande do Sul, 1959

As governor of Rio Grande do Sul (1959–63), Brizola rose to prominence for his social policies that included the quick building of public schools in poor neighborhoods across the state (brizoletas). He supported policies directed towards improving the conditions of small-scale, autonomous farmers and landless rural workers, and the sponsorship of the creation of the corporation MASTER (Rio Grande Landless Rural Workers Movement).

Brizola gained nationwide attention by acting in defense of democracy and Goulart's rights as president. When Jânio Quadros resigned from the presidency in August 1961, the Brazilian military ministers in the Cabinet tried to prevent Vice-President Goulart from becoming president on the grounds of his alleged ties with the Communist movement. After winning support from local army commander general Machado Lopes, Brizola forged the cadeia da legalidade (legality broadcast) from a pool of radio stations in Rio Grande do Sul, which issued a nationwide call from the Piratini Palace denouncing the intentions behind the Cabinet ministers' actions and encouraging common citizens to protest in the streets. Brizola surrendered the State Police Force to the regional army command and began organizing paramilitary Committees of Democratic Resistance, and considered handing out firearms to civilians. After twelve days of impending civil war, the attempted coup failed and Goulart was inaugurated as president.

=== Nationalizations of industrial utilities in Rio Grande and Cold War politics ===
Brizola gained international attention for his nationalist policies; as governor he developed his plan for quick industrialization of the state, a program for the constitution of state-owned industrial utilities, that led him to nationalize American public utilities trusts' assets in Rio Grande, such as ITT and Electric Bond & Share (local branch of American & Foreign Power Company (Amforp for short), itself owned by the holding Electric Bond and Share Company ).

At the time as well as later, many scholars believed such nationalizations to express socialist policy. However, the reason offered by Brizola for the nationalization - in fact almost an expropriation, as the compensation given was of only one monetary unit, pending settlement by a Brazilian court- was simply that both American enterprises, although profiting from previously existing infrastructures, nevertheless supplied limited quantities of utilities at the highest possible rates to final consumers and reinvested a tiny fraction of their profits, the remaining "excess" profits being "repatriated".Therefore, these foreign contractors were considered by Brizola as unreliable for playing a role as tools in a longterm blueprint for industrialization. Earlier, Brizola had offered ITT to participate in a new mixed, state-private ownership telephone company, which would be financed through the selling of new shares to the State of Rio Grande as well as to the general public - in this new company, ITT would remain with a 25% share. As Leacock writes, this proposal probably failed because ITT CEOs didn't want to participate in a joint venture they would not control. That Brizola's avowedly reasons corresponded to his actual goals is supported by a later American scholar, who considers that Brizola's administration, albeit "marred" by these "controversial" nationalizations, was nevertheless "vigorous and constructive". Other American scholar remembers that the same rightist military government that would later exile Brizola found it necessary to nationalize the entire Brazilian telecommunications system in other to develop necessary infrastructures.

Of the two major American contractors involved in Brizola's nationalization, Amforp was far more accommodating; it had been operating at a loss in Brazil and was confident of striking a deal with the Federal government -i.e. Goulart - in order to close its Brazilian operation. ITT had been also operating at a loss; nevertheless, as it had already been taken by surprise by the expropriation of its property in Cuba by Fidel Castro, the nationalization of its Brazilian operation - no matter how unprofitable - was seem by it as something that could set a precedent to the whole of Latin America.Therefore, the fact that ITT decided to enlist for support from Washington

The Brizola nationalizations became headline news in the American press when the John F. Kennedy administration was trying to counter the "Communist infiltration" in Brazil by striking a deal with Goulart that included U.S. financial aid to the Brazilian federal government. In this context, Brizola's actions became a diplomatic embarrassment, which turned Brizola's State government into an intended target of the Hickenlooper Amendment. Goulart gave in to American pressure on the issue, accepting to pay what the Left considered excessive compensations to both ITT & Amforp in exchange for financial aid, Brizola presented his in-law as a defector from the nationalist cause.

Through his domestic and foreign politics, Brizola became a major player in Brazilian politics, eventually developing presidential aspirations he could not legally fulfill at the time; Brazilian law did not allow close relatives of the acting President to stand for the following term of office. Between 1961 and 1964, Brizola acted as the radical wing of the independent left, where he pressured the office for an agenda of radical social and political reforms and for a change in the electoral legislation that allowed for his presidential candidacy in 1965. He was seen as personally authoritarian and quarrelsome, and capable of dealing with his enemies using physical aggression; for example he hit rightwing journalist David Nasser at Rio de Janeiro airport. Brizola acted as an adventurer in the political game around the Goulart government, being feared and hated by the political moderate Left and Right. This role was especially visible when Brizola moved his constituency from Rio Grande do Sul to a national political center, winning a landslide victory (269,384 ballots or a quarter of the State's electorate) in the 1962 election to Congress as a representative for the State of Guanabara—the Rio de Janeiro municipality reorganized as a city-state after the national capital had been moved to Brasilia. A layer of lore quickly developed around Brizola's efforts to "steal" his brother-in-law's Goulart "political thunder".

=== Radical leadership and friction with Goulart (1963–1964) ===
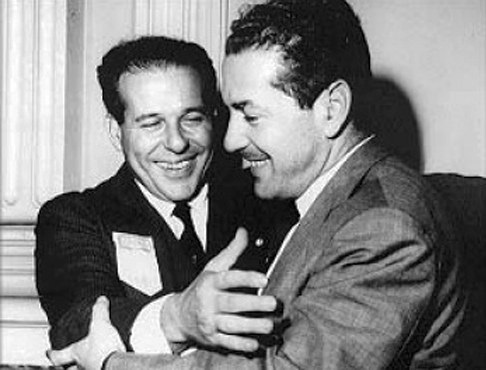
Brizola (right) with his brother-in-law President João Goulart in the early 1960s.

Goulart had been sworn as President in 1961 by means of a compromise, in which he was head of State in a parliamentary system. On 6 January 1963, however, a plebiscite scheduled earlier restored Goulart to the position of head of government and extinguished the cabinet. At the same time, in a move to vye with Goulart for political leadership, Brizola started a weekly Friday talkshow on the Rio radio broadcast Mayrink Veiga that was owned by Congressman from São Paulo State Miguel Leuzzi, which he used to broadcast nationwide, and planned to constitute a network of political cells composed of small groups of armed men; the "elevensome" Grupos de Onze—paramilitary parties modeled on a soccer team. These were supposed to act as grassroots organizations that would "defend and diffuse" the chief points of a reformist agenda that would have to be achieved "by hook or by crook" (na lei ou na marra). Brizola's using of metaphors from the world of soccer was one of the instances of his apt rhetoric, that rendered him at the time a master of the broadcasts. So apt, actually, as to make the whole of contemporary political specter to fear his bid at preeminence: in the words of a contemporary journalist, "Brizola was willing to pay any price to retain the ball" (ser o dono da bola).

Brizola's posturing and rhetoric seemed to justify the classification developed by Goulart's Foreign Minister and leader of the moderate left, San Tiago Dantas: Brizola was a paragon of a "negative left" which, in its uncompromising, ideological defense of social reform, forsook any compromise with democratic institutions. Dantas' aversion to Brizola was reciprocated: Dantas and Goulart's War Minister General Amaury Kruel and Commerce Minister Antônio Balbino formed an "anti-reformist tripod" of "traitors to the national interests". Dantas, who negotiated the 1963 U.S.-Brazil financial agreement, had been received in Washington "more like a head of state than a minister of finance", and expected to be greeted at his homecoming "with appreciation if not fanfare"; a hope Brizola quickly dashed with "venomous attacks".

Notwithstanding his alleged radicalism, Brizola was not an ideologue or doctrinaire. Generally, he stood for an extreme Left Nationalism; land reform, extension of the franchise for illiterates and NCOs; and for tight controls over foreign investment that caused the American ambassador to Brazil, Lincoln Gordon, to dislike Brizola and compare his propaganda techniques with those of Joseph Goebbels; a mood mirrored by most of contemporary American media. Many contemporary American intellectuals also disliked Brizola; John dos Passos said Brizola tried to "starve" Rio de Janeiro by retaining rice consignments from Rio Grande do Sul during his governorship.

In late 1963, after the failure of a conservative plan of economic adjustment (Plano Trienal) devised by the Ministry of Planning Celso Furtado, Brizola involved himself in a bid for power by toppling Goulart's economically conservative Minister of Finance Carvalho Pinto to take the post himself. Brizola wanted to foster his radical agenda, saying, "if we want to make a revolution, we must have the key to the safe". Brizola's bid for the Ministry failed; the post was given to an unpolitical Banco do Brasil CEO. This helped radicalize contemporaneous Brazilian political life; the country's most politically conservative newspaper O Globo said it was as though "the task of putting down the fire fell to the chief arsonist". During late 1963 and early 1964, a division between Brizola and his brother-in-law opened; Brizola became convinced that Goulart intended to stage a coup backed by loyalist military commanders, to stop the ongoing process of political radicalization, and that the only way to pre-empt Goulart's move was a grassroots revolutionary movement.

According to many authors, Brizola's uncompromising radicalism denied his brother-in-law's government the ability to "compromise and conciliate" and to adopt a feasible reformist agenda. According to American scholar Alfred Stepan, Brizola's "rhetoric of resentment" gained Goulart a few supporters, but also many powerful and strategically located foes - as was the case when Brizola, out of a public rostrum, called a commanding general, to his face, a "gorilla". Some say Brizola's reasons for this were egotistical; according to Rose, "Leonel Brizola was concerned only with Leonel Brizola". Other authors say Brizola advocated a reformist agenda centered on concrete issues (land reform, extension of the franchise, foreign capital controls), whose acceptance was regarded as unbearable and indigestible by the ruling classes and their international allies, and whose deployment was foreign to the contemporaneous political system. In a March 1964 State Department telegram sent to the American ambassador in Brazil, U.S. support of the incoming military coup was equated with denying Goulart and Brizola a position of democratic legitimacy that allowed them to adopt their "extremist" plans. Some earlier American policymakers had expressed their repugnance at the prospect of supporting Goulart's agenda of reforms as "an attempt to force the US to finance an inimical regime". According to José Murilo de Carvalho, Brizola's aggressive stance towards the reforming process was more coherent than Goulart's, who supported a reformist agenda but eschewed the necessary use of force to foster it. Goulart's ambivalence towards his in-law did not win him any international support: U.S. Ambassador Lincoln Gordon regarded Goulart as an opportunist who was "mesmerized" by Brizola.

== Exile and return (1964–1979) ==
In April 1964, a coup d'état overthrew Goulart. Brizola was the only political leader to support for the president, sheltering him in Porto Alegre and hoping a bid to rouse the local army units towards the restoration of the toppled régime could be made. Brizola engaged himself in schemes to confront the military putschists, including giving a fiery public speech at the Porto Alegre City Hall, exhorting army NCOs to "occupy barracks and arrest the generals", which earned him the lasting hatred of the dictatorship's military commanders. After an unsuccessful month in Rio Grande, Brizola fled in early May 1964 to Uruguay, where Goulart was already in exile after offering little support to Brizola's attempts at armed resistance.

As a political loner during his early Uruguayan exile, Brizola eventually preferred insurrectionist politics to reformism, and appeared to be a belated revolutionary leader. In early 1965, a group of Brizola's sympathizers—mostly Army NCOs— tried and failed to articulate a theater of guerrilla warfare in the Eastern Brazilian mountains around Caparaó, which was only underground military training that was suppressed without incident. Another group of Brizolista guerrillas dispersed after a shoot-out with the army in Southern Brazil. This event raised suspicions about Brizola's mis-management of funds offered to him by Fidel Castro. Except for this episode, Brizola spent the first ten years of the Brazilian military dictatorship mostly alone in Uruguay, where he managed his wife's landed property and kept abreast of domestic news from various opposition movements in Brazil. He rejected attempts at being recruited into the Frente Ampla (Broad Front), a mid-1960s informal caucus of pre-dictatorship leaders intent on pressuring for re-democratization, which included Carlos Lacerda and Juscelino Kubitschek. Brizola broke the few remaining ties with his brother-in-law and fellow exile, João Goulart, over the attempted recruitment.

=== U.S. rescue from Uruguay, exile in the U.S. and Europe (1977–1979) ===
Since the beginning of his exile, Brizola had been closely watched by Brazilian intelligence, who pressured the Uruguayan government on a regular basis. In the late 1970s, nevertheless, the emergence of a military dictatorship in Uruguay allowed the Brazilian government to work together with the Uruguayan military to seize Brizola as part of Operation Condor, the cooperation between Latin American dictatorships for hounding leftist opponents.

Until the late 1970s, American intelligence had helped the efforts of the Latin American dictatorships to keep a check on Brizola: the 1960s Brazilian ambassador in Uruguay was later outed by Philip Agee as a CIA operative. Brizola may have survived his exile because US Latin American policy had meanwhile changed, with the efforts of the Jimmy Carter administration to curb human rights abuses. This intervention, for which Brizola held a lifelong gratitude to Carter, amounted to a sharp change in Brizola's politics, to the immediate disapproval of his leftist friends: the filmmaker Glauber Rocha said Brizola had made friends with "Carter, the Van Johnson of politics".

Between late 1976 and early 1977, the fact that all three most prominent members of the Frente Ampla - Juscelino Kubitscheck, João Goulart himself and Carlos Lacerda - had all died in succession and in somewhat mysterious circumstances, made Brizola feel increasingly threatened in Uruguay. Faced with impending withdrawal of his asylum, he sought the American Embassy In Uruguay, where he held talks with political counselor John Youle. Youle, over the opposition of Assistant Secretary of State for Western Hemisphere Affairs Terence Todman, granted Brizola a transit visa that allowed Brizola, who in mid-1977 was deported from Uruguay for alleged "violations of norms of political asylum", to travel to—and eventually be given immediate asylum in—the United States.

Brizola's rescue from Uruguay is acknowledged as one of the successes of Carter's Human Rights rhetoric. It was typical of Brizola's political pragmatism and was shunned, again, by Glauber Rocha as "a demonstration of cultural colonization". After his rescue by Carter, Brizola would not directly oppose American policies towards Brazil, contenting himself with denouncing vague "international losses" incurred by Brazil through unfair terms of exchange imposed by multinational corporations.

According to recent declassified Brazilian diplomatic documents, on 20 September 1977, on the way to the U.S., Brizola and his wife went to Buenos Aires, a dangerous place for Latin American exiles. The Brizolas were followed by American CIA agents and stayed overnight in a CIA safe house and boarded a nonstop flight to New York City on 22 September. Shortly after arriving in New York, Brizola met with U.S. Senator Edward Kennedy, who helped gain Brizola permission to stay in the U.S. for six months. From a suite at the Roosevelt Hotel, Brizola profited from his American stay by organizing a network of contacts with Brazilian exiles and American academics interested in ending military rule in Brazil.

Later, Brizola moved to Portugal, where, through Mario Soares, he approached the Socialist International leadership and sided with a Social-Democratic, reformist plan for post-dictatorship Brazil. During his time in the U.S., Brizola was contacted by Afro-Brazilian activist Abdias do Nascimento, and became acquainted with identity politics, which would influence his post-dictatorship career. In a political manifesto launched in Lisbon—the Charter of Lisbon that stated his intention of re-founding a Labor Party in Brazil—Brizola adhered to race politics by stating that Blacks and Native Brazilians suffered from more unjust and painful forms of exploitation than regular class exploitation and needed special measures that addressed their plights. Other identity groups were sought for special attention; Northeastern Brazilians, marginalized children and females in general— which made the intended party appear to be vying for mass appeal rather than a core trade unionist base. That was a break with the usual introspection of Brazilian party politics, although Brizola remained attached to the "quintessentially Brazilian" Vargoist tradition.

In the late 1970s. the Brazilian military dictatorship was waning; in 1978, passports were quietly given to prominent political exiles but Brizola, alongside a core group of alleged radicals described as "public enemy number one", remained blacklisted and was refused the right of return. In 1979, after a general amnesty, his exile came to an end.

== Late Brizolismo (1979–1989) ==
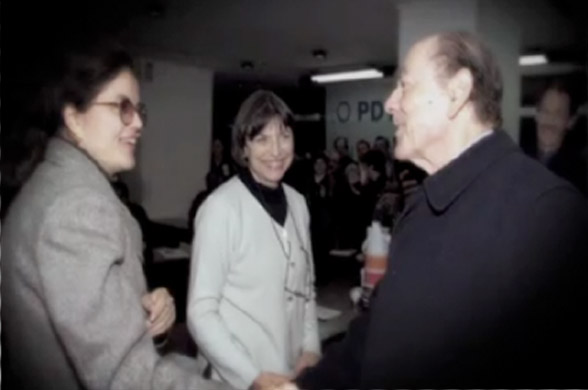
Dilma Rousseff, then a founding member of the Democratic Labour Party, with Brizola.

Brizola returned to Brazil with the intention of restoring the Brazilian Labour Party as a radical, nationalist, left-wing, mass movement and as a confederacy of historical Getulist leaders. He was hampered in this by the emergence of new grassroots movements, such as the new trade unionism centered around the São Paulo metalworkers and their leader Luiz Inácio Lula da Silva, and the Catholic grassroots organizations of the rural poor spawned by the National Conference of Catholic Bishops (CNBB). Brizola was denied the right to use the historical name of the Brazilian Labour Party, previously conceded to a rival group centered around a military dictatorship-friendly figure, Congresswoman Ivete Vargas—the grand-niece of Getúlio Vargas. Instead, Brizola founded an entirely new party, the Democratic Labour Party (Partido Democrático Trabalhista, PDT). The party joined the Socialist International in 1986, and since then the party symbol has been the fist and rose, the emblem of the SI and of a number of its member parties.

Brizola quickly restored his political prominence in Rio Grande do Sul and gained political pre-eminence in the State of Rio de Janeiro, where he sought a new basis of political support. Instead of associating himself with the organized working class—either by means of corporatist trade unionism or by vying with Lula and the WP for the support of the new trade unionism—Brizola sought a basis of support among the unorganized urban poor by means of an ideological tie-in between traditional radical nationalism and a charismatic lumpen-friendly populism, in what one scholar called "the aesthetics of the ugly". For his opponents, Brizola and his Brizolismo stood for shady deals with the "dangerous", resentful, "overrebellious" underclasses; for his supporters, they stood for the paternalistic empowerment of the destitute—the lowest, least organized and poorest of the working classes. According to Sento Sé, "Politics, from a Brizolista viewpoint, is above all to assume a radical option for the poor and the meek".

Brizola shunned the class-based, corporatist character of his early populism and adopted a Christian rhetoric of friendship to the people in general—akin to the Russian narodniks than to classical Latin American populism. This new radical populism was seen as a threat to more orderly, liberal-democratic politics. It suffered from a lacking mastery of less personal mass politics techniques and required Brizola's charismatic and personal leadership of Brizola to function effectively. In Brizola's absence—or that of his persona—the PDT could not become a contender to power, hampering its development on the national level.

In 1982, Brizola stood for governor of the State of Rio de Janeiro in the first free, direct, gubernatorial elections in that state since 1965. He ran a ticket of candidates for Congress that tried to compensate for his party's lack of cadres by offering a roster of people with no previous ties to professional politics, such as the Native Brazilian leader Mário Juruna, the singer Agnaldo Timóteo, and a sizeable number of Afro-Brazilian activists. He was aware that this last foray into race politics contradicted his previous, more conventionally radical policies. Brizola nicknamed his ideology Socialismo Moreno ("Socialism of Color" or "mixed-race socialism"). Brizola centered his personal campaign on issues such as education and public security, offering a candidacy that had clear, oppositional overtones and proposed to upheld the Vargoist legacy. By developing a nucleus of combative militants around himself—the so-called Brizolândia—Brizola led a campaign that melded violent confrontations and street brawls with a paradoxically festive mood, expressed by the motto Brizola na cabeça—a pun between "Brizola at the head of the ticket" and "High on Brizola", brisola being a contemporary slang for a small parcel of cocaine.

To have his victory in the 1982 elections acknowledged, Brizola had to publicly denounce what the paper Jornal do Brasil described as an attempt at fraudulent accounting of the ballots by the private contractor Proconsult—a computer engineering firm owned by former military intelligence operatives—contracted by the electoral court to offer speedy electoral statistics. During the early ballot-counting process, Proconsult repeatedly supplied media with communiqués offering belated voting statistics from rural areas, where Brizola was at a disadvantage, which were immediately echoed by TV Globo. By denouncing this alleged fraud at press conferences, interviews, and public statements—which included a discussion with Globo CEO Armando Nogueira on live television— Brizola pre-empted the scheme of any chance of success, as official ballot numbers eventually gave him the lead.

Brizola then proceeded to keep and expanded his nationwide political visibility during his controversial first term as governor of Rio (1983–1987). He developed his early education policies on a grander scale with an ambitious programme of construction of large high-school buildings, the so-called CIEPs ("Integrated Centers for Public Education") whose architect was Oscar Niemeyer. The schools were intended to be open all day, providing food and recreational activities to students. Brizola also developed policies for providing public services and recognized housing property for dwellers in shanty towns. Brizola opposed policies for shantytowns based on forcible resettlement to housing projects, and instead proposed—in the words of his chief adviser Darcy Ribeiro, that "shanty towns are not part of the problem, but part of the solution" - a "bizarre" solution, but nevertheless one that "allowed shanty people to be near to their working places and live as a regular human community". Therefore, once property rights were acknowledged and basic infrastructure provided, it was up to the shanty town dwellers to find solutions to house-building problems.

Brizola also adopted a radical new policy for police action in the poor suburbs and favelas in the Rio de Janeiro metropolitan area. Alleging old relations and modus operandi were founded on repression, conflict and disrespect, he ordered the state police to refrain from random raids in favelas and repressed the activities of vigilante death squads that included policemen on leave. The right opposed these policies, saying they made slums an open territory for organized crime represented by huge gangs like Comando Vermelho (Red Command), by means of a conflation between common criminality and leftism. It was alleged that gangs had originated through the association of convicted petty criminals and leftist political prisoners in the 1970s. Other scholars argue that this "politicization" of common crime had been the work of the military dictatorship, which, by incarcerating together common criminals and political prisoners, offered the former the opportunity to mimic the organization strategies of underground resistance groups.

Brizola's policies included pork barrel, poor management, personalism, wild spending of public funds, and displaying a tendency at opportunistic, short term solutions. They prepared him for the political gravitas required for running for president in 1989.

Amid the economic crisis and rampant inflation of 1980s Brazil, many conservative observers took Brizola as chief radical bogey—a throwback to 1960s populism. Brizola, as the left in general at the time, sought an accommodation with ruling elites by avoiding taking a firm position on issues such as land reform and nationalization of private banking systems, therefore qualifying for taking power through elections. From the viewpoint of mass electoral politics, it was during the 1989 presidential election Brizola's charismatic leadership exposed its shortcomings when he finished the first run third, losing the second position that would have qualified him for a runoff, by a narrow margin to Luiz Inácio Lula da Silva, whose Workers' Party had the cadres, the professional activism and the penetration of the organized social movements that Brizola's lacked. Fernando Collor de Mello was eventually elected in the runoff. Brizola carried the first-round elections regionally, winning huge majorities in Rio Grande do Sul and in Rio de Janeiro State, but only received 1.4% of the votes from São Paulo state. Lula used his stronghold in the most industrialized areas of the Southeast as a springboard and gathered new voters in the Northeast, where Brizola was practically a no-show candidate. Lula won the right to stand against Collor in the runoff elections, surpassing Brizola by a mere 0.6% of the electorate.

Brizola was a staunch supporter of Lula's candidacy in the 1989 run-off elections, which he justified with a declaration before PDT cronies that became part of Brazilian political lore: "I will be candid: a politician from the old school, Senator Pinheiro Machado once said that politics is the art of swallowing toads (engolir sapo). Wouldn't that be fascinating to force-feed Brazilian élites and having them to swallow the Bearded Toad, Lula?" Brizola's support was crucial in increasing votes for Lula in Rio de Janeiro and Rio Grande do Sul, where Lula passed from a first round 12.2% in Rio de Janeiro and 6.7% in Rio Grande to a second round 72.9% in Rio and 68.7% in Rio Grande.

== Political decline and death (1989–2004) ==
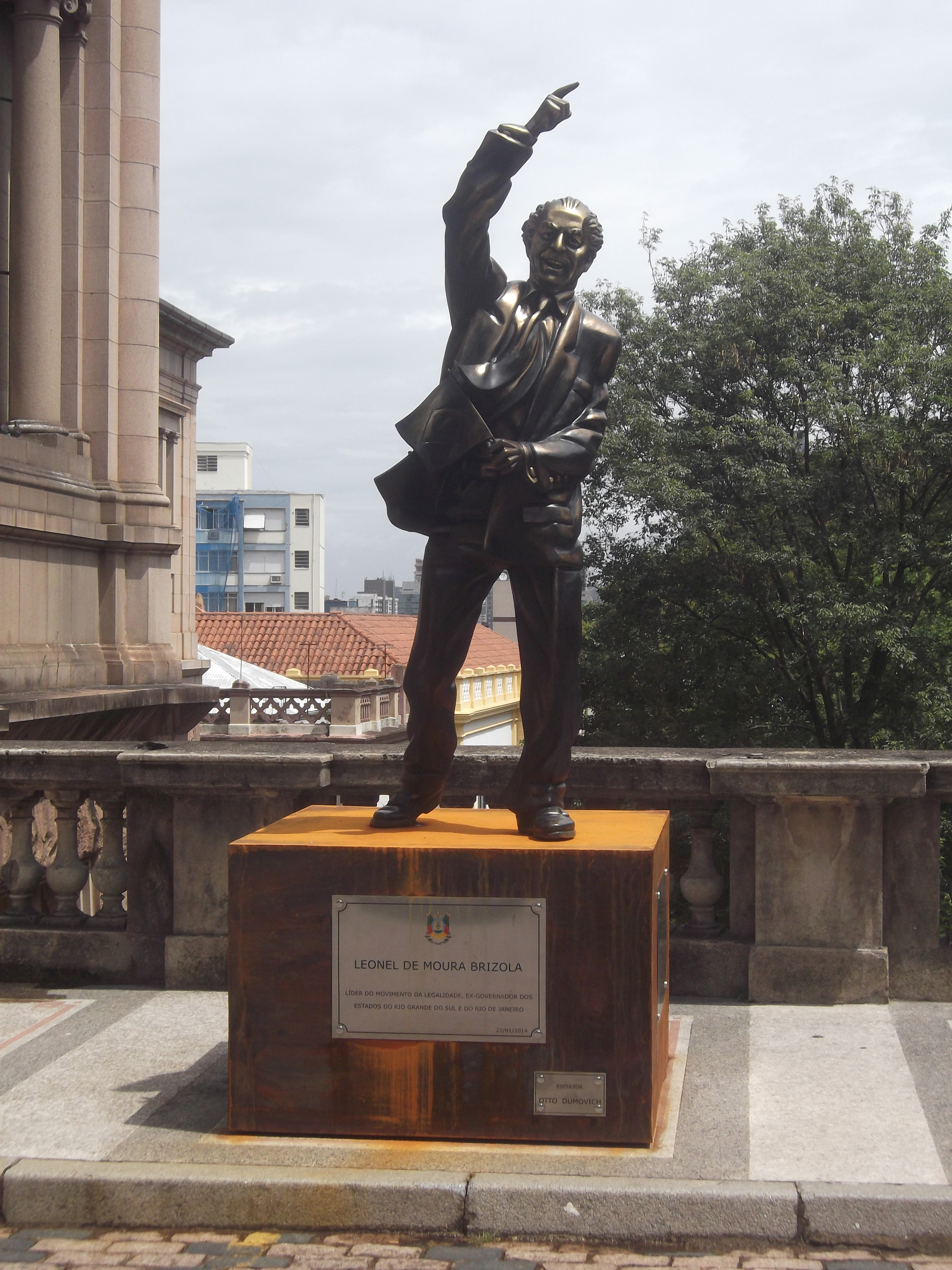
Brizola statue in Porto Alegre.

After the 1989 election there were still chances Brizola could achieve his dream of winning the Presidency if he could overcome his party's lack of national penetration. Some of his advisers proposed him a candidacy to the Senate in the ensuing 1990 elections, which could offer him national highlights. Brizola refused, preferring to present himself as a candidate to the gubernatorial elections in the same year, winning a second term as Governor of Rio de Janeiro by a first-round majority of 60.88% of all valid ballots. Brizola's second term as Rio's governor was a political failure, marked by instances of disorganized management caused by Brizola's ultra-centralism and distaste for proper bureaucratic procedure and the support Brizola eventually offered to the Collor administration in exchange for funds for public works. Brizola was charged with collaborating with the embezzlement schemes that led to Collor's 1992 impeachment.

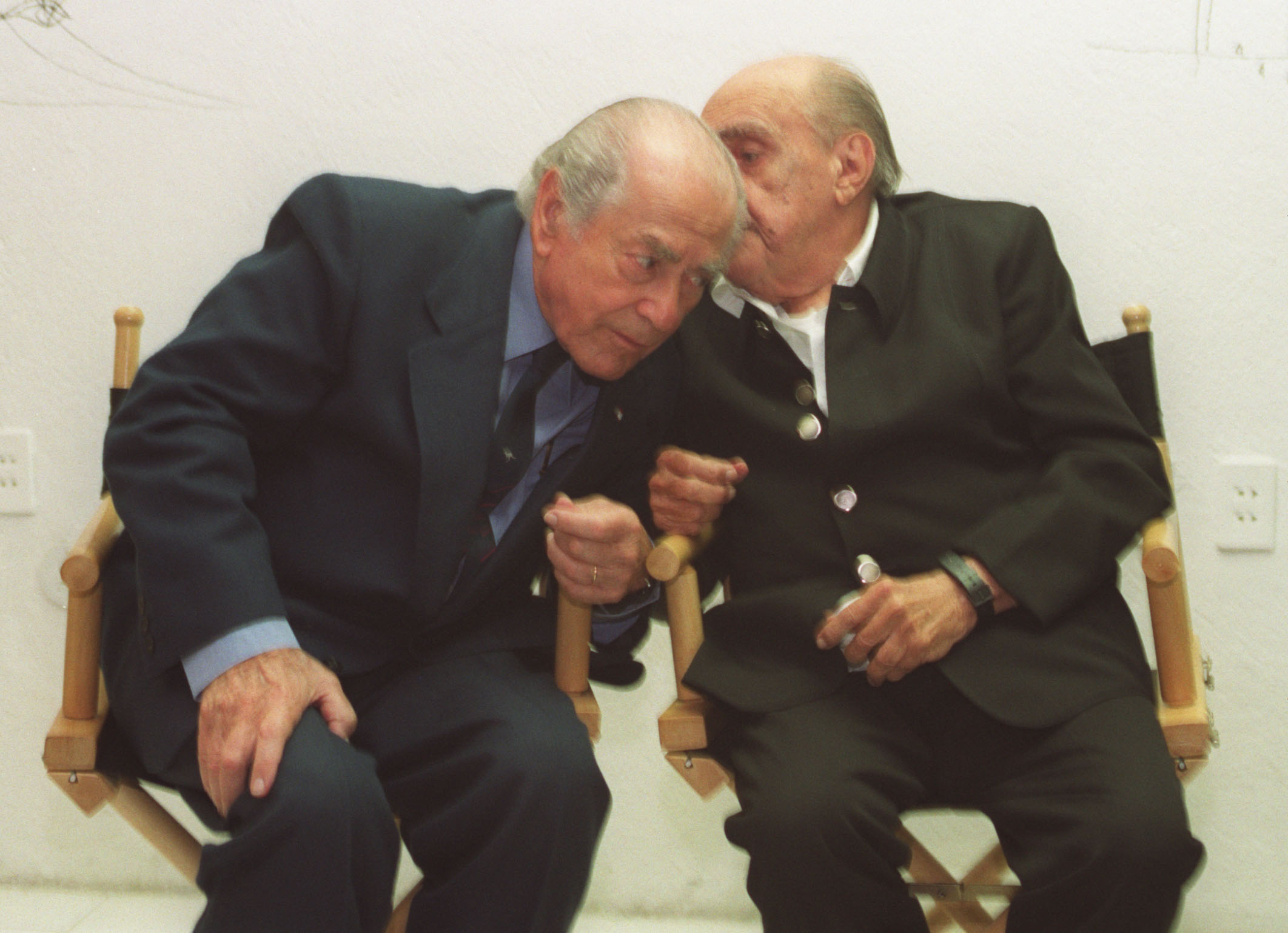
Brizola with architect Oscar Niemeyer in 2002

Bereft of national support and forsaken by close associates such as Cesar Maia and Anthony Garotinho, who abandoned Brizola for the sake of their personal careers, Brizola again ran for president on the PDT's ticket, amid the success of Minister of Finance and presidential candidate Fernando Henrique Cardoso's anti-inflation Plano Real. The 1994 presidential elections were a failure for Brizola, who scored fifth place. Cardoso was elected in the first round by an absolute majority. It was the end of Brizolismo as a national political force; some weeks before the election, a kiosk in downtown Rio de Janeiro where Brizolandia cronies met was demolished by City Hall officers and was never rebuilt. During Cardoso's first term, Brizola remained a critic of his neoliberal policies of privatization of public companies, saying in 1995, "if there is no civil reaction to privatization, there will be a military one". When Cardoso ran for re-election four years later, Brizola contented himself with a vice presidential candidacy on Lula's ticket, and both lost to Cardoso.

In his final years, Brizola's fractured relationship with Lula and the Workers' Party changed; he refused to support them in the first round of the 2002 presidential election, supporting instead the candidacy of Ciro Gomes for president, while contesting a seat in the Senate. Gomes finished third, Lula was elected president, and Brizola lost his bid for the Senate, bringing an end to his regional force. Brizola supported Lula in the second round of the 2002 election, therefore qualifying for joining with other pre-eminent political figures. He came to be regarded as a veteran of leftist popularism and a secondary character in his last two years. Despite supporting Lula at some periods during his first term, at his last public appearances, Brizola criticized him for what he termed neoliberalist policies and for neglecting traditional left-wing and workers' struggles. Brizola's late comments on Lula took on a personal character. During May 2004, he was one of the sources for a Larry Rohter story on Lula's alleged alcoholism; he told a New York Times correspondent about having advised Lula "to get hold of this thing and control it".

Brizola died on 21 June 2004, after a heart attack. He planned to run for the presidency in 2006 and, although ailing, had just received his former associate Anthony Garotinho and his wife Rosinha Garotinho the day before.

On 29 December 2015, a congressional bill was approved by President Dilma Rousseff inscribing Brizola's name in the Book of Heroes of the Motherland, the official registry of all deceased Brazilians "who offered their lives to the Motherland, her defense and building, with exceptional commitment and heroism".

== Electoral history ==
Election	Party	Office	Coalition	Running mate	First round		Second round		Result
Election	Party	Office	Coalition	Running mate	Votes	%	Votes	%	Result
1947 Rio Grande do Sul State Election	PTB	State Deputy	—N/a		3,839	—N/a			Elected
1950 Rio Grande do Sul State Election	PTB	State Deputy	—N/a		16,691	—N/a			Elected
1951 Porto Alegre Mayoral Election	PTB	Mayor	—N/a	Manoel Vargas	40,877	—N/a			Lost
1954 Rio Grande do Sul State Election	PTB	Federal Deputy	—N/a	—N/a	103,003	—N/a			Elected
1955 Porto Alegre Mayoral Election	PTB	Mayor	—N/a	Tristão Sucupira Vianna	65,077	55.14	—N/a		Elected
1958 Rio Grande do Sul State Election	PTB	Governor	—N/a		670,003	57.22	—N/a		Elected
1962 Guanabara State Election	PTB	Federal Deputy	—N/a		269,384	—N/a			Elected
1982 Rio de Janeiro State Election	PDT	Governor	—N/a	Darcy Ribeiro	1,709,180	34.17	—N/a		Elected
1989 Brazil Presidential Election	PDT	President	—N/a	Fernando Lyra	11,167,665	16.51	—N/a		Lost
1990 Rio de Janeiro State Election	PDT	Governor	Povo Unido (PDT, PCdoB, PCB)	Nilo Batista (PDT)	3,521,206	60.88	—N/a		Elected
1994 Brazil Presidential Election	PDT	President	Força do Povo (PDT, PMN)	Darcy Ribeiro (PDT)	2,015,836	3.18	—N/a		Lost
1998 Brazil Presidential Election	PDT	Vice-President	União do Povo Muda Brasil (PT, PDT, PSB, PCdoB, PCB)	Luiz Inácio Lula da Silva (PT)	21,475,211	31.71	—N/a		Lost
2000 Rio de Janeiro Mayoral Election	PDT	Mayor	—N/a	Miro Teixeira	295,123	9.10	—N/a		Lost
2002 Rio de Janeiro State Election	PDT	Senator	Frente Trabalhista do Rio (PDT, PTB e PPS)	—N/a	1,237,488	8.23	—N/a		Lost

Political offices
Preceded by Moreira Franco	55th Governor of Rio de Janeiro; 1991–1994	Succeeded by Nilo Batista
Preceded by Chagas Freitas	53rd Governor of Rio de Janeiro; 1983–1987	Succeeded by Moreira Franco
Preceded by Ildo Meneghetti	23rd Governor of Rio Grande do Sul; 1959–1963	Succeeded by Ildo Meneghetti
Preceded by Martim Aranha	26th Mayor of Porto Alegre; 1956–1958	Succeeded by Tristão Sucupira Viana
Party political offices
New political party	Democratic Labour Party nominee for President of Brazil; 1989, 1994	Succeeded by Cristovam Buarque
