= Juliana Brizola =

Brazilian lawyer and politician (born 1975)

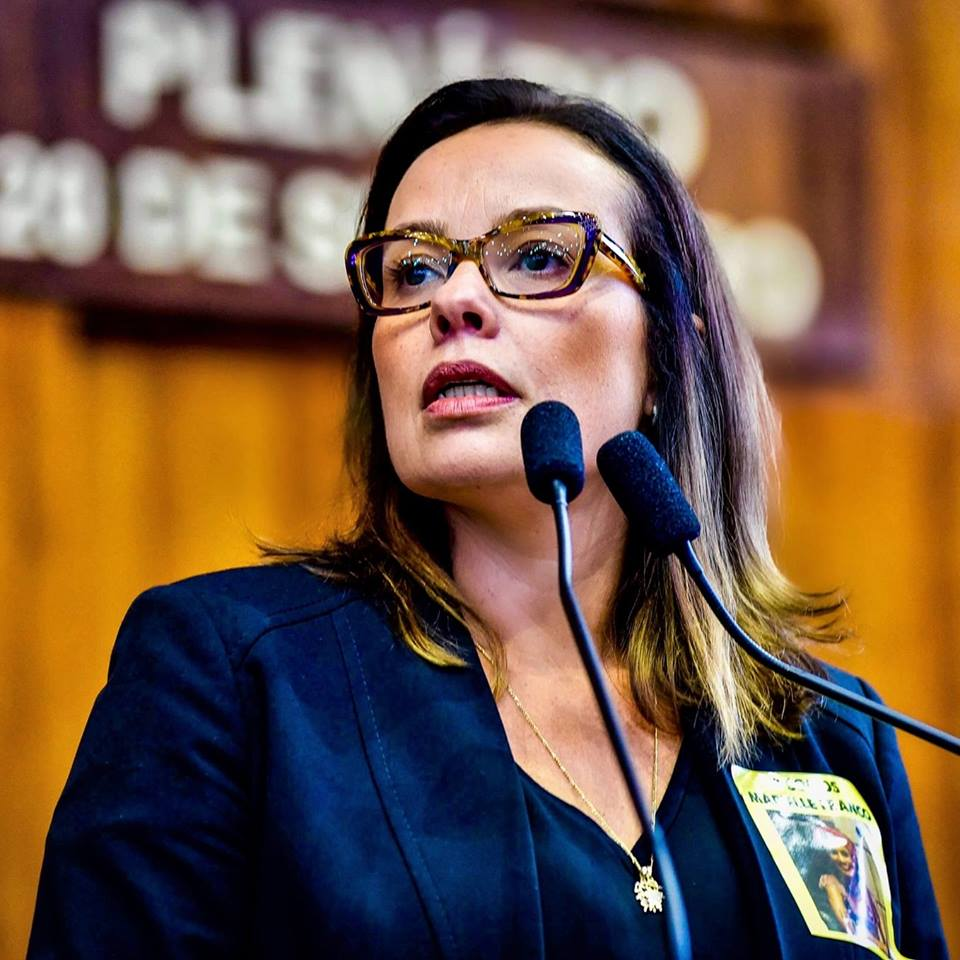
- Juliana Brizola in 2018

State deputy of Rio Grande do Sul
- In office 1 February 2011 – 1 February 2023

Councilwoman of Porto Alegre
- In office 1 January 2009 – 31 December 2011

Personal details
- Born: Juliana Daudt Brizola; 3 August 1975 (age 51) Porto Alegre, Rio Grande do Sul, Brazil
- Party: PDT (1993–present)
- Relatives: Brizola Neto (brother); Leonel Brizola (grandfather); Neusinha Brizola (aunt)
- Education: Universidade Santa Úrsula; Pontifical Catholic University of Rio Grande do Sul

Juliana Daudt Brizola (born 3 August 1975) is a Brazilian lawyer and politician. She was a councilwoman in the city of Porto Alegre from 2009 to 2011 and later became a state deputy in the state of Rio Grande do Sul from 2011 to 2023. She is currently affiliated with the Democratic Labour Party (PDT), which she has been affiliated with since she was 18 years old. She is the granddaughter of Leonel Brizola, as well as the sister of fellow politicians Brizola Neto and Leonel Brizola Neto, being the twin sister of the latter.

== Biography ==
Born in Porto Alegre in 1975, Brizola moved to Uruguay at 3 years old as her grandfather Leonel went into exile during the military dictatorship. On her mother's side, she is the granddaughter of aeronautic captain Alfredo Daudt, who was one of the service members who stopped the take-off of FAB jets that were sent to bomb Piratini Palace during the Legality Campaign.

In 1982, she moved to Rio de Janeiro as Leonel became the governor of the state. Brizola graduated with a law degree from Universidade Santa Úrsula in Rio de Janeiro. After she finished her studies, she returned to Porto Alegre, where she took specialization courses and later mastered in criminal law at the Pontifical Catholic University of Rio Grande do Sul.

In 2008, she became a councilwoman in Porto Alegre as part of the PDT. She was the most voted for candidate from the PDT.

Brizola was elected a state deputy in Rio Grande do Sul in 2010, being elected with 61,305 votes, becoming once again the most voted candidate from her party. During her campaign, she emphasized her plan for governance where she emphasized education, following the policies of her grandfather. During her first term, she passed a law in the state assembly that created a constitutional amendment changing the Escola de Tempo Integral project into a state project.

During the 2014 elections, she became a first substitute of the PDT; However, with the mandate of Diogenes Basegio being revoked by the regional election courts, Brizola became a state deputy once again. She was reelected in 2018 with ~43,000 votes, with the largest percentage of her vote share coming from her grandfather's home city of Carazinho. She later would become the leader of the PDT in the state legislative assembly.

In 2020, she ran to be the mayor of Porto Alegre with a PDT-led coalition. She came in 4th place with 41,407 votes, thus not advancing to the second round. In 2022, she was elected as a first substitute for federal deputy.

== Electoral history ==
Year	Election	Position	Party	Coalition	Votes	%	Results	Notes
2008	Porto Alegre Municipal Elections	Councilwoman	PDT		9,247	1.22%	Won	
2010	Rio Grande do Sul state elections	State Deputy	PDT	PDT, PTN	61,305	0.98%	Won	
2014	Rio Grande do Sul state elections	State Deputy	PDT	PDT, DEM	33,530	0.55%	Substitute	
2016	Porto Alegre Municipal Elections	Vice-mayor	PDT	PMDB, PDT, PSD, PSB, DEM, PRB, PPS, PROS, PTN, REDE, PSDC, PHS, PRTB, PEN, PMN	262,601	39.5	Lost	
2018	Rio Grande do Sul state elections	State deputy	PDT	PDT, PV, PMB	43,822	0.76%	Won	
2020	Porto Alegre Municipal Elections	Mayor	PDT	PDT, PSB, REDE	41,407	6.4%	Lost	
2022	Rio Grande do Sul state elections	Federal deputy	PDT		68,865	1.12%	Substitute	
