= Miguel Coelho =

Brazilian politician (born 1990)

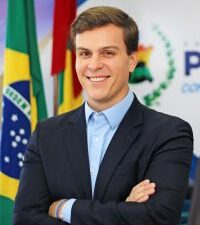
- Coelho in 2021

Mayor of Petrolina
- In office 1 January 2017 – 30 March 2022
- Preceded by: Júlio Lóssio
- Succeeded by: Simão Durando

Personal details
- Born: 18 September 1990 (age 36)
- Party: Brazil Union (since 2022)
- Parent: Fernando Bezerra Coelho (father)
- Relatives: Fernando Coelho Filho (brother); Antônio Coelho (brother)

Miguel de Souza Leão Coelho (born 18 September 1990) is a Brazilian politician. From 2015 to 2016, he was a member of the Legislative Assembly of Pernambuco. From 2017 to 2022, he served as mayor of Petrolina. In the 2022 gubernatorial election, he was a candidate for governor of Pernambuco. He is the son of Fernando Bezerra Coelho and the brother of Fernando Coelho Filho and Antônio Coelho.
