= Francisco Luiz Sibut Gomide =

Brazilian engineer, economist and politician

Minister of Mines and Energy
- In office 3 April 2002 – 31 December 2002
- President: Luiz Inácio Lula da Silva
- Preceded by: José Jorge de Vasconcelos Lima
- Succeeded by: Dilma Rousseff

Personal details
- Born: 30 November 1945 (age 80) Curitiba, Brazil

Francisco Luiz Sibut Gomide (born 30 November 1945 in Curitiba) is an engineer, economist and politician.

He was Minister of Mines and Energy of Brazil during the government of President Fernando Henrique Cardoso, from 3 April to 31 December 2002.
