= Neusinha Brizola =

Brazilian singer-songwriter (1954–2011)

- Born: Neusa Maria Goulart Brizola; November 20, 1954; Porto Alegre, Rio Grande do Sul, Brazil
- Died: April 27, 2011 (aged 56); Rio de Janeiro, Brazil
- Occupation: Singer-songwriter
- Children: 2
- Father: Leonel Brizola
- Relatives: João Goulart (uncle); João Goulart Filho (cousin); Brizola Neto (nephew); Juliana Brizola (niece)

Neusa Maria Goulart Brizola, best known as Neusinha Brizola (November 20, 1954 – April 27, 2011), was a Brazilian singer-songwriter.

== Biography and career ==
She was the daughter of the former governor of Rio Grande do Sul and Rio de Janeiro, Leonel Brizola, and niece of the former president of the Republic, João Goulart.

She was successful in the 1980s by releasing new wave hits, such as the song Mintchura, produced by Paulo Coelho and written in partnership with the composer and guitarist from Rio Grande do Sul, Joe Euthanázia, who died in 1989 in a car accident. In 1983, she did a photo shoot for Playboy Magazine, even against the opinion of her father, then governor of the state of Rio de Janeiro, who prevented the publication of the photos.

Her first LP was released this year. In 1984, she participated in the soundtrack of the children's musical program Plunct, Pact, Zuuum, on TV Globo, for which he also composed some soundtracks for soap operas, such as Transas and Caretas, and for the cinema, in films such as As Sete Vampiras. In the Diretas Já campaign, she released the song Diretcha, in a single compact.

Without reaching the same level of success after Mintchura, she is considered a one-hit wonder.

She died at the age of 56 from pulmonary complications resulting from hepatitis.

In 2014, the biography Neusinha Brizola – Sem Mintchura (Neusinha Brizola – Without Mintchura) was released by Editora Interface Olympus, written by journalist Lucas Nobre and writer Fábio Fabrício Fabretti, with the authorization and help of the biographer herself.
