= Fernando Coelho Filho =

Brazilian politician

Fernando Coelho Filho GCRB
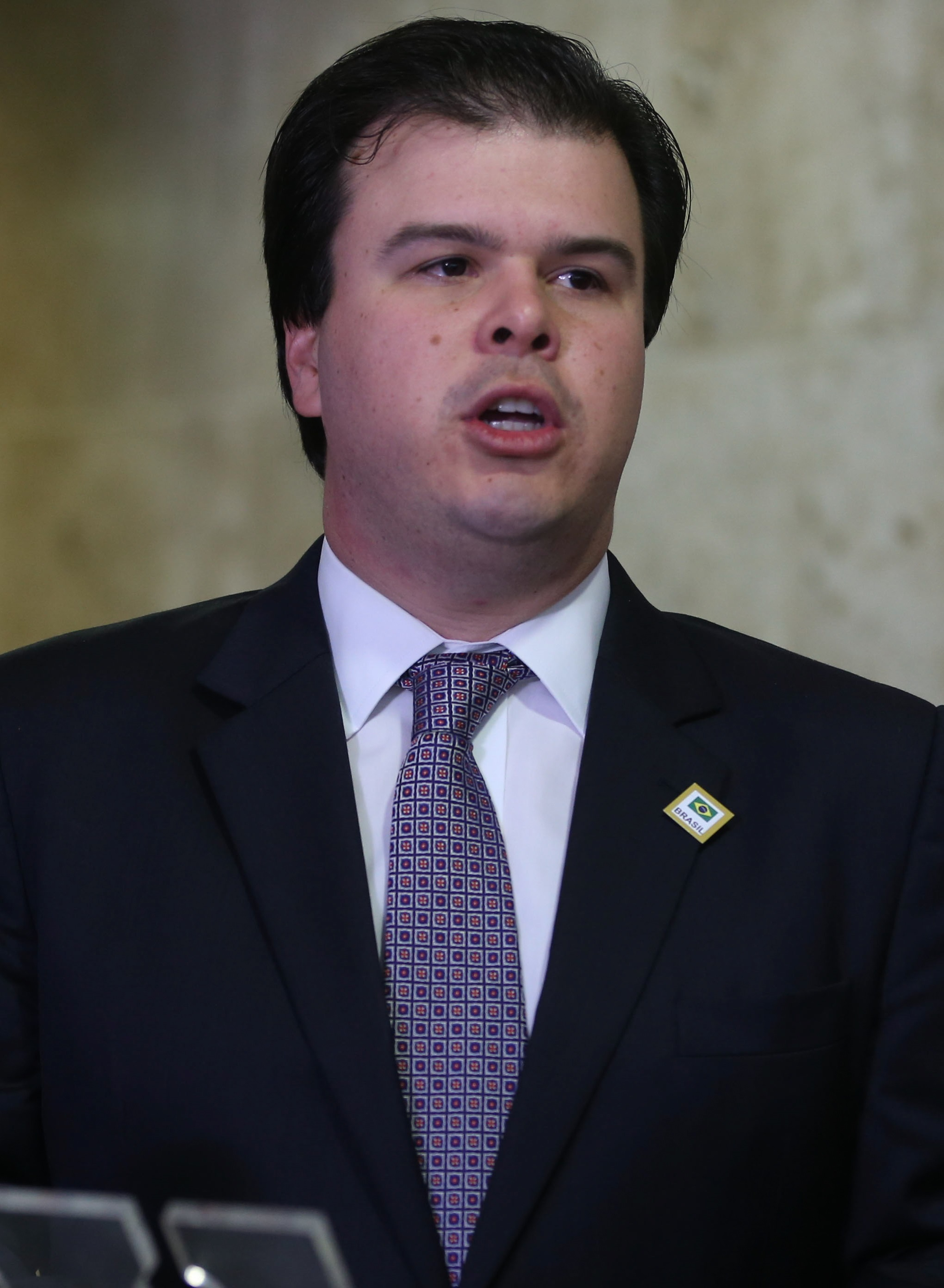

Member of the Chamber of Deputies
- Incumbent
- Assumed office 1 February 2007
- Constituency: Pernambuco

Minister of Mines and Energy
- In office 12 May 2016 – 6 April 2018
- President: Michel Temer
- Preceded by: Marco Antônio Almeida
- Succeeded by: Moreira Franco

Personal details
- Born: Fernando Bezerra de Sousa Coelho Filho; 28 February 1984 (age 42) Recife, Pernambuco, Brazil
- Party: UNIÃO (2022–present)
- Other political affiliations: PSB (2006–2017); MDB (2017–2018); DEM (2018–2022)
- Parent: Fernando Bezerra Coelho (father)
- Relatives: Miguel Coelho (brother); Antônio Coelho (brother)

Fernando Bezerra de Sousa Coelho Filho (born 28 February 1984 in Recife) is a Brazilian company administrator and politician formerly affiliated to Brazil Union (UNIÃO).

== Personal life ==
Son of senator Fernando Bezerra Coelho and Adriana Coelho.

== Career ==
He was the youngest federal deputy elected by the state of Pernambuco in the 2006 election. He had served as minister of Mines and Energy of Brazil, appointed by president Michel Temer on 12 May 2016.

Political offices
Preceded by Marco Antônio Almeida	Minister of Mines and Energy; 2016–2018	Succeeded by Moreira Franco
