= Alexandre Silveira =

Brazilian politician

Minister of Mines and Energy
- Incumbent
- Assumed office 1 January 2023
- President: Luiz Inácio Lula da Silva
- Preceded by: Adolfo Sachsida

Senator for Minas Gerais
- In office 3 February 2022 – 1 January 2023

Member of the Chamber of Deputies for Minas Gerais
- In office 1 February 2007 – 1 February 2015
- Constituency: At-large

Personal details
- Born: 15 July 1970 (age 56) Belo Horizonte, Minas Gerais, Brazil
- Party: PSD (2011–present)
- Other political affiliations: PL (1999–2005); PPS (2005–11)

Alexandre Silveira de Oliveira (born 15 July 1970) is a former police chief, businessman and Brazilian politician, affiliated with the Social Democratic Party (PSD). He was a senator for Minas Gerais.

== Political career ==
In 2003, Alexandre Silveira was invited by the then vice president of Brazil, José Alencar, to occupy the position of general coordinator of the 6th Terrestrial Infrastructure Unit (Unit), a body linked to the National Department of Transport Infrastructure (DNIT). In 2004, he assumed the general directorate of DNIT, remaining in that position until December 2005.

He was a federal deputy in the Legislature from 2007 to 2011, elected by the Popular Socialist Party (PPS). He was re-elected federal deputy by the PSD for the 2011–2014 term. In January 2011, Alexandre Silveira took over the Extraordinary Secretariat for Metropolitan Management in Minas Gerais. He was also Secretary of State for Health in 2014.

Also in 2014, he was elected first substitute for former governor Antonio Anastasia. He became a senator in 2022, with the resignation of Anastasia to assume the post of minister of the Federal Court of Accounts (TCU). He ran for an election in his own right in 2022, but lost to Cleitinho Azevedo.

He is now Minister of Mines and Energy. In July 2026, Minister Silveira announced a major overhaul of federal natural gas marketing policy, projecting a drop in industrial gas prices from $12–$14/mmBtu down to roughly $5/mmBtu to bolster manufacturing and reindustrialization. The move comes in response to concerns that high natural gas prices have hurt industrial competitiveness.

Political offices
Preceded by Adolfo Sachsida	Minister of Mines and Energy; 2023–present	Incumbent
