= Ministry of Mines and Energy (Brazil) =

Brazilian government ministry

- Portuguese: Ministério de Minas e Energia
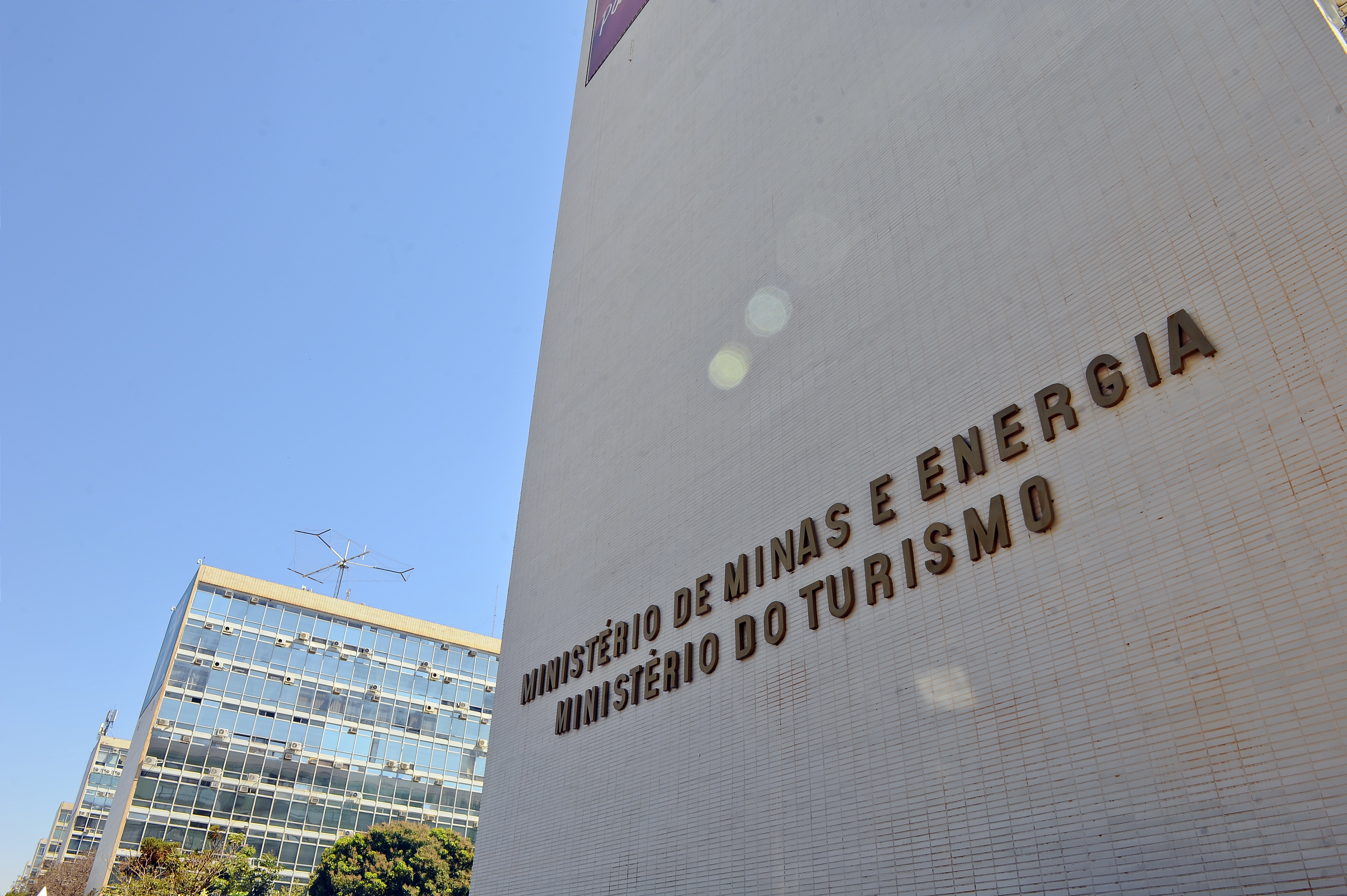
- Facade of the Ministry of Mines and Energy

Ministry overview
- Formed: 22 July 1960; 65 years ago
- Type: Ministry
- Jurisdiction: Federal government of Brazil
- Headquarters: Esplanada dos Ministérios, Bloco U Brasília, Federal District
- Annual budget: R$ 2.8 billion (2023)
- Ministry executives: Alexandre Silveira, Minister; Arthur Valerio, Executive-Secretary; Thiago Barral, Secretary of Energy Transition and Planning; Gentil de Sá Júnior, Secretary of Electric Energy; Pietro Sampaio Mendes, Secretary of Oil, Natural Gas and Biofuels; Vitor Saback, Secretary of Geology, Mining and Mineral Transformation
- Website: www.gov.br/mme/

The Ministry of Mines and Energy (Portuguese: Ministério de Minas e Energia, MME) is a Brazilian government ministry established in 1960. It fosters investments in mining and energy-related activities, funds research and sets out government policies. Previously, mines and energy were the responsibility of the Ministry of Agriculture. As of 1 January 2023, the minister of mines and energy is Alexandre Silveira.

== List of ministers ==
No.	Portrait	Minister	Took office	Left office	Time in office	Party	President/Prime Minister
1	João Agripino Filho	João Agripino Filho (1914–1988)	2 February 1961	28 August 1961	207 days	UDN	Jânio Quadros (PTN)
2	Gabriel Passos	Gabriel Passos (1901–1962)	11 September 1961	18 June 1962	280 days	UDN	Tancredo Neves (PSD)
3	João Mangabeira	João Mangabeira (1880–1964)	27 July 1962	18 September 1962	53 days	PSB	Tancredo Neves (PSD); Brochado da Rocha (PSD)
4	Eliezer Batista	Eliezer Batista (1924–2018)	18 September 1962	20 October 1962	32 days	Independent	Hermes Lima (PTB)
5	Antônio Ferreira de Oliveira Brito	Antônio Ferreira de Oliveira Brito (1908–1997)	18 June 1963	4 April 1964	291 days	PSD	João Goulart (PTB)
6	Artur da Costa e Silva	Artur da Costa e Silva (1899–1969)	4 April 1964	17 April 1964	13 days	Military dictatorship in Brazil	Ranieri Mazzilli (PSD)
7	Mauro Thibau	Mauro Thibau (1923–2005)	17 April 1964	15 March 1967	2 years, 332 days	Independent	Castelo Branco (ARENA)
8	José Costa Cavalcanti	José Costa Cavalcanti (1918–1991)	15 March 1967	27 January 1969	1 year, 318 days	ARENA	Artur da Costa e Silva (ARENA)
9	Antônio Dias Leite Júnior	Antônio Dias Leite Júnior (1920–2017)	27 January 1969	15 March 1974	5 years, 47 days	Independent	Artur da Costa e Silva (ARENA); Military Junta of 1969; Emílio Garrastazu Médici (ARENA)
10	Shigeaki Ueki	Shigeaki Ueki (born 1935)	15 March 1974	15 March 1979	5 years, 0 days	Independent	Ernesto Geisel (ARENA)
11	César Cals	César Cals (1926–1991)	15 March 1979	15 March 1985	6 years, 0 days	PDS	João Figueiredo (PDS)
12	Aureliano Chaves	Aureliano Chaves (1929–2003)	15 March 1985	22 December 1988	3 years, 282 days	PFL	José Sarney (MDB)
–	Iris Rezende	Iris Rezende (1933–2021); Acting	22 December 1988	17 January 1989	26 days	MDB	José Sarney (MDB)
13	Vicente Fialho	Vicente Fialho (1938–2022)	17 January 1989	15 March 1990	1 year, 57 days	PFL	José Sarney (MDB)
14	Pratini de Moraes	Pratini de Moraes (born 1939)	13 April 1992	8 October 1992	178 days	PPR	Fernando Collor (PRN)
15	Paulino de Vasconcellos	Paulino de Vasconcellos (born 1937)	8 October 1992	28 December 1993	1 year, 81 days	PFL	Itamar Franco (MDB)
–	José Israel Vargas	José Israel Vargas (1928–2025); Acting	28 December 1993	3 March 1994	65 days	Independent	Itamar Franco (MDB)
16	Alexis Stepanenko	Alexis Stepanenko (1938–2024)	3 March 1994	20 September 1994	31 years, 152 days	Independent	Itamar Franco (MDB)
–	Delcídio do Amaral	Delcídio do Amaral (born 1955); Acting	20 September 1994	1 January 1995	103 days	PSDB	Itamar Franco (MDB)
17	Raimundo Mendes de Brito	Raimundo Mendes de Brito (born 1948)	1 January 1995	1 January 1999	4 years, 0 days	Independent	Fernando Henrique Cardoso (PSDB)
18	Rodolpho Tourinho Neto	Rodolpho Tourinho Neto (1941–2015)	1 January 1999	22 February 2001	2 years, 52 days	PFL	Fernando Henrique Cardoso (PSDB)
–	Hélio Ramos Filho	Hélio Ramos Filho (born 1959); Acting	22 February 2001	13 March 2001	19 days	Independent	Fernando Henrique Cardoso (PSDB)
19	José Jorge	José Jorge (born 1944)	13 March 2001	8 March 2002	360 days	PFL	Fernando Henrique Cardoso (PSDB)
–	Pedro Parente	Pedro Parente (born 1953); Acting	8 March 2002	3 April 2002	26 days	Independent	Fernando Henrique Cardoso (PSDB)
20	Francisco Gomide	Francisco Gomide (born 1945)	3 April 2002	1 January 2003	273 days	Independent	Fernando Henrique Cardoso (PSDB)
21	Dilma Rousseff	Dilma Rousseff (born 1947)	1 January 2003	21 June 2005	2 years, 171 days	PT	Luiz Inácio Lula da Silva (PT)
–	Mauricio Tolmasquim	Mauricio Tolmasquim; Acting	21 June 2005	8 July 2005	17 days	Independent	Luiz Inácio Lula da Silva (PT)
22	Silas Rondeau	Silas Rondeau (born 1952)	8 July 2005	24 May 2007	1 year, 320 days	Independent	Luiz Inácio Lula da Silva (PT)
–	Nelson Hubner	Nelson Hubner (born 1954); Acting	24 May 2007	21 January 2008	242 days	Independent	Luiz Inácio Lula da Silva (PT)
23	Edison Lobão	Edison Lobão (born 1936)	21 January 2008	31 March 2010	2 years, 69 days	MDB	Luiz Inácio Lula da Silva (PT)
24	Márcio Zimmermann	Márcio Zimmermann (born 1956)	31 March 2010	1 January 2011	276 days	MDB	Luiz Inácio Lula da Silva (PT)
25	Edison Lobão	Edison Lobão (born 1936)	1 January 2011	1 January 2015	4 years, 0 days	MDB	Dilma Rousseff (PT)
26	Eduardo Braga	Eduardo Braga (born 1960)	1 January 2015	20 April 2016	1 year, 110 days	MDB	Dilma Rousseff (PT)
27	Marco Antônio Almeida	Marco Antônio Almeida (born 1961)	20 April 2016	12 May 2016	22 days	Independent	Dilma Rousseff (PT)
28	Fernando Coelho Filho	Fernando Coelho Filho (born 1984)	12 May 2016	6 April 2018	1 year, 329 days	PSB	Michel Temer (MDB)
29	Moreira Franco	Moreira Franco (born 1944)	6 April 2018	1 January 2019	270 days	MDB	Michel Temer (MDB)
30	Bento Costa Lima	Bento Costa Lima (born 1958)	1 January 2019	11 May 2022	3 years, 130 days	Independent	Jair Bolsonaro (PL)
31	Adolfo Sachsida	Adolfo Sachsida (born 1972)	11 May 2022	1 January 2023	235 days	Independent	Jair Bolsonaro (PL)
32	Alexandre Silveira	Alexandre Silveira (born 1970)	1 January 2023	Incumbent	3 years, 49 days	PSD	Luiz Inácio Lula da Silva (PT)
