= 1969 in Brazil =

Events in the year 1969 in Brazil.

== Incumbents ==
=== Federal government ===
- President:
  - Marshal Artur da Costa e Silva (until 31 August)
  - Pedro Aleixo (from 31 August to 30 October, de jure)
  - Admiral Augusto Rademaker, General Aurélio de Lira Tavares and General Márcio Melo (from 31 August to 30 October, de facto)
  - General Emílio Garrastazu Médici (starting 30 October)
- Vice President:
  - Pedro Aleixo (until 31 August)
  - Vacant (from 31 August to October)
  - General Augusto Rademaker (from October 30)

=== Governors ===
- Acre: Vacant
- Alagoas: Antônio Simeão de Lamenha Filho
- Amazonas: Danilo Duarte de Matos Areosa
- Bahia: Luís Viana Filho
- Ceará: Plácido Castelo
- Espírito Santo: Cristiano Dias Lopes Filho
- Goiás: Otávio Lage
- Guanabara: Francisco Negrão de Lima
- Maranhão: José Sarney
- Mato Grosso: Pedro Pedrossian
- Minas Gerais: Israel Pinheiro da Silva
- Pará: Alacid Nunes
- Paraíba: João Agripino Maia
- Paraná: Pablo Cruz Pimentel
- Pernambuco: Nilo Coelho
- Piauí: Helvídio Nunes
- Rio de Janeiro: Geremias de Mattos Fontes
- Rio Grande do Norte: Walfredo Gurgel Dantas
- Rio Grande do Sul: Walter Peracchi Barcelos
- Santa Catarina: Ivo Silveira
- São Paulo: Roberto Costa de Abreu Sodré
- Sergipe: Lourival Baptista

=== Vice governors ===
- Alagoas: Manoel Sampaio Luz
- Amazonas:
  - Rui Arajuo (until 26 July)
  - Vacant thereafter (from 26 July)
- Bahia: Jutahy Magalhães
- Ceará: Humberto Ellery
- Espírito Santo: Isaac Lopes Rubim
- Goiás: Osires Teixeira
- Maranhão: Antonio Jorge Dino
- Mato Grosso: Lenine de Campos Póvoas
- Minas Gerais: Pio Soares Canedo
- Pará: João Renato Franco
- Paraíba: Antônio Juarez Farias
- Paraná: Plínio Franco Ferreira da Costa
- Pernambuco: Salviano Machado Filho
- Piauí: João Clímaco d'Almeida
- Rio de Janeiro: Heli Ribeiro Gomes
- Rio Grande do Norte: Clóvis Motta
- Santa Catarina: Jorge Bornhausen
- São Paulo: Hilário Torloni
- Sergipe: Vacant

== Events ==
=== February ===
- February 26: President Artur da Costa e Silva issues AI-7, which suspends elections for governors and mayors.

=== March ===
- March 20: The Brazilian Company of Posts and Telegraphs (ECT) is founded; a public company that replaces the Department of Posts and Telegraphs (DCT).

=== April ===
- 16 April: Mobster Castor de Andrade is arrested for the second time.

=== May ===
- Unknown Date: Castor de Andrade is released in the beginning of the month, after being detained on Ilha das Flores. This is the last time he's detained by the military regime.

=== August ===
- 16 August: Embraer is founded as an aerospace technology company to manufacture both civil and military aircraft.
- 31 August: A military junta rules the country following the sudden illness of President Artur da Costa e Silva. The junta is made up of ministers Aurélio de Lira Tavares from the Army, Augusto Rademaker from the Navy, and Márcio de Sousa e Melo from the Air Force.

=== September ===
- September 1: The newscast Jornal Nacional on Rede Globo de Televisão premieres.
- September 4: The US Ambassador to Brazil, Charles Burke Elbrick, is kidnapped by two armed members of the revolutionary group MR-8 and the ALN, in Rio de Janeiro.
- September 7: US Ambassador to Brazil Charles Burke Elbrick is freed by armed members of the revolutionary group MR-8 in Rio de Janeiro.
- September 18: In Rio de Janeiro, the Provisional Governing Board signs a decree-law, establishing the new National Security Law.

=== October ===
- October 15: The three military ministers sign the Complementary Acts in Rio de Janeiro, which order the reopening of the National Congress of Brazil.
- October 17: The military junta promulgates Constitutional Amendment n°1, known as the 1969 Constitution.
- October 25: ARENA candidate Emílio Garrastazu Médici is elected President of Brazil by a joint session of Congress, specially reopened by AI-16.
- October 30: Emílio Garrastazu Médici takes office as the 28th president of Brazil.

=== November ===
- November 4: Ação Libertadora Nacional leader Carlos Marighella is shot to death by DOPS agents in São Paulo.
- November 19: Pelé scores his 1,000th goal for Santos, beating Vasco da Gama 2–1 at the Maracanã Stadium.

== Births ==
=== January ===
- 16 January: Daniela Escobar, actress and television presenter

=== April ===
- 30 April: Paulo Jr., bassist

=== June ===
- 30 June: Dira Paes, actress

=== July ===
- 25 July: David Brazil, promoter and actor

=== September ===
- 5 September: Leonardo, footballer
- 18 September: Gralak, footballer
- 26 September: Dan Stulbach, actor, television presenter, director and artistic director

=== November ===
- 11 November: Bismarck Barreto Faria, footballer

=== December ===
- 5 December: Jean Elias, footballer

== Deaths ==
=== March ===
- 12 March: Adhemar de Barros, politician

=== July ===
- 10 July: João de Souza Mendes, chess master

=== September ===
- 6 September: Arthur Friedenreich, soccer player

=== November ===
- 4 November: Carlos Marighella, Marxist revolutionary and writer
- 7 November: Cyro de Freitas Valle, lawyer

=== December ===
- 17 December: Artur da Costa e Silva, former president, heart attack

== See also ==
- 1969 in Brazilian football
- 1969 in Brazilian television
