= Presidency of Emílio Médici =

Brazilian governmental presidency (1969–1974)

- Presidency of Emílio Médici; 30 October 1969 – 15 March 1974
- Vice President: Augusto Rademaker
- Party: ARENA
- Election: 1969
- Standard of the President

The presidency of Emílio Médici began on 30 October 1969, after General Emílio Garrastazu Médici won the 1969 presidential election, and ended on January 31, 1974, when Ernesto Geisel took office.

Emílio Médici was the third president of Brazil's military dictatorship. His administration was marked by the Brazilian Miracle, the armed struggle against the military dictatorship, the Araguaia Guerrilla War and development projects such as POLAMAZÔNIA, PRORURAL, POLONORDESTE and the Rondon Project. During his term, Brazil's GDP grew by an average of 11.9%, the highest growth rate of the Republican era.

== 1969 Brazilian election ==
Inauguration ceremony of President Emílio Médici in 1969.

The National Congress had been closed since Institutional Act Number Five was issued on 13 December 1968. Médici demanded that the National Congress be reopened for his inauguration as president, and on 25 October 1969, he was chosen as president of the republic in a joint session, obtaining 293 votes.

=== Investiture of Emílio Médici ===
Médici assumed office on 30 October 1969, with the promise of re-establishing democracy by the end of his term, which did not happen. Unlike previous presidents and his successor, Geisel, he did not revoke the electoral mandate of any politician. Delfim Neto, his Minister of Finance, told IstoÉ magazine:

When Geisel was elected, his problem basically was: "What are they going to say about me if I run a government that's worse than Médici's?". He always had to say that Médici was the executioner. But Médici never closed Congress, he never dismissed a member of parliament, which Geisel did at will.

== Internal policy ==
=== Elections ===
In the two elections that were held during the Médici government, ARENA, the party that supported the military dictatorship, was largely victorious, winning 19 senators against 3 for the MDB in 1970, and almost all the mayors and councillors in Brazil in 1972. The three most important ministers in his government were Delfim Neto, who was in charge of the economy, João Leitão de Abreu, the political coordinator, and Orlando Geisel, responsible for combating subversion.

=== Economy ===
Médici's presidential inauguration on 30 October 1969

His government was marked by economic growth during the Brazilian Miracle and the rise of the lower and middle classes. Consumption of durable goods and the production of automobiles increased greatly. In 1972, color television began operating in Brazil. Record economic growth, low inflation and development projects such as the Programa de Integração Nacional (English: National Integration Program - PIN), which allowed for the construction of the Santarém-Cuiabá, Perimetral Norte, Trans-Amazonian highways and the Rio-Niterói Bridge, as well as major tax incentives for industry and agriculture, were the most notable aspects of the period.

Popular housing was also built at this time through the Banco Nacional da Habitação. During his administration, an agreement was reached with Paraguay for the construction of the Itaipu Dam. The $3 billion cost of the project would be assumed entirely by Brazil through financing, while Paraguay's share would be paid for by exporting electricity to Brazil.

=== Advertising and press freedom ===
Médici governed under the 1967 Constitution, which had been modified by the 1969 military junta a few months before his inauguration to become more repressive. His administration used torture and restricted censorship of the press. Importation of the men's magazines Playboy, Penthouse and Lui, as well as the German news magazine Der Spiegel, were banned because they offended "morals and proper behavior".

The Médici government spent millions of cruzeiros on propaganda to encourage patriotism in support of the military dictatorship and created the slogan Brasil, ame-o ou deixe-o ("Brazil, love it or leave it"). In 1969, when the National Congress was reopened by order of Médici, the government leader, Daniel Krieger, resigned and was replaced by Senator Filinto Müller, a former participant and deserter from the Prestes Column, former police chief of Rio de Janeiro during the Estado Novo (responsible for arresting Olga Benário Prestes on orders from Getúlio Vargas) and former leader of the PSD in the Senate during the Juscelino Kubitschek government.

=== Social policy ===
The Médici government created the PIS/PASEP and the Programa de Assistência Rural (English: Rural Assistance Program - PRORURAL), linked to FUNRURAL, which provided retirement benefits and increased health services, formerly scarce for rural workers. It also established the Movimento Brasileiro de Alfabetização (Brazilian Moviment of Literation - MOBRAL), designed to improve adult literacy, and the Projeto Rondon (Rondon Project), focused on improving living conditions in the Amazon with the participation of young university students. In 1970, it created the National Institute for Colonization and Agrarian Reform (INCRA) and the Department of Education and Research of the Army (DEP), now known as the Department of Education and Culture of the Army (DECEx).

Other welfare projects launched during his administration include: the Programa de Redistribuição de Terras e de Estímulo à Agroindústria do Norte e Nordeste (English: Land Redistribution and Agroindustry Stimulus Program for the North and Northeast - PROTERRA), in 1971; the Programa Especial para o Vale do São Francisco (Special Program for the São Francisco Valley - PROVALE), in 1972; the Programa de Polos Agropecuários e Agrominerais da Amazônia (Amazon Agricultural and Agro-mineral Hubs Program - POLAMAZÔNIA), in 1974; and the Programa de Desenvolvimento de Áreas Integradas do Nordeste (Northeast Integrated Areas Development Program - POLONORDESTE), in 1974.

In 1972, the Sixth Centenary of Brazil's Independence was celebrated and the remains of Emperor Pedro I were brought from Lisbon to São Paulo. Médici created the Order of Precedence in Brazil and signed the Public Records Law the following year.

=== Fighting guerrillas ===
The Médici government, supported by Institutional Act Number Five of December 1968, was responsible for eliminating rural and urban communist guerrillas. The opposition became armed, with bank robberies, attacks on the military, kidnappings of officials and guerrilla training. The confidential report produced by the Aeronautics Security and Information Center (CISA) on March 9, 1972, revealed that President Emílio Médici was going to be bombed during a meeting in Rio with the presidents of Argentina and Uruguay. Another report from CISA showed that Gama e Silva, Minister of Justice in the Costa e Silva government, would also be the subject of an attack.

The command of the political police in the army was centralized and control of repression was assigned to the Minister of the Army, Orlando Geisel. In September 1970, the Information Operations Detachments (DOIs) were created. Accusations of torture against the government increased: there were 308 between 1964 and 1968, 1027 in 1969 and 1206 in 1970. The guerrilla student Chael Charles Schreier, a member of the armed organization VAR-Palmares, opened fire on the police and was arrested in November 1969. He was tortured at the Army Police Barracks because the Army Central Hospital would not accept him as "alive". The bodies of those killed under torture were never handed over to their families.

Communist guerrilla Mário Alves de Souza Vieira, a communications specialist at the Lenin School in the Soviet Union, was the first to go missing, on January 17, 1970. The Castelo Branco government had arrested him in 1964 and released him on habeas corpus in 1965. In 1966, he advocated armed violence in the "Corrente Revolucionária" and had his political rights revoked for 10 years. Between April 11 and 12, 1968, "favourable to an armed struggle strategy", he founded the Revolutionary Brazilian Communist Party, whose inaugural resolution foresaw "the outbreak of urban and rural guerrilla warfare". According to Jacob Gorender, Mário Alves was seen in the Brazilian Communist Party as a coup plotter against the party. Also in 1970, four other citizens disappeared, all seen in army dependencies. In 1970, 29 people linked to armed organizations were killed; in 1971, 46.

==== Kidnappings during the regime ====
Between 1969 and 1970, four kidnappings affected the military dictatorship, creating diplomatic embarrassment on the international stage and inflicting a major political defeat. In September 1969, the US ambassador Charles Burke Elbrick was captured by members of the National Liberation Action (ALN) and the 8th October Revolutionary Movement (MR-8), two of the main armed groups opposed to the dictatorial regime. The kidnappers demanded the reading of a revolutionary manifesto on national television and the release of 15 political prisoners in exchange for Elbrick's freedom. On September 7, Elbrick was released by the hostages.

In 1970, the Japanese consul Nobuo Okushi, the German ambassador Ehrenfried Anton Theodor Ludwig Von Holleben and the Swiss ambassador Giovanni Enrico Bucher were also kidnapped by the Revolutionary Popular Vanguard and National Liberation Action. The logistics of the abductions revealed the offensive ability of the armed groups and forced the military regime to intensify its persecution and repression of those who opposed the dictatorship, acting violently, killing, torturing and annihilating any resistance once and for all.

==== Guerrilla groups defeated during the Médici government ====
- 1966–1971: Revolutionary Popular Vanguard (VPR)
- 1967–1969: National Liberation Command (COLINA)
- 1967–1972: 8th October Revolutionary Movement (MR8)
- 1967–1973: National Liberation Action (ALN)
- 1969–1972: Palmares Armed Revolutionary Vanguard (VAR-Palmares)
- 1970–1971: Popular Liberation Movement (Molipo)

== Foreign policy ==
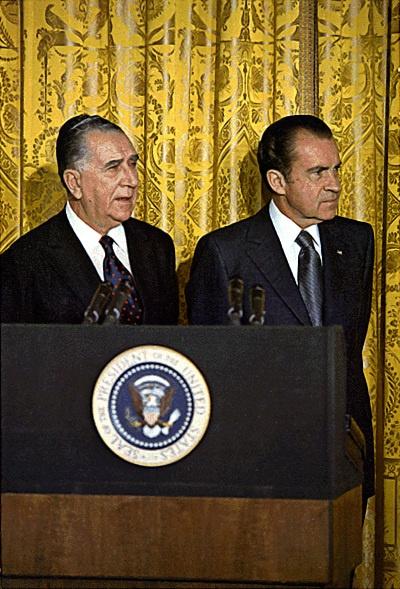
Richard Nixon and Emilio G. Medici

=== United States ===
In December 1971, Médici visited the United States, where he was welcomed with a one-night stay at Camp David without the host present, two meetings with Nixon and a lunch with the vice-president. During the talks between the presidents, in the Oval Office of the White House, the only witness was the interpreter, Vernon Walters, former ambassador to Brazil. Médici offered clandestine support to overthrow Fidel Castro's government in Cuba, while Nixon provided funds to help overthrow Salvador Allende in Chile. The only topic of conversation was Médici's request to promote Arthur Moura to the rank of General, which Nixon promptly granted.

=== Itaipu Dam ===
In 1973, the agreement between Brazil and Paraguay for the construction of the Itaipu Dam was to be concluded, but the victory of the Peronists in Argentina changed the political course. The Brazilian government rushed to draw up the treaty with Paraguay without the participation of Argentina, which, based on technical reports, claimed that the site chosen for the dam would prevent it from taking full advantage of the Yucumã Falls.

In April, during Paraguayan President Alfredo Stroessner's official visit to Brazil, the two countries signed the treaty establishing the Itaipu Binacional Company to build and operate the dam. In August, Brazil and Paraguay ratified the Itaipu Treaty in Asunción and announced the start of construction of the project.

=== Portugal ===
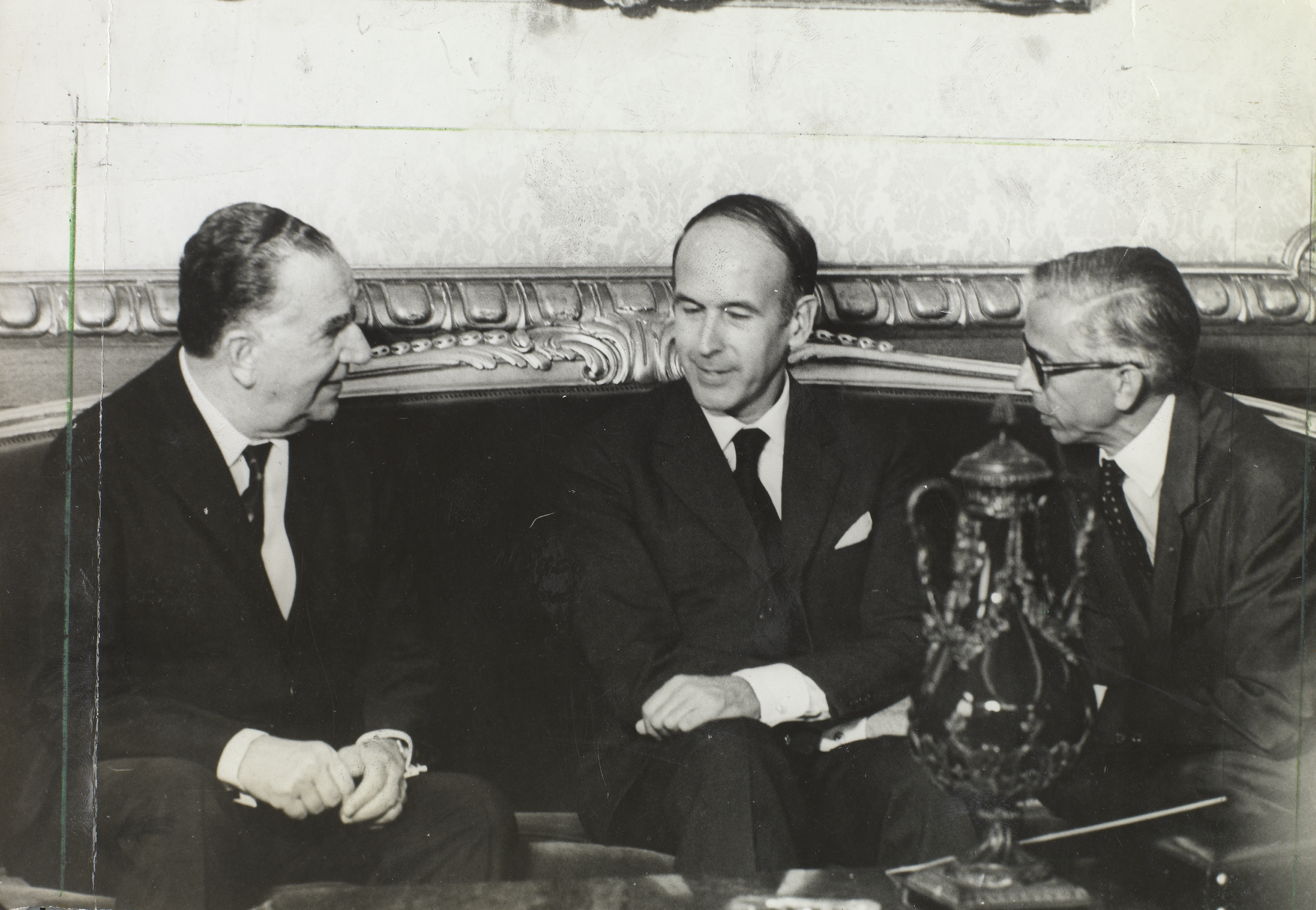
Valery Giscard d'Estaing with Emílio Médici, in a visit to Brazil, 1971.

In May 1972, Médici made an official trip to Portugal. In a meeting with President Américo Tomás and Prime Minister Marcelo Caetano, Brazil opposed the creation of a free trade area with Portugal, as it considered it detrimental to its policy in relation to the Latin American Free Trade Association (ALALC).

=== Bolivia ===
Minister Gibson Barbosa concluded negotiations with Bolivia for the construction of a gas pipeline between Santa Cruz de la Sierra and Paulínia.

=== Cuba ===
At the OAS, Brazil opposed Cuba's return to the organization based on the argument that the Cuban regime would not change its position towards the inter-American system.

=== Chile ===
On 13 September 1973, two days after the Chilean coup d'état, Brazil recognized the military junta that had taken power. According to Veja, the Brazilian position was a personal decision by Médici.

== See also ==
- Military dictatorship in Brazil
