= List of presidents of Brazil by time in office =

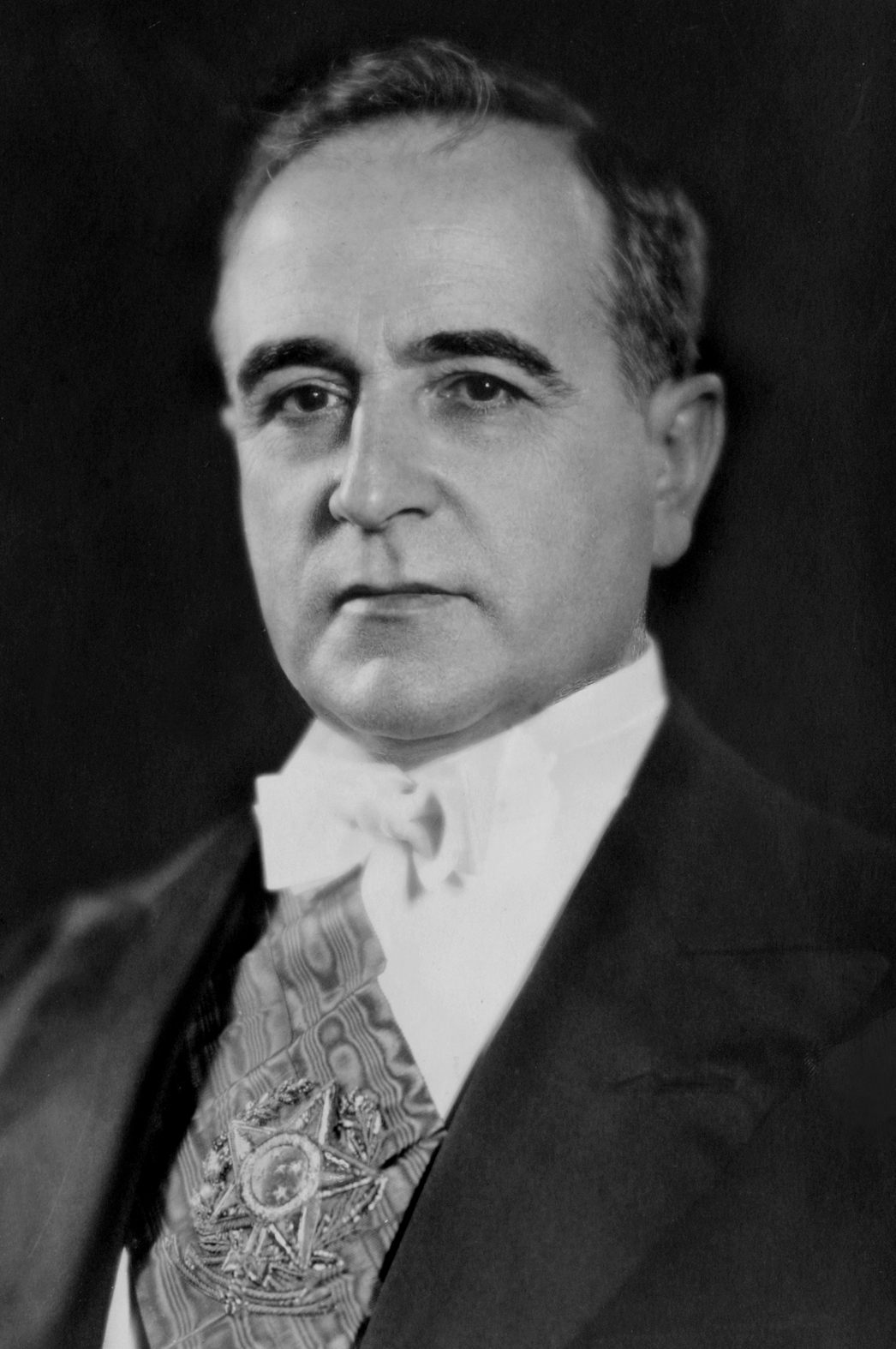
Getúlio Vargas
Longest presidency:
6,775 days
1930–1945
1951–1954

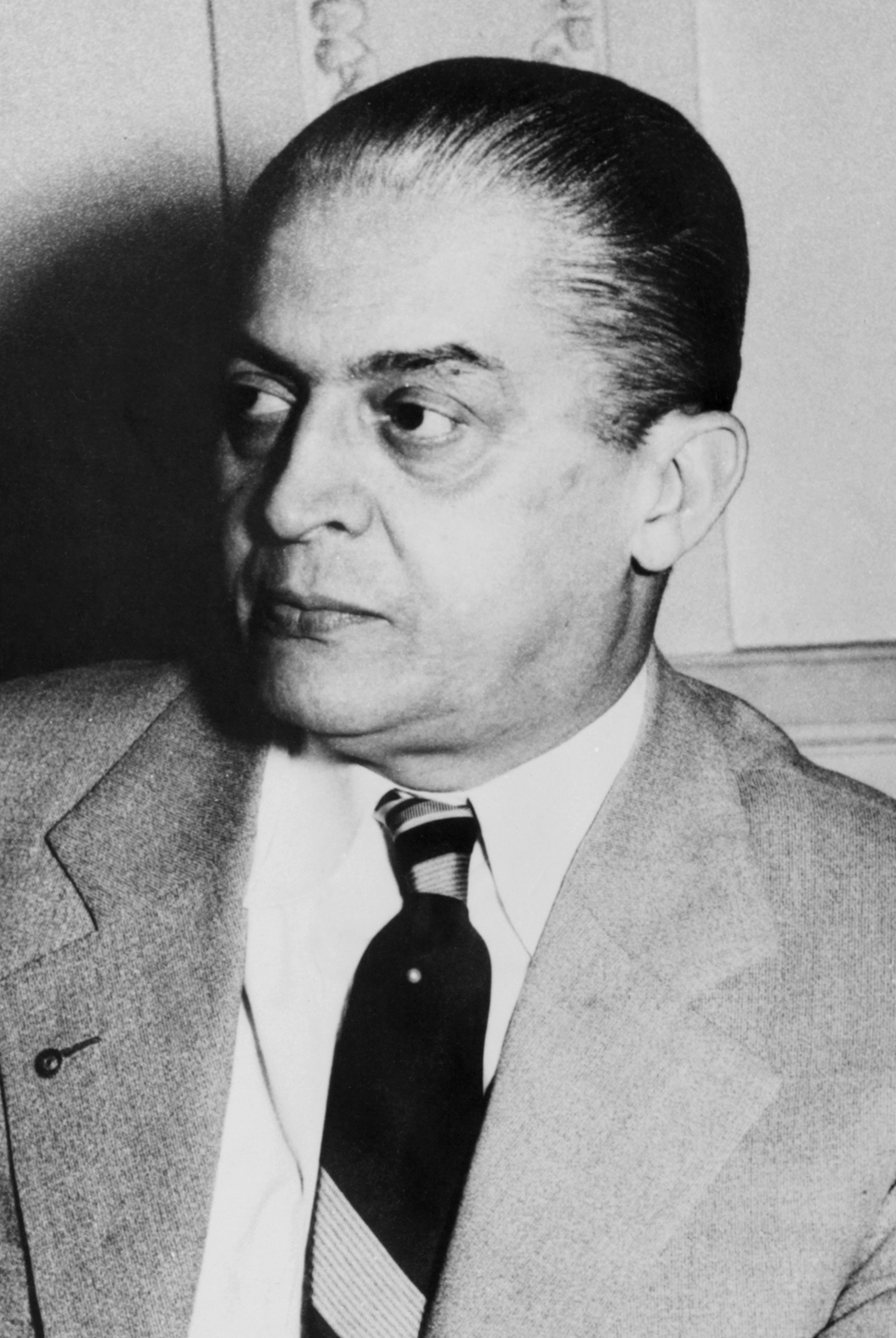
Carlos Luz
Shortest presidency:
3 days
1955

This is a list of presidents of Brazil by time in office. The basis of the list is the difference between dates. Since the Proclamation of the Republic in 1889, there have been 39 presidencies and 36 presidents, as Getúlio Vargas, Ranieri Mazzilli and Luiz Inácio Lula da Silva served non-consecutive terms. Of the individuals elected president, one (Dilma Rousseff) was impeached, four (Deodoro da Fonseca, Getúlio Vargas, Jânio Quadros, and Fernando Collor) resigned and three (Júlio Prestes, Pedro Aleixo, and Tancredo Neves) never took office, while several others died while in office. Carlos Luz spent the shortest time in office, and Getúlio Vargas spent the longest (by both total time and consecutive time). All presidents listed, including the ones that did not take office, are present in the official list.

Since the current Constitution enacted in 1988, 7 people have been sworn into office as President of Brazil.

== Presidents by time in office ==
Rank	President	Length in days	Order of presidency	Number of terms
1	Getúlio Vargas (Note: First consecutive time in office had 5,474 days; second consecutive time in office had 1,301 days)	6,775	14th 3 November 1930 – 29 October 1945	One full term; two partial terms (Note: During the first partial term, he installed a dictatorship that allowed him to rule seven years more than what the previous constitution allowed. During the second partial term, he committed suicide.)
1	Getúlio Vargas	6,775	17th 31 January 1951 – 24 August 1954	One full term; two partial terms
2	Luiz Inácio Lula da Silva	4,271 (Note: As of 11 September 2026.)	35th 1 January 2003 – 1 January 2011	Two full terms; began a third term 1 January 2023
2	Luiz Inácio Lula da Silva	4,271	39th 1 January 2023 – Present	Two full terms; began a third term 1 January 2023
3	Fernando Henrique Cardoso	2,922	34th 1 January 1995 – 1 January 2003	Two full terms
4	João Figueiredo	2,192	30th 15 March 1979 – 15 March 1985	One full term
5	Dilma Rousseff	2,069	36th 1 January 2011 – 31 August 2016	One full term; impeached during second term
6	Juscelino Kubitschek	1,827	21st 31 January 1956 – 31 January 1961	One full term
7 tie	Gaspar Dutra	1,826	16th 31 January 1946 – 31 January 1951	One full term
7 tie	Ernesto Geisel	1,826	29th 15 March 1974 – 15 March 1979	One full term
7 tie	José Sarney	1,826	31st 15 March 1985 – 15 March 1990	One full term
10	Emílio Médici	1,597	28th 30 October 1969 – 15 March 1974	One full term
11 tie	Prudente de Morais	1,461	3rd 15 November 1894 – 15 November 1898	One full term
11 tie	Rodrigues Alves	1,461	5th 15 November 1902 – 15 November 1906	One full term
11 tie	Hermes da Fonseca	1,461	8th 15 November 1910 – 15 November 1914	One full term
11 tie	Venceslau Brás	1,461	9th 15 November 1914 – 15 November 1918	One full term
11 tie	Artur Bernardes	1,461	12th 15 November 1922 – 15 November 1926	One full term
11 tie	Jair Bolsonaro	1,461	38th 1 January 2019 – 1 January 2023	One full term
17	Campos Sales	1,460	4th 15 November 1898 – 15 November 1902	One full term
18	Washington Luís	1,439	13th 15 November 1926 – 24 October 1930	One partial term
19	Epitácio Pessoa	1,206	11th 28 July 1919 – 15 November 1922	One partial term
20	Floriano Peixoto	1,088	2nd 23 November 1891 – 15 November 1894	One partial term
21	Castelo Branco	1,064	26th 15 April 1964 – 15 March 1967	One full term
22	Fernando Collor	1,020	32nd 15 March 1990 – 29 December 1992	Resigned during first term
23	Afonso Pena	942	6th 15 November 1906 – 14 June 1909	One partial term
24	João Goulart	938	24th 7 September 1961 – 2 April 1964	One partial term
25	Costa e Silva	900	27th 15 March 1967 – 31 August 1969	One partial term
26	Michel Temer	853	37th 31 August 2016 – 1 January 2019	One partial term
27	Deodoro da Fonseca	738	1st 15 November 1889 – 23 November 1891	One partial term
28	Itamar Franco	733	33rd 29 December 1992 – 1 January 1995	One partial term
29	Nilo Peçanha	519	7th 14 June 1909 – 15 November 1910	One partial term
30	Café Filho	441	18th 24 August 1954 – 8 November 1955	One partial term
31	Delfim Moreira	255	10th 15 November 1918 – 28 July 1919	One partial term
32	Jânio Quadros	206	22nd 31 January 1961 – 25 August 1961	One partial term
33	José Linhares	94	15th 29 October 1945 – 31 January 1946	One partial term
34	Nereu Ramos	81	20th 11 November 1955 – 31 January 1956	One partial term
35	Junta of 1969	60	— 31 August 1969 – 30 October 1969	Provisional government
36	Ranieri Mazzilli	26 (Note: Both terms had 13 days.)	23rd 25 August 1961 – 7 September 1961	Two partial terms
36	Ranieri Mazzilli	26	25th 2 April 1964 – 15 April 1964	Two partial terms
37	Junta of 1930	10	— 24 October 1930 – 3 November 1930	Provisional government
38	Carlos Luz	3	19th 8 November 1955 – 11 November 1955	One partial term
—	Júlio Prestes	0	—	—
—	Pedro Aleixo	0	—	—
—	Tancredo Neves	0	—	—
