= 1969 Brazilian presidential election =

- 25 October 1969

369 members of the electoral college 185 electoral votes needed to win
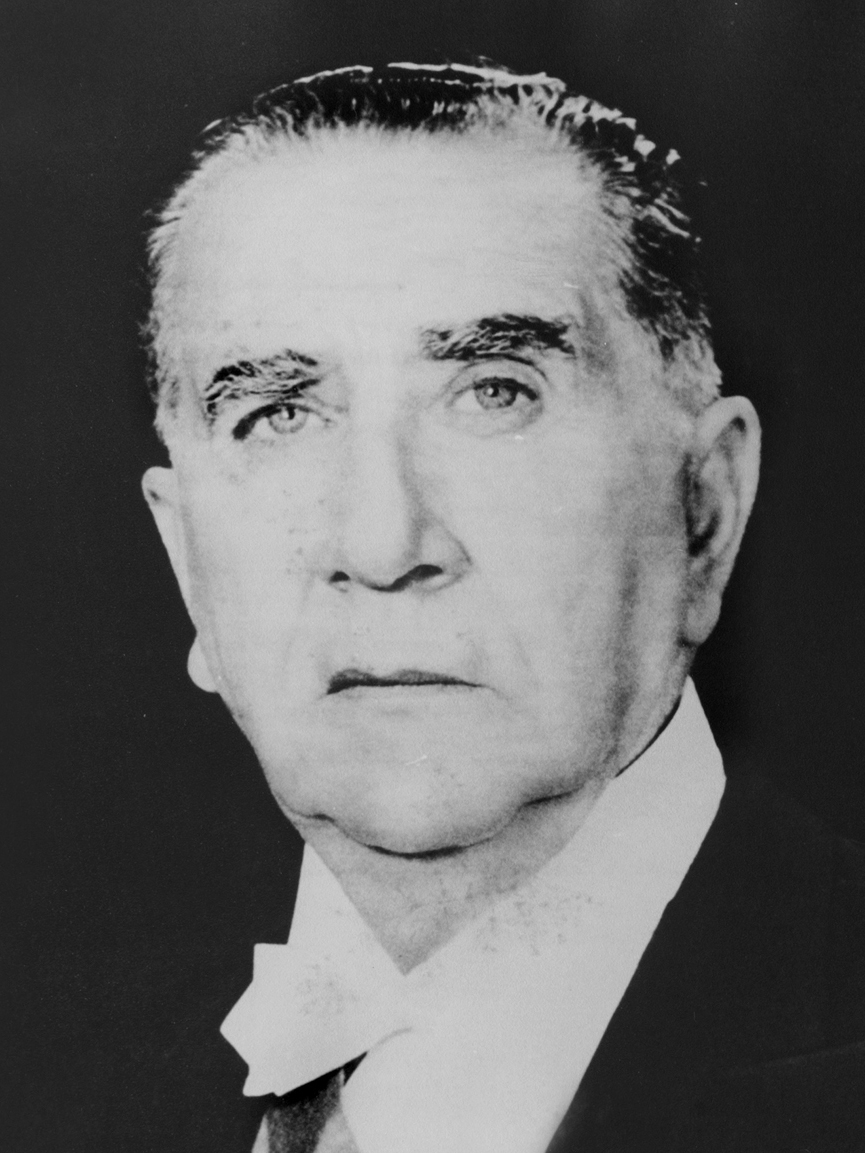
Candidate	Emílio Médici
Party	ARENA
Running mate	Augusto Rademaker
Electoral vote	293
Percentage	100%
President before election
Brazilian Military Junta of 1969
ARENA
Elected President
Emílio Garrastazu Médici
ARENA

Indirect presidential elections were held in Brazil on 25 October 1969. The elections were the third held under the Brazilian military government, and used an electoral college system.

== Background ==
The National Congress had been closed since Institutional Act Number Five was issued on 13 December 1968. President Artur da Costa e Silva left office on 14 October due to ill health, later dying on 17 December. Vice-President Pedro Aleixo was not allowed to replace Costa e Silva, so the Chamber of Deputies and the Federal Senate were reopened to elect the a President and Vice-President, under the Instituctional Act 16.

The candidacies of General Emílio Garrastazu Médici and vice Augusto Rademaker were approved on the National Renewal Alliance Party's national convention on 16 October.

== Results ==
Voting took place in the National Congress on 25 October. There were discourses from Oscar Passos from MDB, Filinto Muller from ARENA and Paulo Brossard from MDB.

Candidate	Running mate	Party	Votes	%
Emílio Médici	Augusto Rademaker	National Renewal Alliance	293	100.00
Total			293	100.00
Source: Folha de S.Paulo
