= Adalberto Pereira dos Santos =

Vice President of Brazil from 1974 to 1979

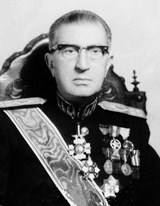

18th Vice President of Brazil
- In office 15 March 1974 – 15 March 1979
- President: Ernesto Geisel
- Preceded by: Augusto Rademaker
- Succeeded by: Aureliano Chaves

President of the Superior Military Court
- In office 19 March 1973 – 9 July 1973
- Preceded by: Valdemar de Figueiredo Costa
- Succeeded by: Jurandir Bizarria Mamede

Justice of the Superior Military Court
- In office 16 May 1969 – 9 July 1973
- Appointed by: Artur da Costa e Silva
- Preceded by: Olímpio Mourão Filho
- Succeeded by: Rodrigo Otávio Jordão Ramos

Chief of the Army General Staff
- In office 29 March 1968 – 11 April 1969
- President: Artur da Costa e Silva
- Preceded by: Orlando Geisel
- Succeeded by: Antônio Carlos da Silva Muricy

Personal details
- Born: 11 April 1905 Taquara, Rio Grande do Sul, Brazil
- Died: 2 April 1984 (aged 78) Rio de Janeiro, Rio de Janeiro, Brazil
- Party: ARENA
- Spouse: Julieta Campos
- Parents: Urbano Alves dos Santos (father); Otília Pereira dos Santos (mother)
- Education: Military School of Realengo

Military service
- Allegiance: Brazil
- Branch/service: Brazilian Army
- Unit: Brazilian Expeditionary Force
- Battles/wars: World War II

Adalberto Pereira dos Santos (11 April 1905 – 2 April 1984) was a Brazilian general and politician.

A veteran of the Brazilian Expeditionary Force during World War II, he served as the Army Chief of Staff during Costa e Silva's presidency and then headed the Superior Military Court.

He was born to Portuguese settler parents. His father emigrated from Ponte de Lima in Northern Portugal in 1898 and owned a cattle ranch. His mother's side of the family emigrated from the Azores.

Santos served as the vice president of Brazil under General Ernesto Geisel from 1974 to 1979. He was the last military vice president of Brazil.

Political offices
Preceded by Augusto Rademaker	Vice President of Brazil; 1974–1979	Succeeded by Aureliano Chaves
