= 1969 in Brazilian television =

This is a list of Brazilian television related events from 1969.

== Events ==
- 15 June - TV Cultura resumes operations under its current owner.
- 1 September - Jornal Nacional from TV Globo, the first news program in the country to be broadcast nationwide, debuts to compete with Repórter Esso, from TV Tupi. Hilton Gomes debuts on Jornal Nacional, alongside Cid Moreira.

== Debuts ==
- Jornal Nacional

== Networks and services ==
=== Launches ===
Network	Type	Launch date	Notes	Source
TV Caxias	Terrestrial	22 February		
TV Aratu	Terrestrial	15 March		
TV Tibagi	Terrestrial	26 July		
TV Coligadas	Terrestrial	1 September		
TV Ajuricaba	Terrestrial	5 September		
TV Difusora RS	Terrestrial	10 October		
TV Imembuí	Terrestrial	13 December		

=== Conversions and rebrandings ===
Old network name	New network name	Type	Conversion Date	Notes	Source
C-2 Cultura	TV Cultura	Cable and satellite	15 June		

== Births ==
- 16 January - Daniela Escobar, actress & TV host
- 6 November - Leona Cavalli, actress

== See also ==
- 1969 in Brazil
