= Scylla Médici =

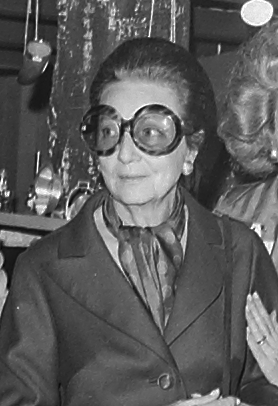

First Lady of Brazil
- In role 30 October 1969 – 15 March 1974
- President: Emílio Garrastazu Médici
- Preceded by: Iolanda Costa e Silva
- Succeeded by: Lucy Geisel

Personal details
- Born: Scylla Gaffrée Nogueira; 4 October 1907 Bagé, Rio Grande do Sul, Brazil
- Died: 25 January 2003 (aged 95) Rio de Janeiro, Rio de Janeiro, Brazil
- Spouse: Emílio Garrastazu Médici (m. 1933; died 1985)
- Children: Sérgio Nogueira Médici (d. 2008); Roberto Nogueira Médici

Scylla Gaffrée Nogueira Médici (4 October 1907 – 25 January 2003) was the First Lady of Brazil between 1969 and 1974 and the wife of Brazilian President Emílio Garrastazu Médici.

With her husband, she had two sons: Sérgio and Roberto. As a Brazilian first lady, Scylla was discreet. Her husband died in 1985. Scylla Médici died of natural causes, in a public hospital, aged 95, in Rio de Janeiro on 25 January 2003.

Honorary titles
Preceded by Iolanda Barbosa	First Lady of Brazil; 1969–74	Succeeded by Lucy Markus
