= Golbery do Couto e Silva =

Brazilian general and politician

General Golbery do Couto e Silva

Chief of Staff of the Presidency
- In office 15 March 1974 – 6 August 1981
- President: Ernesto Geisel; João Figueiredo
- Preceded by: João Leitão de Abreu
- Succeeded by: João de Carvalho Oliveira

Justice of the Federal Court of Accounts
- In office 30 March 1967 – 18 September 1968
- Appointed by: Costa e Silva
- Preceded by: Antônio Brochado da Rocha
- Succeeded by: Guilhermino de Oliveira

Head of the National Information Service
- In office 25 June 1964 – 15 March 1967
- President: Castelo Branco
- Preceded by: Office established
- Succeeded by: Emílio Garrastazu Médici

Personal details
- Born: 21 August 1911 Rio Grande, Rio Grande do Sul, Brazil
- Died: 18 September 1987 (aged 76) São Paulo, São Paulo, Brazil
- Party: ARENA
- Spouse: Esmeralda Fierro (m. 1935)
- Children: 3
- Education: Military School of Realengo

Military service
- Allegiance: Brazil
- Branch/service: Brazilian Army
- Years of service: 1927–1961
- Rank: Divisional general
- Battles/wars: Constitutionalist Revolution; Second World War

Golbery do Couto e Silva (21 August 1911 – 18 September 1987) was a Brazilian general and politician.

== Biography ==
Golbery do Couto e Silva was born in Rio Grande, a city in the Southern State of Rio Grande do Sul, Brazil. At the age of 16, he joined the Military School of Realengo, Rio de Janeiro, which bred officials for the country's Army. On 22 November 1930, he graduated first among all classes becoming an Aspirant Officer. His Combat Arms Branch was Infantry, and by 1932 he was among the 9th Infantry Regiment quenching the 1932 Revolution in São Paulo.

As a lieutenant, he also served in the 6th Infantry Regiment. In May 1937 he was promoted to captain and began to serve on the National Security Council. Later he was sent to Curitiba in the state of Parana. Soon after, he was assigned to Joinville, serving in the 13th Chasseurs' Brigade.

In December 1940, he was the only official who was accepted to join Brazil's Army's Higher Command and Staff Course. By the time he graduated, in August 1943, he was appointed to serve at the 3rd Military Region, in Porto Alegre, the capital of Rio Grande do Sul. A year later, in 1944, he trained with the US Army and was soon appointed to serve in the Second World War at the Brazilian Expeditionary Force as an Intelligence Officer remaining in the position until the end of the war.

Returning to Brazil in October 1946, Captain Golbery do Couto e Silva was reassigned to the state of Rio Grande do Sul and then to Rio de Janeiro when promoted to Army Major and appointed to serve at the Army's Higher Command.

Golbery's path to the highest rank included participating in a Military Mission to Paraguay thenceforth 1947, where he remained for three years. By 1951, he was promoted to Lieutenant Colonel and assigned to serve as Deputy Head of the Army's Information Division. As of 1952, he had been designated Deputy Head of the Studies Department within Brazil's War College's Division for International Affairs, later being assigned to the college's Executive Division.

Passing by Belo Horizonte, he was later reassigned to the Army's Higher Command, now as a Colonel, serving in the Operations Division within the Sub-Division of Doctrine. In 1960, he was promoted to Army General and, until February 1961, he was Head of the Operations Division under the Army's Higher Command. In September 1961, serving as Chief of Staff at the National Security Council's General Secretariat, Golbery retired from the military.

As a civilian, he headed the Institute for Social Studies and Research, a conservative think tank based in Rio de Janeiro. After the civilian-military coup d'État on 31 March 1964, he was appointed Head of Brazil's secret service, the National Information Service, later serving as Chief of Staff under the terms of Army General Geisel and of Army General Figueiredo, in the late 1970s and early 1980s.

== The Doctrine of National Security ==
In 1955, Brazil's Army's Publisher launched Golbery's Planejamento Estratégico (Strategic Planning). His contributions in the form of books did not stop there.

In Geopolítica do Brasil (Brazil's Geopolitics), launched in 1966, he forged the notion of a National Security Doctrine underscoring the intrinsic relationship between security and development. Aiming to reclaim the debate from an ideological spectrum that allegedly corrupted Brazil's national interests and identity, his argument revolved around the imperative of an active role played by the State in the economy, which would trickle down as a measure of national security. The book is considered to be seminal for Brazil's civilian-military authoritarian regime.

At age 76, he passed in São Paulo.

Government offices
New office	Head of the National Information Service; 1964–1967	Succeeded by Emílio Garrastazu Médici
Political offices
Preceded by João Leitão de Abreu	Chief of Staff of the Presidency; 1974–1981	Succeeded by João de Carvalho Oliveira
