= Márcio Melo =

Brazilian air marshal (1906–1991)

Member of the Brazilian Military Junta
- In office 31 August 1969 – 30 October 1969 Serving with Augusto Rademaker, Lira Tavares
- Preceded by: Artur da Costa e Silva (as president)
- Succeeded by: Emílio Garrastazu Médici (as president)

Minister of Aeronautics
- In office 15 March 1967 – 29 November 1971
- President: Artur da Costa e Silva; Military Junta; Emílio Garrastazu Médici
- Preceded by: Eduardo Gomes
- Succeeded by: Joelmir Campos de Araripe Macedo
- In office 15 December 1964 – 11 January 1965
- President: Castelo Branco
- Preceded by: Nelson Freire Lavanère-Wanderley
- Succeeded by: Eduardo Gomes

Personal details
- Born: Márcio de Sousa Melo; 26 May 1906 Florianópolis, Santa Catarina, Brazil
- Died: 31 January 1991 (aged 84) Rio de Janeiro, Rio de Janeiro, Brazil
- Spouse: Zilda Andrade
- Children: 2
- Parent(s): Francisco Agostinho de Sousa (father); Maria dos Anjos Malheiros (mother)

Military service
- Allegiance: Brazil
- Branch/service: Brazilian Air Force
- Rank: Marshal of the Air
- Commands: See list: Santos Air Force Base; Chief of Staff of the Minister of Aeronautics; School of Command and General Staff of the Air Force; 3rd Air Zone; 4th Air Zone; Inspector General of Aeronautics
- Battles/wars: Second World War; 1964 Brazilian coup d'état
- Awards: • Grand Cross of the Military Order of Aviz • Commander of the Order of Aeronautical Merit

Márcio de Sousa e Melo (26 May 1906 – 31 January 1991) was a Brazilian Air Marshal. He was one of the military in the joint military board that ruled Brazil between the illness of Artur da Costa e Silva in August 1969 and the investiture ceremony of Emílio Garrastazu Médici in October of that same year.

During the government of the junta, the American ambassador to Brazil Charles Burke Elbrick was kidnapped by the communist guerilla group Revolutionary Movement 8th October — radical opposition to the military dictatorship.

Political offices
Preceded by Artur da Costa e Silva as President	Member of the Brazilian Military Junta; 1969; Served alongside: Augusto Rademaker, Lira Tavares	Succeeded by Emílio Garrastazu Médici as President
