= Aurélio de Lira Tavares =

Brazilian army officer (1905–1998)

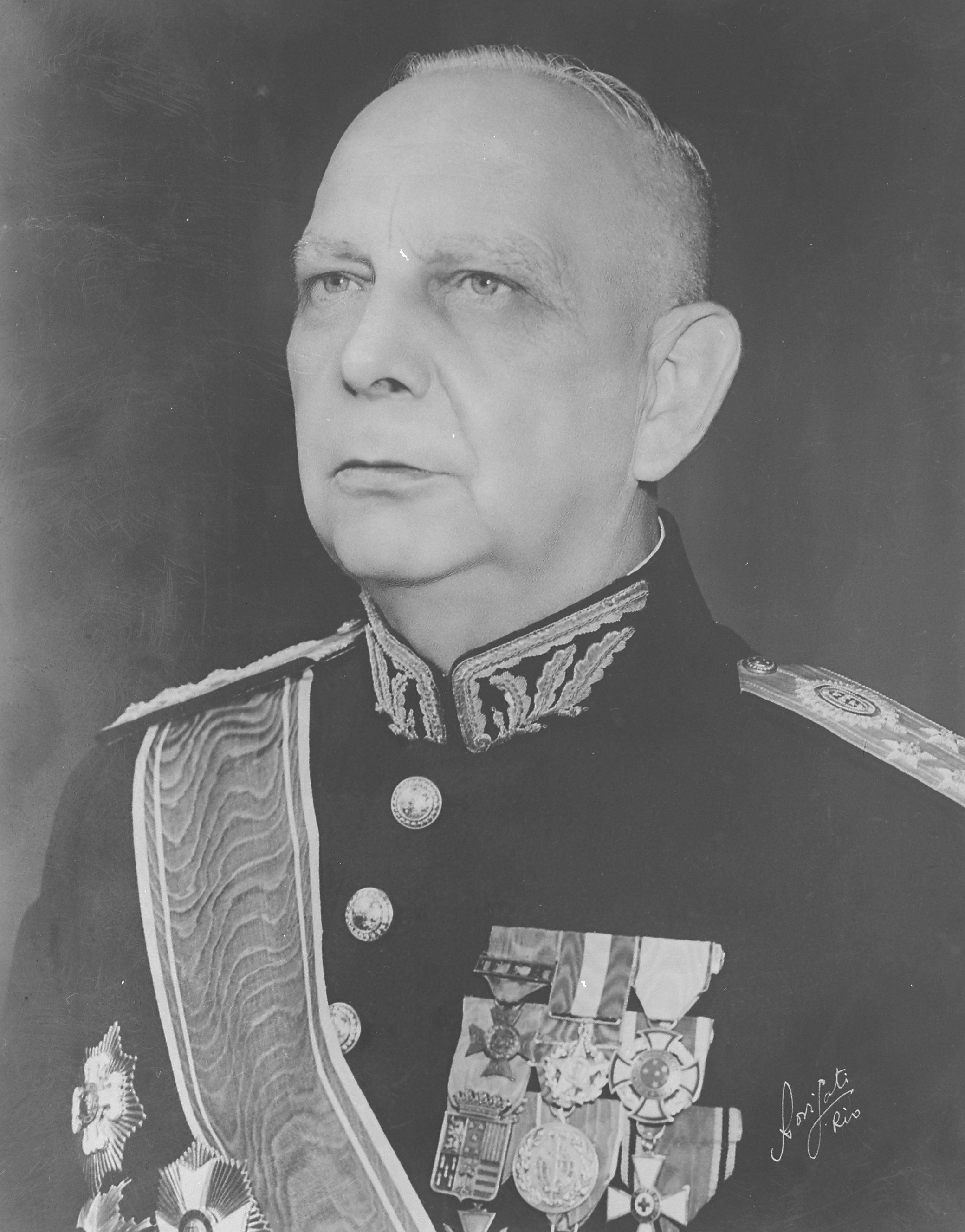

Member of the Brazilian Military Junta
- In office 31 August 1969 – 30 October 1969 Serving with Augusto Rademaker, Márcio Melo
- Preceded by: Artur da Costa e Silva (as President)
- Succeeded by: Emílio Garrastazu Médici (as President)
Other political offices
Ambassador of Brazil to France
In office 22 July 1970 – 17 December 1974
Nominated by	Emílio Garrastazu Médici
Preceded by	Olavo Billac Pinto
Succeeded by	Antônio Delfim Netto
Minister of the Army
In office 15 March 1967 – 30 October 1969
President	Artur da Costa e Silva; Military Junta
Preceded by	Ademar de Queirós
Succeeded by	Orlando Geisel
Chief Minister of the Military Cabinet
In office 12 June 1963 – 18 October 1963
President	João Goulart
Preceded by	Albino Silva
Succeeded by	Argemiro de Assis Brasil
In office 19 September 1961 – 12 July 1962
Prime Minister	Tancredo Neves
Preceded by	Amaury Kruel
Succeeded by	Amaury Kruel

Personal details
- Born: Aurélio de Lira Tavares; 7 November 1905 João Pessoa, Paraíba, Brazil
- Died: 18 November 1998 (aged 93) Rio de Janeiro, Rio de Janeiro, Brazil
- Spouse: Isolina Maria Leitão de Abreu (m. 1934)
- Children: 2
- Parents: João de Lira Tavares (father); Rosa Amélia de Araújo (mother)
- Education: Military School of Realengo; Faculty of Law of Rio de Janeiro; Polytechnic School of Rio de Janeiro; Officer Advanced Training School; Army General Staff School

Military service
- Allegiance: Brazil
- Branch/service: Brazilian Army
- Years of service: 1925–1970
- Rank: Army general
- Commands: See list: 2nd Section of the Special Staff of the Brazilian Expeditionary Force; Brazilian Military Mission during the Berlin Blockade; 4th Section of the Armed Forces General Staff; Army General Staff Office; Division Artillery of the 5th Infantry Division; Army Communications Director; General Staff of the 1st Army; 2nd Military Region; Northeastern Military Command; Army Production and Works Department; Superior School of War
- Battles/wars: Second World War; Cold War; 1964 Brazilian coup d'état

Aurélio de Lira Tavares (7 November 1905 – 18 November 1998) was a general in the Brazilian Army. He was one of the military in the joint military board that ruled Brazil between the illness of Artur da Costa e Silva in August 1969 and the investiture ceremony of Emílio Garrastazu Médici in October of that same year.

During the government of the junta, the American ambassador to Brazil Charles Burke Elbrick was kidnapped by the communist guerrilla group Revolutionary Movement 8th October — radical opposition to the military dictatorship.

== Biography ==
A student at the Realengo Military School in Rio de Janeiro, he also graduated in law and engineering.

He commanded the 3rd Combat Engineer Battalion in Cachoeira do Sul, Rio Grande do Sul, from June 27, 1950 to November 14, 1952.

He was Commander of the 2nd Military Region, in São Paulo, from January 18, 1962 to March 7, 1963.

He commanded the IV Army, in Recife, from October 10, 1964 to October 27, 1965.

He was Commander of the Superior War School, between 28 September 1966 and 13 March 1967. He then served as Minister of the Army in the Costa e Silva government, between 15 March 1967 and 30 October 1969.

With the President of the Republic stepping down for health reasons, Lira Tavares joined a triumvirate also formed by Admiral Augusto Rademaker (his president) and Brigadier Márcio de Sousa Melo. In this capacity, he and his colleagues governed the country until General Emílio Garrastazu Médici was chosen as President of the Republic.

He was a member of the Brazilian Academy of Letters, elected in April 1970. In his poetry he used the pseudonym Adelita, which was composed of the initials of his name. His reception was hosted by Ivan Monteiro de Barros Lins. After serving on the military junta, he was Brazil's ambassador to Paris from 1970 to 1974.

On February 3, 1965, he was awarded the Grand Cross of the Order of Prince Henry the Navigator. On February 26, 1971, he was awarded the Grand Cross of the Military Order of Avis of Portugal.

He died in Rio de Janeiro on November 18, 1998, at the age of 93.

== See also ==
- List of presidents of Brazil
- Brazilian military government
- Augusto Rademaker
- Márcio Melo

Political offices
Preceded by Artur da Costa e Silva as President	Member of the Brazilian Military Junta; 1969; Served alongside: Augusto Rademaker, Márcio Melo	Succeeded by Emílio Garrastazu Médici as President
Government offices
Preceded by Ademar de Queirós	Minister of the Army; 1967–69	Succeeded by Orlando Geisel
Preceded by Amaury Kruel	Chief Minister of the Military Cabinet; 1961–62; 1963	Succeeded by Amaury Kruel
Preceded by Albino Silva	Chief Minister of the Military Cabinet; 1961–62; 1963	Succeeded by Argemiro de Assis Brasil
Honorary titles
Preceded by Múcio Leão	6th Academic of the 20th Chair of the Brazilian Academy of Letters; 1970–1998	Succeeded by Murilo Melo Filho
