= Brazilian Miracle =

Period of economic growth in Brazil

Brazil: love it or leave it, a slogan of the military regime

The Brazilian Miracle (Portuguese: milagre econômico brasileiro) was a period of exceptional economic growth in Brazil during the rule of the Brazilian military dictatorship, achieved via a heterodox and developmentalist model. During this time the average annual GDP growth was close to 10%. The greatest economic growth was reached during the tenure of President Emílio Garrastazu Médici from 1969 to 1973.

The Rio–Niterói Bridge, one of the so-called "pharaonic projects", being built in 1971

James Petras argues the short-lived economic miracle in Brazil was based on:

a) violent illegitimate seizure of political power by the military;

b) the institutionalization of violence through an extensive and intensive system of military-police controls throughout civil society;

c) the systematic use of terror to contain popular discontent, to disarticulate mass organizations and to destroy guerrilla resistance;

d) the elaboration of the National Security ideology to justify the State's "permanent state of war" against autonomous class or nationalist movements.

Perception of the so-called "Golden Age" of Brazilian development was strengthened in 1970, when Brazil, for the third time, won the FIFA World Cup, in 1972, when Emerson Fittipaldi became Formula One world champion for the first time, and the official adoption of the slogan "Brasil, ame-o ou deixe-o" ("Brazil, love it or leave it") by the Brazilian military government.

According to Elio Gaspari, in his book A Ditadura Escancarada: "The Brazilian Miracle and the Years of Lead occurred simultaneously. Both were real, coexisting while denying each other. More than thirty years later, they continue to deny each other. Those who think one existed don't believe (or don't like to admit) that the other did."

== Background ==
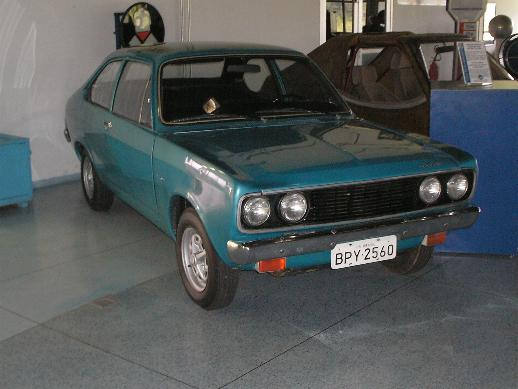
A Dodge 1800 was the first prototype engineered with an ethanol-only engine. Exhibit at the Memorial Aeroespacial Brasileiro, CTA, São José dos Campos.

During the presidency of João Goulart, the economy was nearing a crisis, and the annual inflation rate reached 100%. After the 1964 coup d'état, the Brazilian military was more concerned with political control and left economic policy to a group of entrusted technocrats, led by Delfim Netto.

Brazil became an urban society, with 67% of its people living in cities. That was caused by a population shift from the poorer countryside to the booming cities, with São Paulo growing faster than the others.

Brazil relied on a heterodox, developmentalist model. Its expansion in this period relied on low wages, rapidly rising exports, and foreign capital inflows.

The growth during this period is associated with the government minister who oversaw the strategy, Antônio Delfim Netto. Delfim Netto originated the phrase "cake theory" in reference to this model: the cake had to grow before it could be distributed.

== Successes ==
The government became directly involved in the economy, as it invested heavily in new highways, bridges, and railroads. Steel mills, petrochemical factories, hydroelectric power plants, and nuclear reactors were built by the large state-owned companies Eletrobras and Petrobras. To reduce the dependency on imported oil, ethanol industry was heavily promoted.

By 1980, 57% of Brazil's exports were industrial goods, compared with 20% in 1968.

In this period, the annual GDP growth rate jumped from 9.8% per year in 1968 to 14% in 1973 and inflation rose from 19.46% in 1968 to 34.55% in 1974.

== Problems ==
To fuel its economic growth, Brazil needed more and more imported oil. The early years of the Brazilian Miracle had sustainable growth and borrowing. However, the 1973 oil crisis made the military government increasingly borrow from international lenders, and the debt became unmanageable. By the end of the decade, Brazil had the largest debt in the world: about US$92 billion.

Economic growth ended with the 1979 energy crisis, which led to years of recession and hyperinflation.
