= Rio–Niterói Bridge =

Bridge in Rio de Janeiro, Brazil

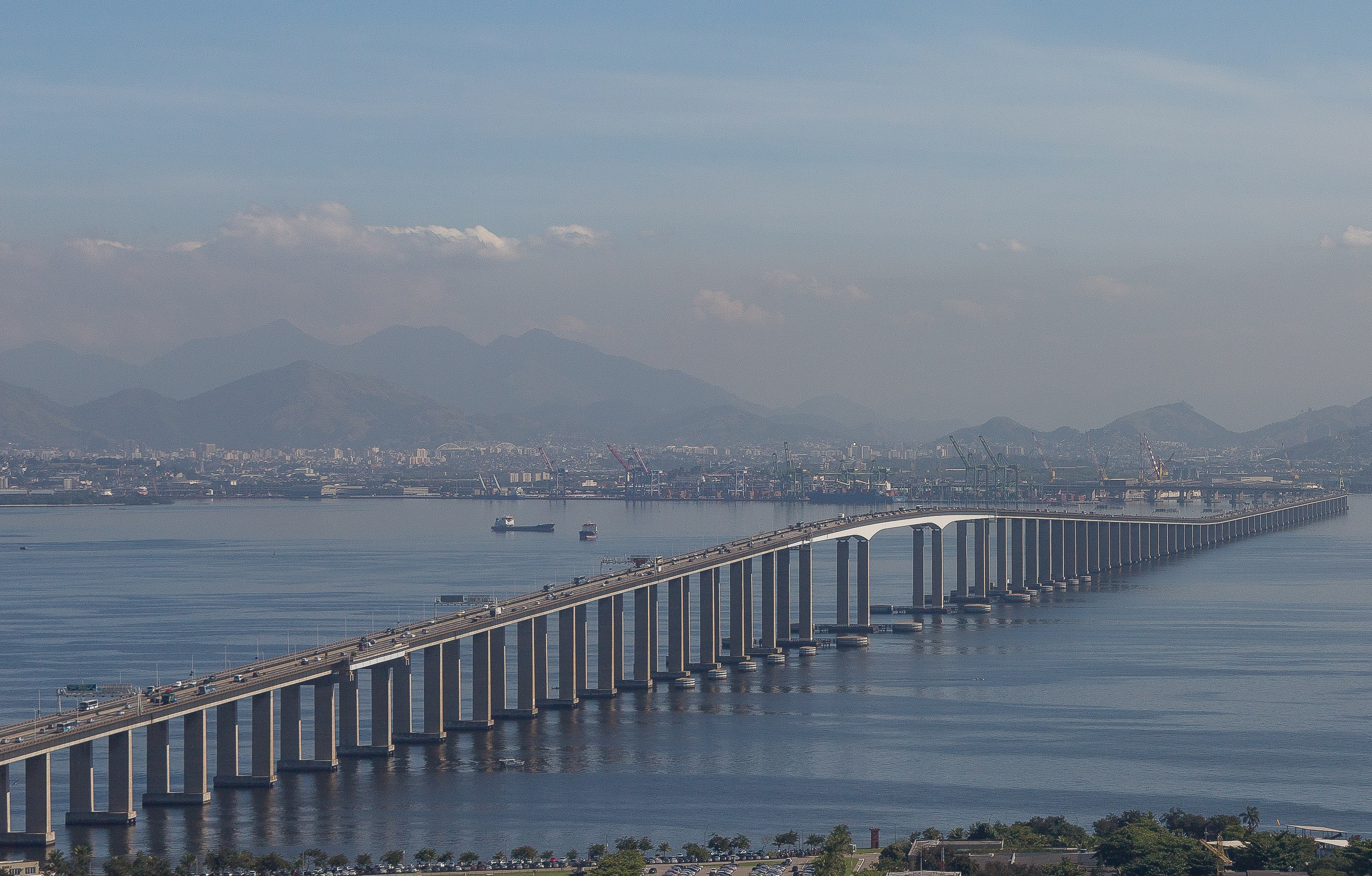
- Coordinates: 22°52′16″S 43°09′12″W
- Carries: 8 lanes of BR-101
- Crosses: Guanabara Bay
- Locale: Rio de Janeiro and Niterói, Brazil
- Official name: President Costa e Silva Bridge

Characteristics
- Design: Box girder bridge
- Total length: 13.29 km (8.26 mi)
- Width: 27 metres (89 ft)
- Longest span: 300 m

History
- Construction start: January 1969
- Opened: 4 March 1974

Statistics
- Daily traffic: 140,000
- Toll: Yes

Location
- Interactive map of Rio–Niterói Bridge

The Rio–Niterói Bridge (in Portuguese: Ponte Rio-Niterói), officially the President Costa e Silva Bridge, is a box girder bridge spanning the Guanabara Bay, connecting the cities of Rio de Janeiro and Niterói in the State of Rio de Janeiro, Brazil. It is currently the second longest bridge in Latin America, after the Metro Line 1 bridge, and the 48th longest in the world in 2020. From its completion in 1974 until 1985 it was the world's second-longest bridge, second only to the Lake Pontchartrain Causeway.

It is 13.29 kilometres (8.26 mi) long – 8.836 kilometres (5.490 mi) over water and the bridge's 300-metre (980 ft) central span is 72 metres (236 ft) high in order to allow the passage of hundreds of ships entering and leaving the bay every month. At the time it was completed, the central span was the longest box girder in the world; it has since been surpassed by the 301-metre (988 ft) main span of the Stolma Bridge (1998) and the 330-metre (1,080 ft) main span of the second Shibanpo Bridge (2006). The bridge carries an average of 76,000 vehicles per day but can accommodate more than 150,000 daily crossings during high-traffic periods such as Carnival.

Officially, it is part of federal highway BR-101. From 1 June 1995, it was under the management of Ponte S.A. under a 20-year concession until 1 June 2015 since when Ecoponte has managed the bridge.

== History ==
Construction of the bridge in 1971.

The concept dates to 1875, when a bridge-and-tunnel connection was envisioned between two cities separated by Guanabara Bay and connected by road only via inland journey of more than 100 kilometers (62 mi) through the city of Magé.

In 1963, a working group was created to study a bridge-building project. On 29 December 1965, an executive committee was formed to run the bridge-building program. President Artur da Costa e Silva signed a decree on 23 August 1968, authorizing the project for the bridge. The bridge program was run by Minister of Transport Mário Andreazza.

Construction began symbolically on 9 November 1968, in the presence of Queen Elizabeth II of the United Kingdom on her only visit to Brazil. Actual work began in December 1968.

Initially, the bridge was constructed by a consortium of Brazilian companies led by Camargo Correa SA (for the concrete works) and by Cleveland Bridge & Engineering Company and Redpath Dorman Long in association with Montreal Engenharia of Brazil (for the steel navigation spans). On January 26, 1971, President Emílio Garrastazu Médici signed a decree taking control of the consortium.

The bridge opened on 4 March 1974, on a Monday morning, with the official name of President Costa e Silva Bridge. "Rio-Niterói" started as a descriptive nickname that soon became better known than the official name. Today hardly anyone refers to it by its official name.

In 2012 a bill was introduced to change its official name, President Costa e Silva Bridge - the second president of the Brazilian military dictatorship between 1964 and 1985 - to Herbert de Souza Bridge, which has annoyed the Brazilian military.

== Controversy ==
Officially, 33 people died during the construction of the bridge. Unofficial estimates put the death toll in excess of 400. Some people suggested that workers were buried within the concrete, but engineer Bruno Contarini contested that by saying, "There wasn’t even concrete when one of the foundations toppled over during the load test and eight people died. If any bodies were not rescued, it’s because they disappeared in the bay, not because they were buried in concrete."

== Pop culture ==
In 1977, the famous Brazilian singer Maysa died in a car crash on the bridge.

In 2011, the bridge was featured in the film Fast Five. The Puerto Rican bridge Teodoro Moscoso doubled for the bridge during the last moments of the film.

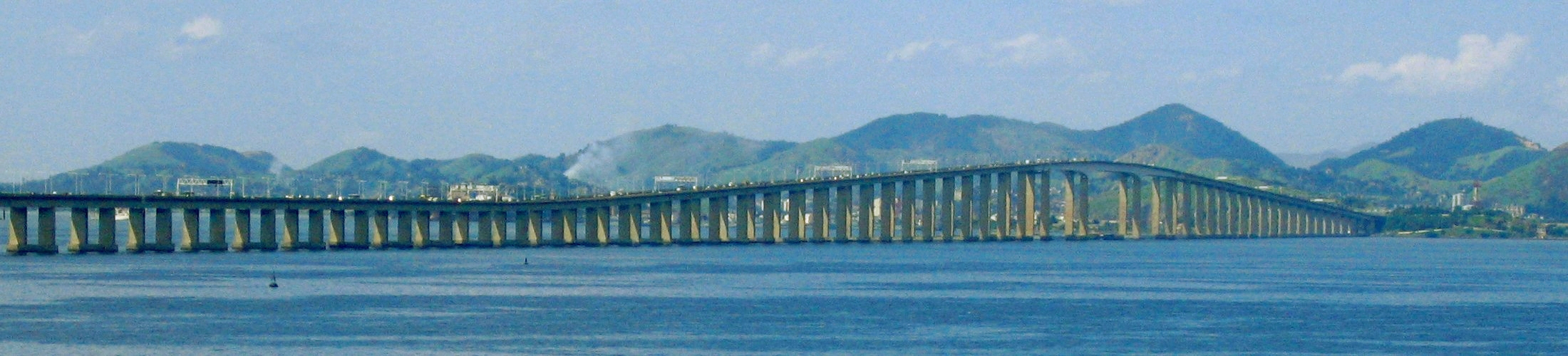
Panoramic view
