= Pedro Aleixo =

Vice President of Brazil from 1967 to 1969

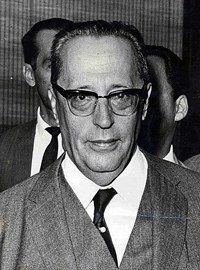

President-designate of Brazil (Note: A military junta composed of the Ministers in charge of the three branches of the Armed Forces assumed the powers of the presidency on 31 August 1969 after President Costa e Sliva suffered a cerebral thrombosis that left him completely incapacitated. The military junta seized power so as to prevent Vice President Pedro Aleixo, a civilian, from becoming acting president. The possibility of a civilian, even a conservative one, assuming the powers of the presidency was seen as detrimental to the continuity of the military regime. In the initial stage of the President's disease, the junta hoped that he would recover. Subsequently, realizing that the President's condition was irreversible, and that the prolonged continuity of a triumvirate was detrimental to the regime and to its image, the military junta issued an institutional act on 14 October 1969 removing the incapacitated president and the vice president from office and summoning Congress to elect a new president and vice president. The military elite that controlled the regime then selected General Emílio Garrastazu Médici to be ARENA's candidate, and his name was rubber-stamped by Congress. The junta remained in place until the new president was sworn in. In 2011, Brazil enacted a Federal Law recognizing the illegality of the acts that prevented Vice President Pedro Aleixo from becoming acting president and that removed him from office; the statute also directs that Pedro Aleixo be deemed a former president of the Republic. Costa e Silva died less than three months after his removal, and were it not for the military acts now declared illegal that removed him from the vice presidency, Pedro Aleixo would have succeeded to the presidency.)
- In role 31 August 1969 – 14 October 1969
- Vice President: None
- Preceded by: Costa e Silva
- Succeeded by: Emílio Médici

16th Vice President of Brazil
- In office 15 March 1967 – 14 October 1969
- President: Costa e Silva
- Preceded by: José Maria Alkmin
- Succeeded by: Augusto Rademaker

Minister of Education
- In office 10 January 1966 – 30 June 1966
- President: Castelo Branco
- Preceded by: Suplicy de Lacerda
- Succeeded by: Raymundo de Aragão

President of the Chamber of Deputies
- In office 5 May 1937 – 10 November 1937
- Preceded by: Antônio Carlos Ribeiro de Andrada
- Succeeded by: Honório Monteiro

Member of the Chamber of Deputies
- In office 1 February 1959 – 11 July 1966
- Constituency: Minas Gerais
- In office 3 May 1935 – 10 November 1937
- Constituency: Minas Gerais

State Deputy of Minas Gerais
- In office 19 March 1947 – 1 February 1951
- Constituency: At-large

Personal details
- Born: 1 August 1901 Mariana, Minas Gerais, Brazil
- Died: 3 March 1975 (aged 73) Belo Horizonte, Minas Gerais, Brazil
- Party: ARENA (1965–1973)
- Other political affiliations: PRM (1932–1937); UDN (1945–1965)
- Profession: Lawyer, politician, professor

Pedro Aleixo (1 August 1901 – 3 March 1975) was a Brazilian lawyer, professor, and politician who served as President of the Chamber of Deputies in 1937 and as the vice president of Brazil from 15 March 1967 to 14 October 1969.

He taught penal law at the Faculty of Law of Belo Horizonte.

As president of the Chamber of Deputies he witnessed the coup d'état that installed the dictatorship of the Estado Novo in Brazil.

Aleixo was the last vice president to hold the office of President of the Senate. As vice president, he was the designate to succeed Artur da Costa e Silva after he became incapacitated due to disease, but Aleixo was removed from the vice presidency on 14 October 1969 by the Brazilian military junta of 1969, which took the acting presidency instead.

In September 2011, pursuant to Law Nº 12.486, Aleixo was included in the gallery of those who were anointed by the Brazilian Nation to the Supreme Magistracy. This means that he should be considered an ex-president, for all legal purposes.

== Notes ==
Political offices
Preceded by Antônio Carlos Ribeiro de Andrada	President of the Chamber of Deputies; 1937	Succeeded by Honório Monteiro
Preceded by Suplicy de Lacerda	Minister of Education; 1966	Succeeded by Raymundo de Aragão
Preceded by José Maria Alkmin	Vice President of Brazil; 1967–1969	Succeeded by Augusto Rademaker
