= Augusto Rademaker =

Vice President of Brazil from 1969 to 1974

His Excellency Admiral Augusto Rademaker GCTE GCA
- Rademaker in 1968

Member of the Brazilian Military Junta
- In office 31 August 1969 – 30 October 1969 Serving with Lira Tavares, Márcio Melo
- Preceded by: Artur da Costa e Silva (as President)
- Succeeded by: Emílio Garrastazu Médici (as President)

17th Vice President of Brazil
- In office 30 October 1969 – 15 March 1974
- President: Emílio Garrastazu Médici
- Preceded by: Pedro Aleixo
- Succeeded by: Adalberto Pereira dos Santos

Ministerial portfolios
- 1967–1969: Navy
- 1964–1964: Transport
- 1964–1964: Navy

Personal details
- Born: 11 May 1905 Rio de Janeiro, Federal District, Brazil
- Died: 18 September 1985 (aged 80) Rio de Janeiro, Rio de Janeiro, Brazil
- Party: ARENA
- Spouse: Ruth Lair Rist
- Children: 6

Military service
- Allegiance: Brazil
- Branch/service: Brazilian Navy
- Rank: Admiral
- Commands: See list: Navy Armament Centre; 1st Destroyer Squadron; 5th Naval District; Director-General of Aeronautics of the Navy; Command Core of the Atlantic Defence Zone
- Battles/wars: Second World War; 1964 Brazilian coup d'état
- Awards: • Grand Cross of the Military Order of Aviz • Grand Cross of the Military Order of the Tower and Sword, of Value, Loyalty and Merit

Augusto Hamann Rademaker Grünewald (11 May 1905 – 13 September 1985) was a Brazilian admiral. Rademaker was one of the leaders of the Military Junta (30 August 1969 – 30 October 1969) that ruled Brazil between the illness of Artur da Costa e Silva in August 1969 and the investiture ceremony of Emílio Garrastazu Médici in October of that same year, elected by fellow officer generals and confirmed by the Congress. In the same occasions Rademaker was picked and "elected" as vice president for the same term as Medici's (1969–1974).

During his tenure as vice president he was awarded one of Portugal's highest honors, the Grand-Cross of the Order of the Tower and Sword on 26 July 1972. Before, in his capacity as Minister of the Navy, he was awarded the Grand-Cross of the Order of Aviz, Portugal's sole order reserved for military officials.

== See also ==
- List of presidents of Brazil

Political offices
Preceded by Hélio Cruz de Oliveira	Minister of Transport; 1964	Succeeded by Juarez Távora
Preceded by Paulo Mário da Cunha Rodrigues; Zilmar Campos de Araripe Macedo	Minister of the Navy; 1964; 1967–1969	Succeeded by Ernesto de Melo Batista; Adalberto de Barros Nunes
Preceded by Artur da Costa e Silva as President	Member of the Brazilian Military Junta; 1969; Served alongside: Lira Tavares, Márcio Melo	Succeeded by Emílio Garrastazu Médici as President
Preceded by Pedro Aleixo	Vice President of Brazil; 1969–1974	Succeeded by Adalberto Pereira dos Santos
