= Brazilian military junta of 1969 =

Government of Brazil

The three individual members of the military junta. From left to right: General of the Army Aurélio de Lira Tavares, General of the Air Force Márcio Melo, and Admiral of the Navy Augusto Rademaker.

A Military Junta or Junta Militar ruled Brazil from August 31 to October 30, 1969, between the sudden illness of President Artur da Costa e Silva and the swearing-in of Emílio Garrastazu Médici as his successor.

At that time, Brazil was in the peak of a military dictatorship, and the Brazilian Armed Forces were unwilling to allow even their civilian supporters to have any real share of power. Pedro Aleixo, Costa e Silva's civilian vice-president, should have become acting president under the Constitution of 1967, but was prevented from taking office. The Junta was composed of the three armed forces ministers: Army Minister General Aurélio de Lira Tavares, Navy Minister Admiral Augusto Hamann Rademaker Grünewald and Air Force Minister Brigadier Márcio de Souza e Mello. They ruled under the provisions of the highly repressive Fifth Institutional Act (AI-5).

== History ==
In August 1969, President Costa e Silva suffered a debilitating episode of cerebral thrombosis. The president's condition was hidden from Vice-President Pedro Aleixo (who should have become acting president under the constitution), from the press and from the Brazilian people for a few days, as the upper echelons of the Armed Forces decided what to do about the crisis. On August 31, 1969, the three armed forces ministers seized executive power, with the approval of the rest of the military elite, and issued the Institutional Act number 12 (AI-12), to formalize the establishment of a Military Junta.

The operative text of AI-12 was preceded by a proclamation to the Brazilian people. The three junta members announced that Costa e Silva was gravely ill, and that the High Command of the Armed Forces considered that the domestic situation (especially in view of the recess of the National Congress and other measures imposed by AI-5) was incompatible with the transfer of executive authority to a civilian. Accordingly, the leadership of the Government and the Supreme Command of the Armed Forces should be discharged by the armed forces ministers themselves, jointly, until the recovery of the President. Accordingly, the AI-12 declared Costa e Silva under "temporary impediment" and established that, during that impediment, the three armed forces ministers would jointly discharge all the powers and duties of the presidency.

Therefore, during the initial stage of the existence of the Military Junta, Costa e Silva legally remained President of the Republic, with the Junta discharging his powers and duties while he was incapacitated. This solution, however, was criticized even by civilian supporters of the regime, and the existence of a triumvirate was deemed potentially unstable. Also, the physicians attending the incapacitated President were of the opinion that he would never recover from the physical and mental consequences of the stroke and that accordingly he would never be able to resume the powers and duties of the office. It was also claimed that during intervals of lucidity, Costa e Silva had told military personnel and members of his family that he desired to be replaced president. The High Command of the Armed Forces also considered that a permanent replacement of Costa e Silva and Aleixo was in the interests of the regime.

Those factors led the Military Junta to issue on October 14, 1969 the Institutional Act number 16 (AI-16). By that Act, Costa e Silva was formally removed from office. The vice presidency was declared vacant as well, thus removing Aleixo from the scene. The National Congress was called out of its two-year recess, and charged with the task of electing a new President and Vice-President. In reality, the role of the Legislature (which had been purged of several opposition members under the provisions of AI-5) was merely to rubber-stamp the names chosen by the military elites that controlled the regime. The military's party, the National Renewal Alliance (ARENA), had an overwhelming majority in both houses, meaning its candidate could not have possibly been defeated even if the opposition Brazilian Democratic Movement had put forward a candidate. The elections were set to take place on October 25.

AI-16 also established that the new President and Vice-President would be inaugurated on October 30, 1969, and that their term of office would last until March 1974. AI-16 further decreed that, until the election and inauguration of the new President and Vice-President, the Military Junta would remain in place discharging the fullness of the authority of the presidency. Accordingly, the Military Junta remained in existence until the inauguration of General Emílio Médici as President of the Republic on October 30, 1969.

There was no chairman of the junta, and all official acts of the Junta were jointly signed by its three members. While General Lyra Tavares, as representative of the Army, the most powerful branch of the Armed Forces in the operation of the regime, is believed to have been the main decisionmaker within the Junta, no formal precedence was assigned to its members, so as to preserve the principle of equality of the branches of the Military. In official documents of the Junta, its members were always mentioned in the order of antiquity of each branch of the Armed Forces. Thus, the representative of the Navy was always mentioned first, followed by that of the Army, and then by that of the Air Force, which led some to believe that Admiral Rademaker was first among equals in the workings of the Junta.

The junta's most important achievement was a series of amendments to the 1967 Constitution which made it even more authoritarian than before.

== The Three Stooges ==
During the redemocratization process, the then president of the National Constituent Assembly (1987–1988), Ulysses Guimarães, a staunch opponent of the military regime, famously referred to the Military Junta of 1969 as The Three Stooges.

== See also ==
- List of presidents of Brazil,
- History of Brazil (1964-1985)

Political offices
Preceded by Arthur da Costa e Silva	Head of Government and State of Brazil; 1969	Succeeded by Emílio Garrastazu Médici
