= Battle of Maria Antônia =

Conflict between students in 1968

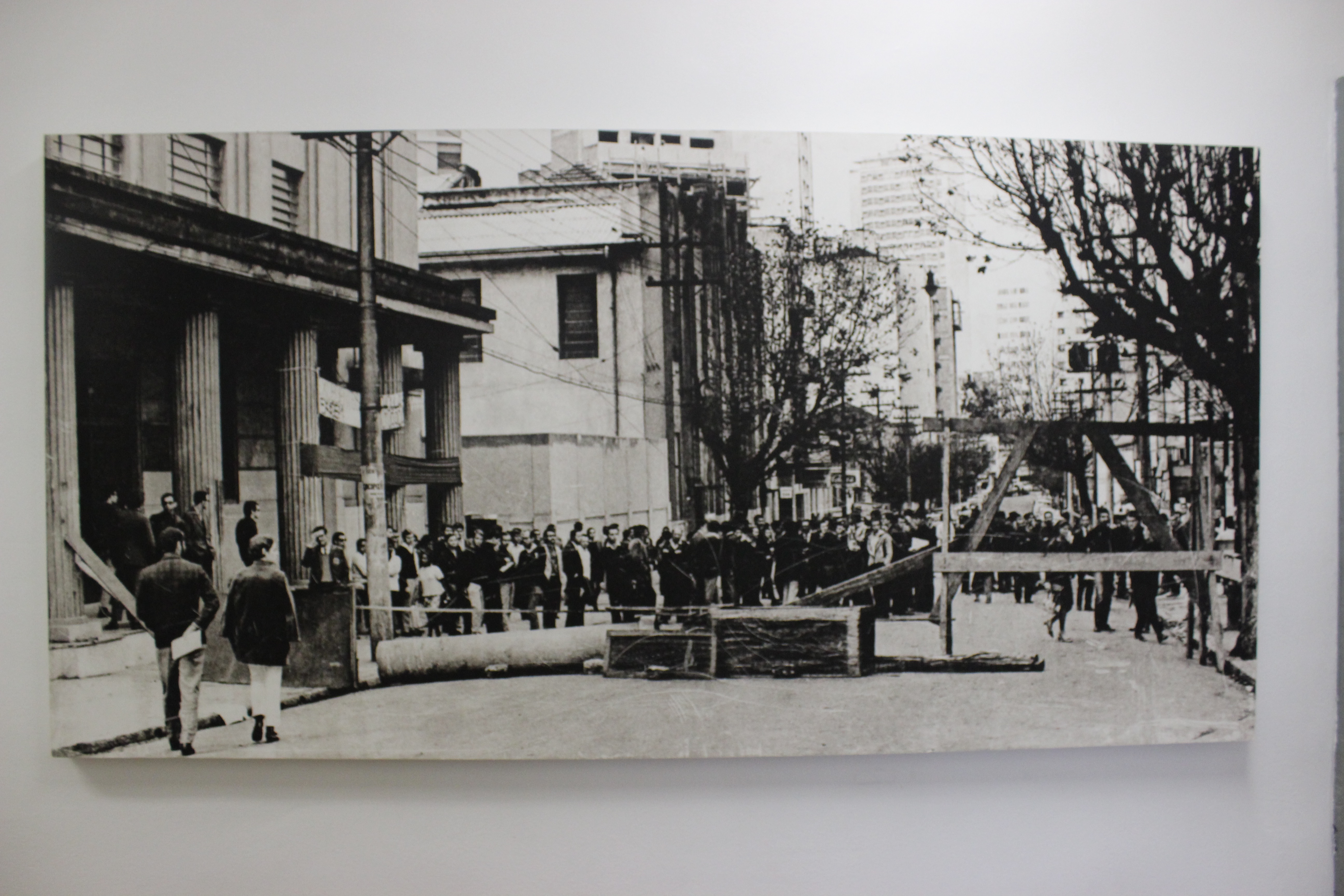
- USP students protesting against the military government in front of one of the Maria Antônia University Center
- Date: October 2, 1968
- Location: São Paulo, São Paulo; Brazil; 23°32′46″S 46°39′03″W
- Caused by: Political and ideological differences
- Goals: Annulment of the organization of the UNE congress
- Result: One dead and dozens injured Fire and subsequent transfer of USP's Faculty of Philosophy

Parties
Students from the Faculty of Philosophy, Sciences and Letters of the University of São Paulo.	Students from the Mackenzie Presbyterian University who were part of the Command for Hunting Communists (CCC)

The Battle of Maria Antônia (Portuguese: Batalha da Maria Antônia) was a conflict between students from the Faculty of Philosophy, Sciences and Letters of the University of São Paulo (FFCL-USP) and Mackenzie Presbyterian University that occurred on October 2, 1968. Both institutions were located on Maria Antônia Street, in central São Paulo, a popular venue for events such as protests and demonstrations.

== Political context ==
In 1964, the middle class in Brazil, faced with strong anti-communist propaganda and an economic crisis, supported the deposition of João Goulart expecting a quick transition to democracy. However, without any perspective of progress and confronted with a recessionary economic policy and signs of military violence, the majority of the middle class became opposed to the military regime. Their children, more than 200,000 university students and hundreds of thousands of high school students, shared the same opinion.

1968 was characterized by a period of political protest around the world. In the US, students protested for civil rights and against the Vietnam War. In France, a general strike in schools and universities weakened the government of the conservative Charles De Gaulle. In Czechoslovakia, the Prague Spring promoted the fall of the Soviet regime. In Brazil, the Bloody Friday and the March of the One Hundred Thousand in Rio de Janeiro represented the peak of popular resistance to the military dictatorship.

== The conflict ==
In the 1960s, Maria Antônia Street housed the Mackenzie Presbyterian University, whose most radical students were aligned with the Command for Hunting Communists (CCC), and the Faculty of Philosophy, Sciences and Letters of the University of São Paulo (USP), which at the time had a strong leftist movement resisting the military dictatorship. Overall, the area was a frequent location for marches and demonstrations.

Since mid-July 1968, the USP building was occupied by students who gathered constantly in assemblies. On October 3, the riot began over a toll that USP students were charging on Maria Antônia Street to pay for the congress of the National Union of Students. Angry, a student from Mackenzie University threw a rotten egg at the toll collectors, leading the USP students to hit back with stones and bricks. Some participants clashed with firecrackers, rockets, Molotov cocktails and gunshots.

On the afternoon of the second day of the conflict, José Guimarães, a student at the Marina Cintra High School in São Paulo, was shot in the head during the confrontation. The USP students, wearing José's bloodied shirt, occupied the streets of São Paulo and confronted the authorities. At the end of the conflict, the police invaded the USP and Mackenzie buildings and arrested dozens of students, who protested with barricades, nails for the police car tires and marbles to knock over the cavalry.

According to the magazine O Cruzeiro of November 9, 1968, Boris Casoy (journalist and RedeTV! anchor), João Marcos Monteiro Flaquer, João Parisi Filho, Raul Careca and Souvenir Assumpção Sobrinho were present at the conflict on Maria Antônia Street.

== Outcomes ==
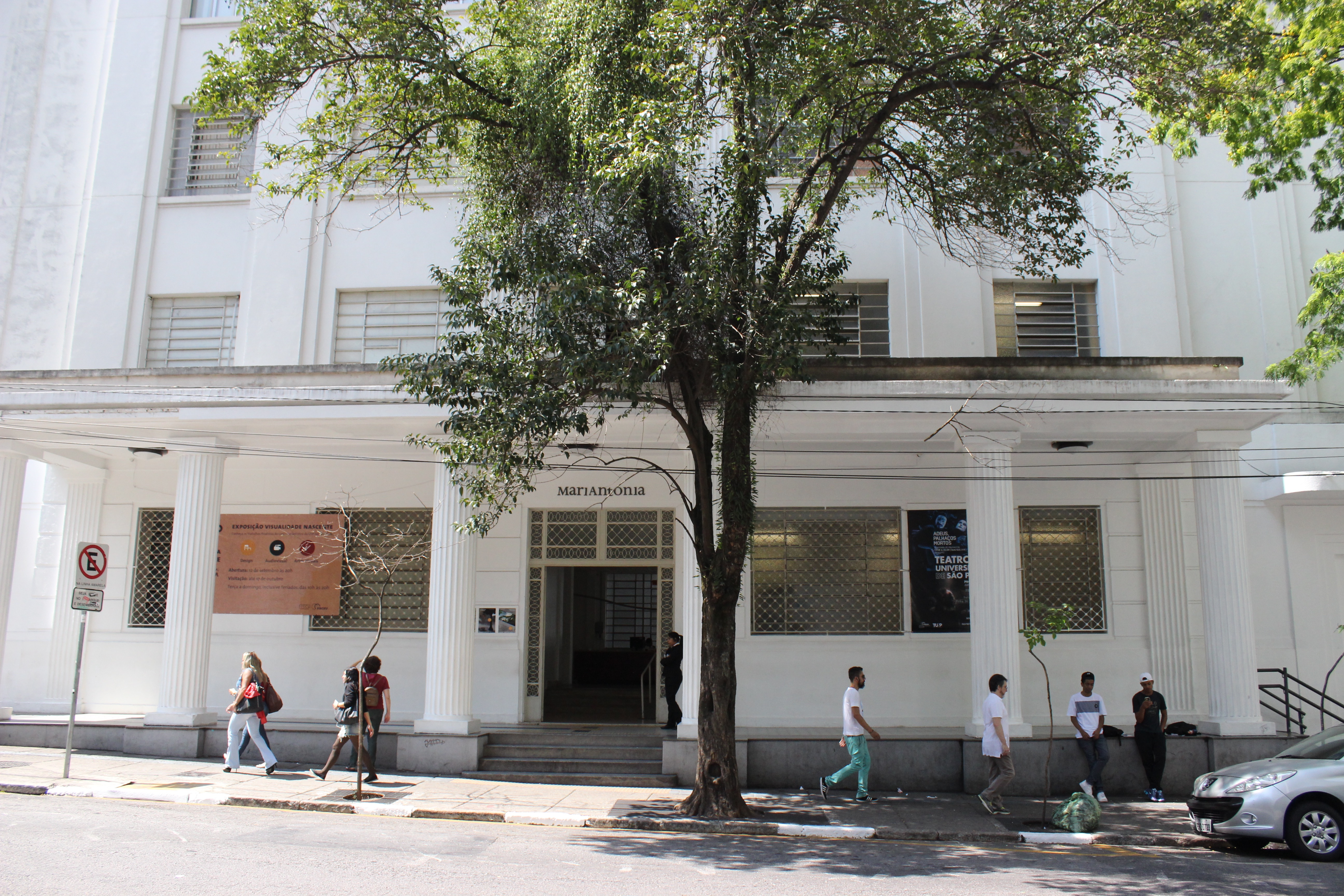
Facade of the Maria Antônia University Center.

The Battle of Maria Antônia was one of the pretexts for the government to enact the Institutional Act number 5, which removed opposition parliamentarians from office, closed the National Congress, intervened in municipalities and states, suspended constitutional rights, censored the press and institutionalized torture as an instrument of state repression. AI-5 remained in force until December 1978, but its impact on Brazilian society remains to this day. The event also influenced the transfer of USP courses from the campus on Maria Antônia Street to the Armando de Salles Oliveira University Campus in the Butantã neighborhood, whose construction was already in progress. The relocation ruptured the student movement.

In 1993, the building returned to USP and now houses the cultural space Maria Antônia University Center, dedicated to discussions and new experiences in culture, art and human rights. Mackenzie University maintained its campus on the same site. According to the Grupo Tortura Nunca Mais (English: Torture Never Again), José Carlos Guimarães, the student who died during the confrontation, was murdered by Osni Ricardo, a member of the CCC and a police informer. The Battle of Maria Antônia inspired retired police officer Marcos Gama to write the novel Vila Buarque: O Caldo da Regressão, published by Alameda in 2017.

According to Professor Antonio Candido de Mello e Souza, the conflict made USP transition from a neutral attitude to an organized movement concerned with the social problems of the time. At the time, USP was already starting a political debate on national issues, as the founding foreign professors had left and the academic staff began to include an absolute majority of Brazilians.

In 2023, the film A Batalha da Rua Maria Antônia, based on the 1968 conflict and directed by Vera Egito, won the Redemptor Trophy for Best Fiction Film at the 2023 Rio de Janeiro International Film Festival.

== Further allegations ==
According to Paulo Azevedo Gonçalves dos Santos' testimony in the book Ensaios de Terrorismo by Gustavo Esteves Lopes, the CCC was organized by students at the Faculty of Law of the University of São Paulo, specifically João Marcos Monteiro Flaquer, in 1962, within an academic group known as the Partido do Kaos (English: Kaos Party). Records show that the CCC was established at Mackenzie Presbyterian University due to its location, at the time, opposite the Faculty of Philosophy, Sciences and Letters of the University of São Paulo. Left-wing movements were also very present at Mackenzie University, especially in art-related courses such as architecture, whose students strongly resisted several attacks. One of the most important moments was when the CCC invaded, vandalized and spray-painted hate messages on the DAFAM (Mackenzie Architecture Faculty Directory), a basement space where students hid.

== See also ==
- Maria Antônia University Center
- March of the One Hundred Thousand
