= March of the One Hundred Thousand =

Coordinates: 22.9100°S 43.1756°W

Passeata dos Cem Mil
- March of the One Hundred Thousand; Part of resistance to the military dictatorship in Brazil
- Date: 26 June 1968
- Location: Rio de Janeiro
- Goals: Redemocratization and the end of military rule
- Methods: Manifestations, protest and marches

The March of the One Hundred Thousand (Portuguese: Passeata dos Cem Mil) was a manifestation of popular protest against the Military dictatorship in Brazil, which occurred on June 26, 1968, in Rio de Janeiro, organized by the student movement and with the participation of artists, intellectuals and other sectors of Brazilian society.

== Prelude ==
As student protests against Brazil's military dictatorship became more commonplace, the government often responded with beatings and arbitrary arrests. Police repression reached its peak in late March 1968 with the invasion of the university restaurant "Calabouço" (Dungeon), where students protested against the rising price of meals. During the raid, the commander of the troops of the PM, aspiring Aloisio Raposo, killed student Edson Luís de Lima Souto, 18 years old; he was shot in the chest.

Word of this event moved across the country, serving to inflame passions. In the wake of the student, the confrontation with police occurred in various parts of Rio de Janeiro. In the following days, protests ensued in the city center, all suppressed with violence, culminating in the mass of the Candelária church (April 2), when the horse soldiers assaulted students, priests and reporters.

In early June 1968, the student movement began to organize an increasing number of public demonstrations. A march, which ended at the Palace of Culture, resulted in the arrest of the student leader Jean Marc van der Weid. The next day, the movement met at Federal University of Rio de Janeiro to organize protests and demand the release of Jean and other students arrested, but the result was the arrest of 300 students at the end of the assembly.

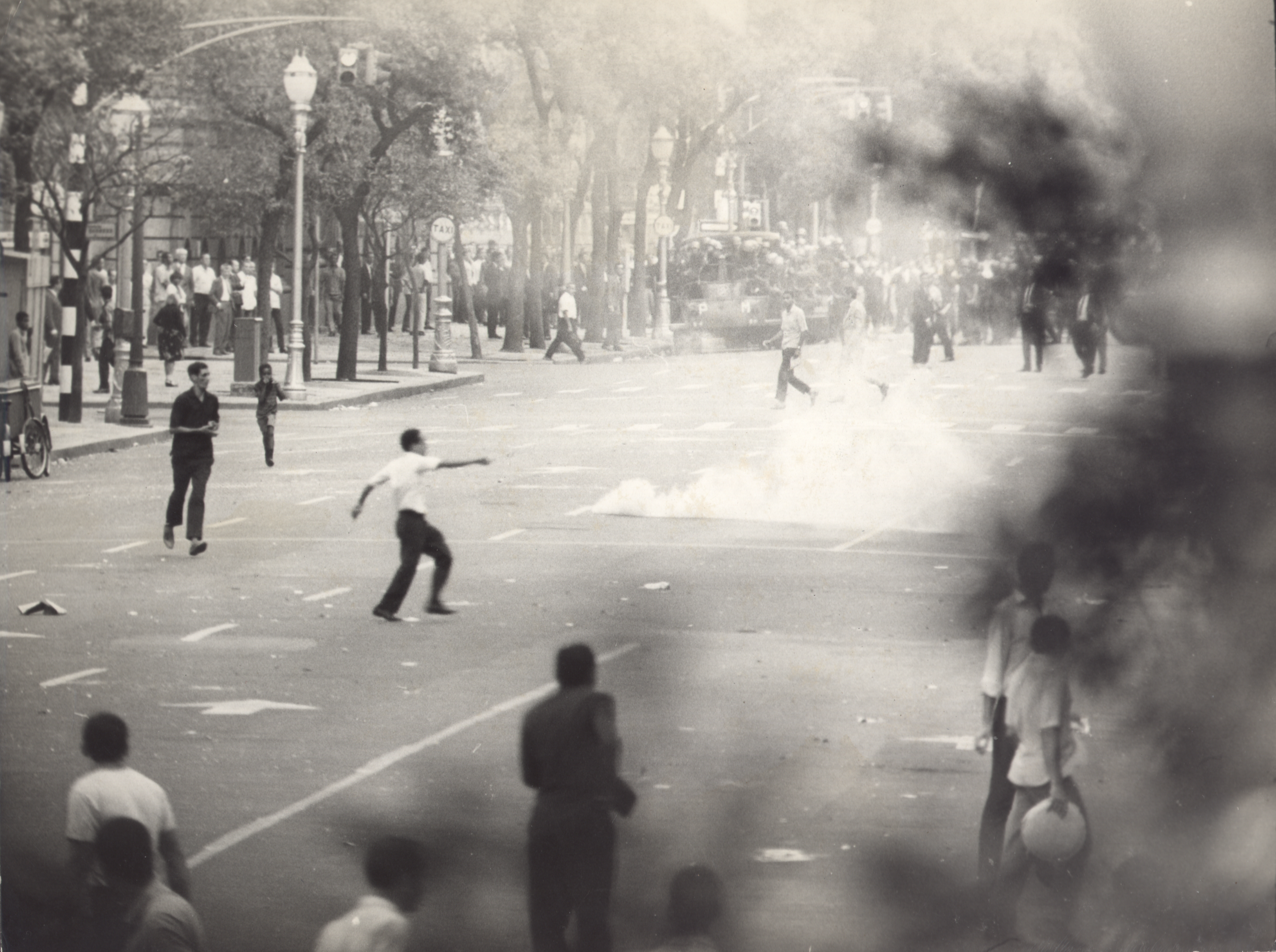
A scene from Rio de Janeiro June 21, 1968—sexta-feira sangrenta 'bloody Friday.'

Three days later, a student demonstration in front of the U.S. embassy, sparked a conflict that ended with 28 dead, hundreds injured, a thousand prisoners and 15 police cars burned. That day became known as sexta-feira sangrenta "Bloody Friday".

Given the negative press from the incident, the military ended up allowing a student demonstration, scheduled for June 26. According to General Louis France, ten thousand policemen were ready to take action if necessary.

== The march ==
Early in the morning, participants of the march already took to the streets of the neighborhood Cinelândia, in downtown Rio de Janeiro. The march began at 14:00, with about fifty thousand people. An hour later, that number had doubled. In addition to students, also artists, intellectuals, politicians and other segments of Brazilian civil society swelled the march, making it one of the largest and most significant demonstrations in Brazilian history.

Passing in front of the Candelaria Church, the march stopped to listen to a speech by student leader Vladimir Palmeira, who remembered the death of Edson Luis and demanded an end to the military dictatorship.

Led by a huge band with the words "Down with the Dictatorship. The people in power", the march went on for three hours, ending in front of the Legislature without conflict.

== See also ==
- Battle of Maria Antônia
