= Command for Hunting Communists =

Brazilian paramilitary group

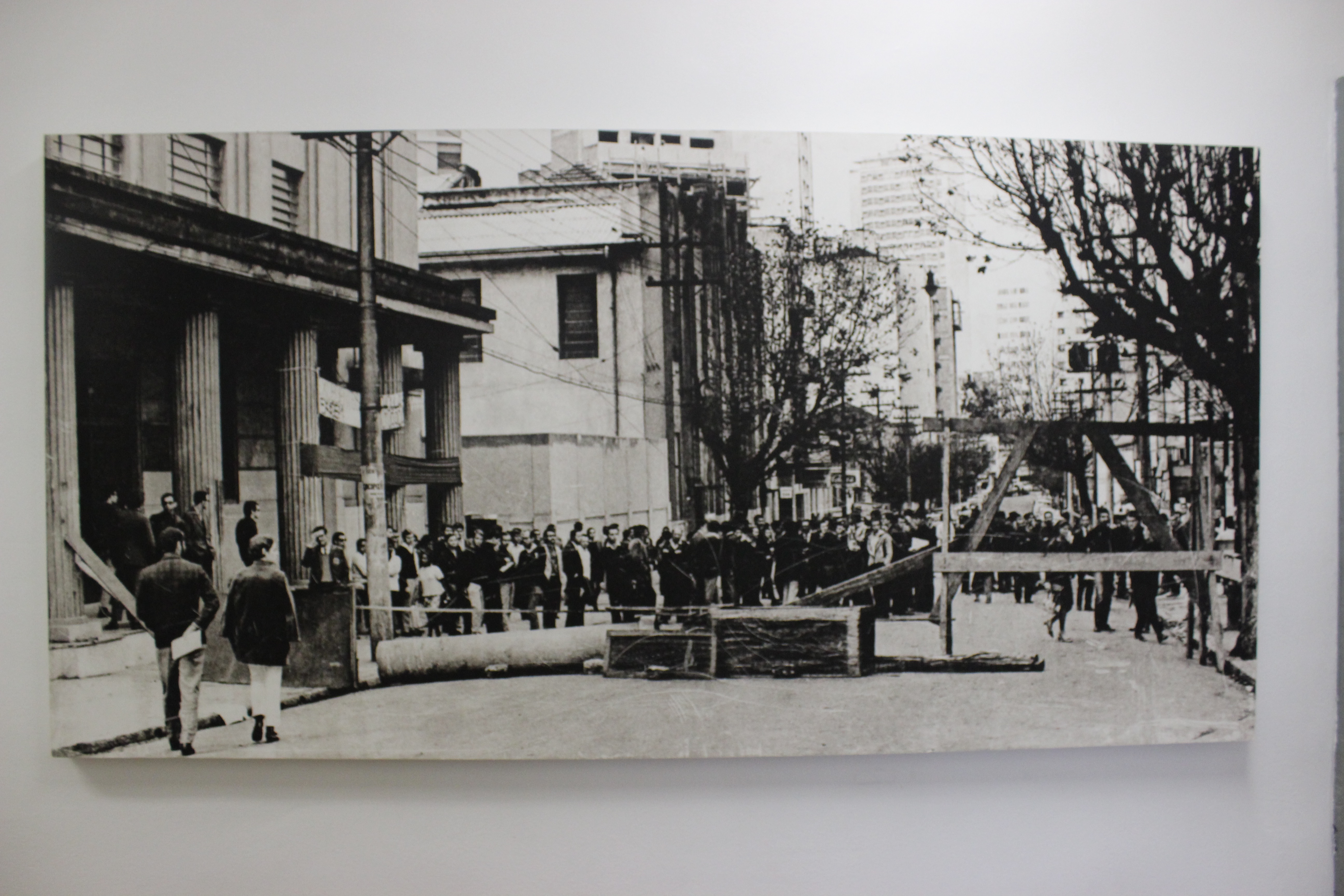
Maria Antônia street

The Command for Hunting Communists (Portuguese: Comando de Caça aos Comunistas, CCC) was a far-right paramilitary anti-communist group active in Brazil during the first years of the military dictatorship (1964–1985).

== Activities ==
The CCC, in the mid-1960s, began as an informal organization of rightist university students who allegedly monitored leftist students, or anyone they deemed to be a communist. It also enlisted police officers and intellectuals favorable to the military regime.

When the military coup took place, the Rádio MEC, a state-owned broadcasting station in Rio de Janeiro, was invaded and destroyed by CCC members. The CCC was held responsible for torching the Rio headquarters of the National Union of Students (União Nacional dos Estudantes, UNE, in Portuguese), an organization usually deemed left-leaning by right-leaning individuals and groups.

The CCC was involved in the events known as Conflito da Rua Maria Antônia ("Maria Antônia street skirmish") in 1968, among students of the Mackenzie University and University of São Paulo, Brazil's leading public university — in which one student died.

As a paramilitary group, the CCC became known to the general public when it staged attacks on leftist personalities outside the university. What most provoked public remarks was the invasion of the Ruth Escobar Theatre in São Paulo on July 18, 1968, where they assaulted the cast members of Chico Buarque's play Roda Viva. Among them was actress Marília Pêra, who was hit with rubber truncheons and fled naked into the street, alongside other members of the female cast. According to the same source, the CCC was responsible for a bomb attack on the Opinião Theatre in Rio de Janeiro on December 2 of the same year and for kidnapping, torturing and murdering Antônio Henrique Pereira Neto, a Catholic priest of Recife and aide of archbishop Helder Câmara, on May 26, 1969.

== Military backing and demise ==
The military government, at the end of 1968, dissolved habeas corpus and could arrest citizens arbitrarily. Brazilian repressive institutions such as the DOI-CODI held the power of life and death over anyone. Paramilitary groups such as CCC thereby lost their raison d' étre and ceased their actions.

== See also ==
- ABIN (Agência Brasileira de Inteligência) - Present Brazilian Intelligence Agency
- DOI-CODI (Destacamento de Operações de Informações - Centro de Operações de Defesa Interna) - Brazilian Intelligence Agency during Military Dictatorship
- Maria Antônia University Center
