= Márcio Moreira Alves =

Brazilian journalist and politician

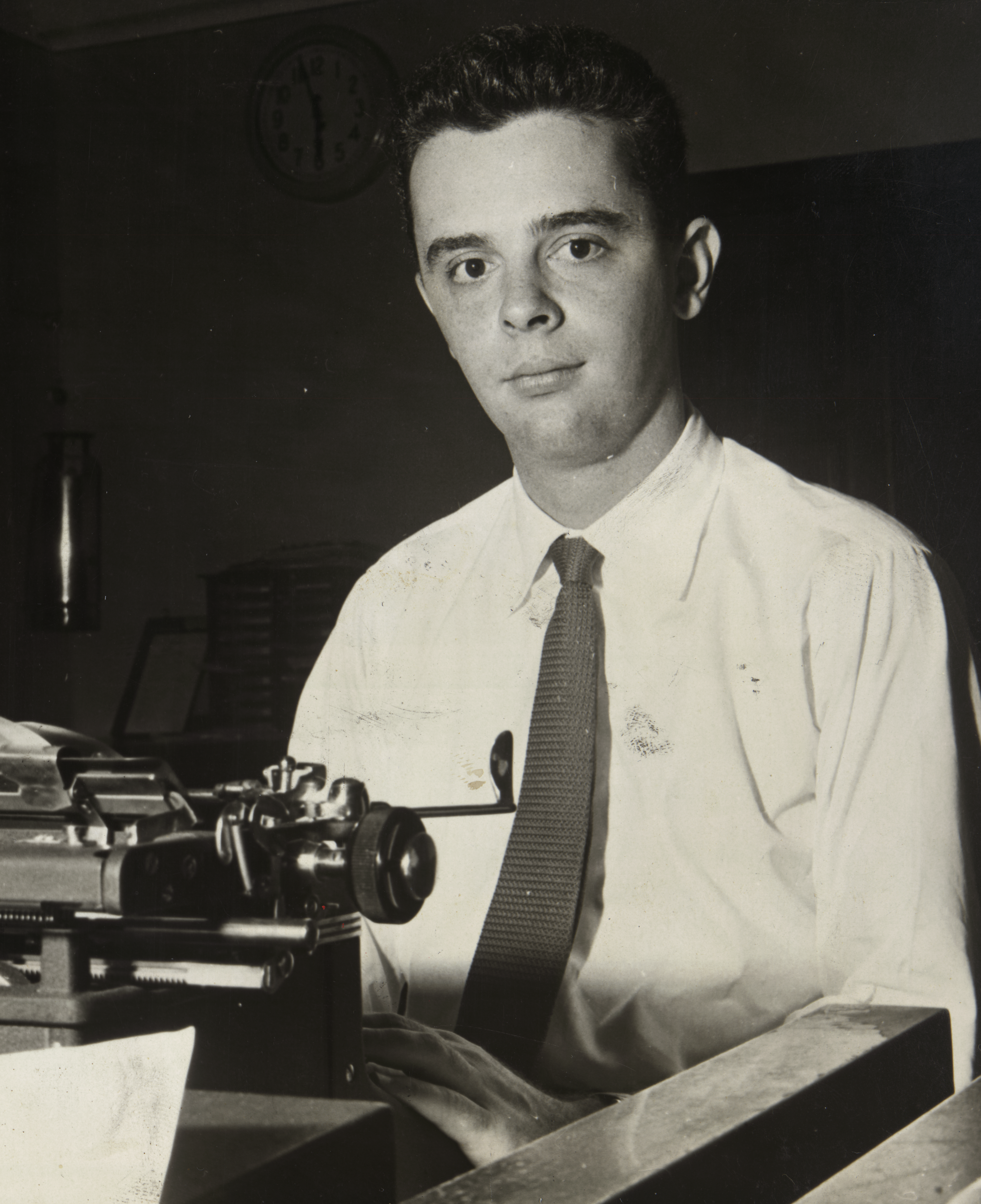
- Márcio Moreira Alves

Federal Deputy for Guanabara
- In office February 1, 1967 – December 13, 1968

Personal details
- Born: July 14, 1936 Rio de Janeiro, Federal District, Brazil
- Died: April 3, 2009 (aged 72) Rio de Janeiro, Rio de Janeiro, Brazil
- Party: MDB (1966–1968); PMDB (1982–1990)
- Spouse: Marie Breux Moreira Alves
- Education: Law School of Guanabara State University (current Rio de Janeiro State University); Sciences Po
- Occupation: Journalist and politician

Márcio Emanuel Moreira Alves (July 14, 1936 – April 3, 2009) was a Brazilian journalist and politician.

== Early life ==
Márcio Moreira Alves was born in 1936; his father was the former mayor of the city of Petrópolis Márcio Honorato Moreira Alves. His family owned the Ambassador Hotel in Rio de Janeiro, where Juca's Bar, a meeting place for intellectuals and politicians in the 1960s, operated.

Marcito, as he was known, began his career in journalism at the age of seventeen as a reporter for the newspaper Correio da Manhã and was awarded the Esso Journalism Award for his work on the political crisis in Alagoas in 1957. Between 1958 and 1963, he attended the Law School of the Guanabara State University (current UERJ). He was an advisor to the Minister of Foreign Affairs between 1961 and 1962, San Tiago Dantas.

== Political activism ==
A member of the opposition to the government of President João Goulart, Marcito first supported the 1964 military coup d'état. However, he began to oppose the military regime enforced by the coup after the publication of the Institutional Act Number One (AI-1) and began to lead a strong campaign denouncing the practice of torture against political prisoners in Brazil.

In 1965 Marcito participated in a demonstration promoted by intellectuals and students in Rio de Janeiro in front of Hotel Glória, where the Council of the Organization of American States met; Marshal Humberto Castelo Branco, Brazilian military dictator, was at the meeting. There was a demonstration and the DOPS, the political repression unit, arrested several personalities. Márcio Moreira Alves had not been arrested, but soon ran after the police car and demanded to follow with his fellow protestors.

In October 1967, he participated in the parliamentary commission that visited political prisoners in Juiz de Fora and found eleven victims of torture carried out by military personnel operating inside Brazilian Army barracks. It was the third year of Moreira Alves' fight against torture, denouncing General Ernesto Geisel as "in league with a bunch of sadists"

Marcito was remembered as the motivator of the Institutional Act Number 5 (AI-5), when he, as a deputy, delivered a speech at the National Congress in early September 1968 calling for a boycott of the celebrations of Brazil's Independence Day and asked Brazilian girls not to date Army officers. Due to the perceived radical tone of his speech, the Minister of Justice, at the time, sent to the Chamber of Deputies a request for authorization for Mr. Márcio Moreira Alves to be sued. This was too much even for the pro-military National Renewal Alliance (ARENA), which dominated the legislature; it refused to grant the authorization.

The government's reprisal was strong and on December 13, 1968, Institutional Act Number Five was issued, considered the hardest institutional act edited during the Brazilian military dictatorship It gave the president the power to close Congress, rule by decree and suspend citizens' rights. Márcio was immediately expelled from Congress under provisions of the AI-5 and left the country clandestinely in December 1968, exiling in Chile, where he stayed until 1971. In 1971, he went to Paris, where he obtained a doctorate from the National Foundation for Political Sciences. In 1974, he moved to Lisbon, where he stayed until 1979. With the arrival of the Amnesty Law, which pardoned all political crimes and allowed the return of political exiles, in 1979 Márcio returned to Brazil and began to collaborate until 1986 with the newspaper Tribuna da Imprensa.

== After the exile ==
With the end of the two-party system, he joined the PMDB, successor to the former MDB, and ran for a seat of federal deputy for Rio de Janeiro in November 1982, leaving as a substitute. Between 1982 and 1986, he advised Luís Carlos Bresser Pereira during the period in which Bresser was president of the State Bank of São Paulo and secretary of the government of São Paulo. In 1987, he was undersecretary of international relations for the state of Rio de Janeiro, under the government of Wellington Moreira Franco. He left public life in 1990 when he left the PMDB and started to focus on journalism. He was a commentator for TV Manchete and columnist for the newspaper O Globo until 2008, when he retired from health care after suffering a stroke in October 2008.

== Death ==
Márcio Moreira Alves died on April 3, 2009, at the age of 72, after five months in which he was hospitalized at Hospital Samaritano in Rio de Janeiro, victim of multiple organ failure and renal and respiratory failure.

== Books ==
- O Cristo do Povo, Sabiá, 1968.
- Un grano de mostaza (El despertar de la revolución brasileña). Premio Casa de las Américas, 1972
- Sábados Azuis: 75 Histórias de Um Brasil que Dá Certo, 2000
- Gostei do Século: Crônicas, 2001
- Brava Gente Brasileira: Crônicas, 2001
- 68 Mudou o Mundo, 1993
- Histórias do Brasil Profundo: Crônicas, 2003
