= Maria Antônia University Center =

University of Sao Paulo Sector

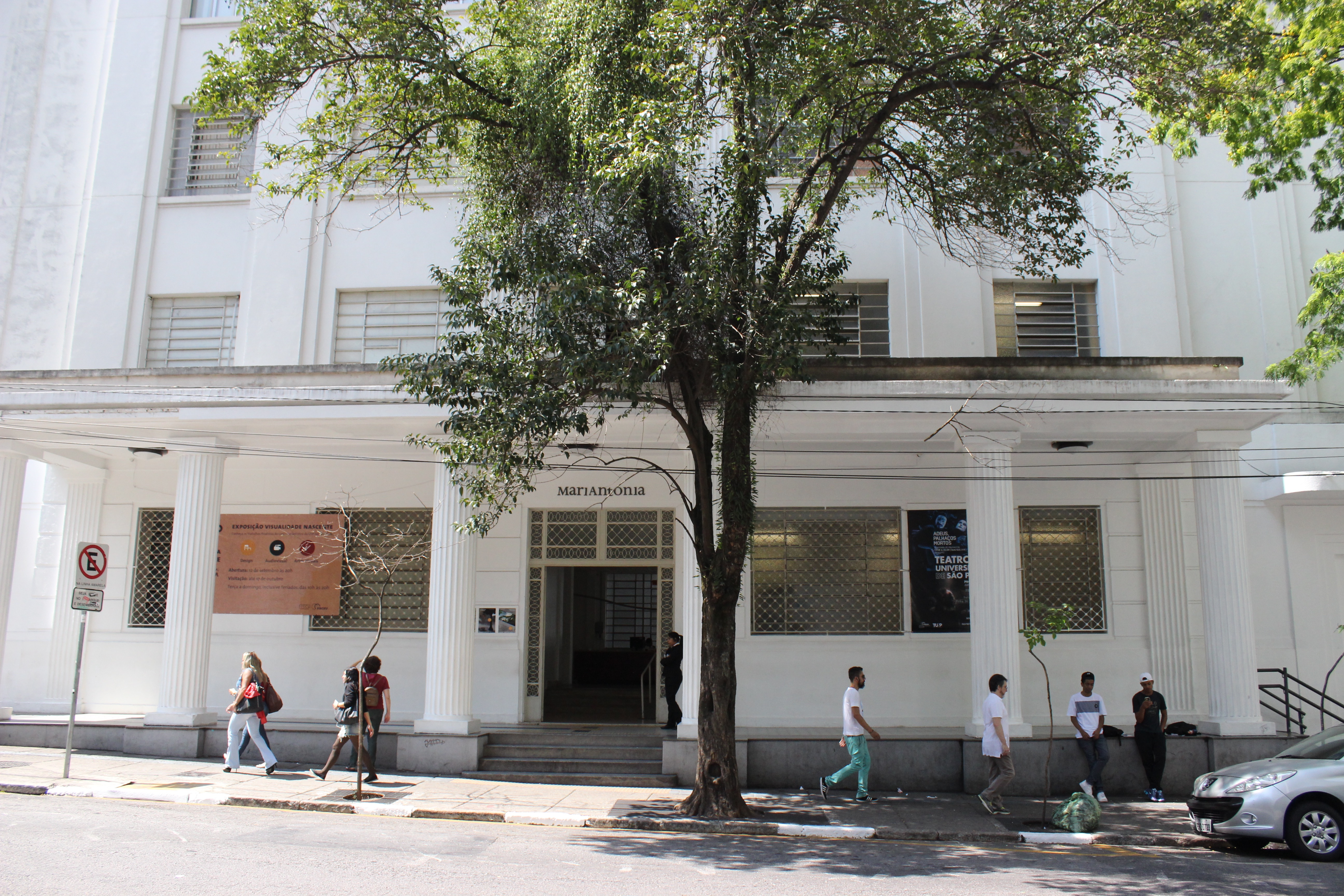
- Established: 1949
- Location: São Paulo; Brazil
- Coordinates: 23°32′45.9″S 46°39′3.697″W

The Maria Antônia University Center is an organ of the Pro-Rectory of Culture and University Extension of the University of São Paulo, which promotes modern and contemporary art exhibitions, courses in the field of humanities, seminars, debates, and other events, with emphasis on the dialogue between the different artistic languages. Maria Antônia, as it is known, occupies the former headquarters of the School of Philosophy, Sciences, and Languages of the University of São Paulo, along with the USP Theater, in a complex of buildings classified as the city's historical heritage.

The Maria Antônia is considered a relevant point to spread the production of the University of São Paulo in its many levels and a space for the exchange of knowledge produced inside and outside the university. The complex offers several didactic activities, among them: courses, seminars, workshops in engraving, photography, drawing, and painting.

The São Paulo Biennial Foundation and the Institute of Architects of Brazil awarded the University Center's renovation and restoration project in the Non-Executed Institutional Category of the Votorantim Architecture Award - General Architecture Exhibition, developed by the architecture office UNA Arquitetos.

== History ==
=== Liceu Nacional Rio Branco ===
The complex of buildings on Maria Antônia Street was built in 1930, originally to serve the Liceu Nacional Rio Branco, at the request of teacher and school principal Antônio de Sampaio Dória, who reserved the top floor of the building to be his residence.

The idea for the creation of the educational institution happened during a meeting on September 25, 1926, at Savério Cristófaro's house, attended by Antônio de Sampaio Dória, Roldão Lopes de Barros, Almeida Júnior, Lourenço Filho and Guilherme Merbach. They saw the Liceu as a way to put into practice a method of teaching considered innovative, as advocated by Antônio de Sampaio Dória and Lourenço Filho. The school was attended by the upper class of the population, children of farmers and traditional Brazilian families. Initially, the building's headquarters was on Dr. Vila Nova Street, and from the beginning it served as a boarding school. Later, to expand the facilities, the building on Maria Antônia Street was acquired. In this facility there were laboratories, library, sports court, swimming pool, auditorium, besides special facilities, such as dormitories and cafeteria.

In their method of education, the goal was moral and civic formation, as well as knowledge of the natural sciences. For this, the students' daily routine included learning to read, write, and calculate, as well as developing mental practices, the ability to observe, imagine, and conclude. Besides these aspects, health care, through physical activity and hygiene skills, was also included.

=== School of Philosophy, Sciences and Languages ===
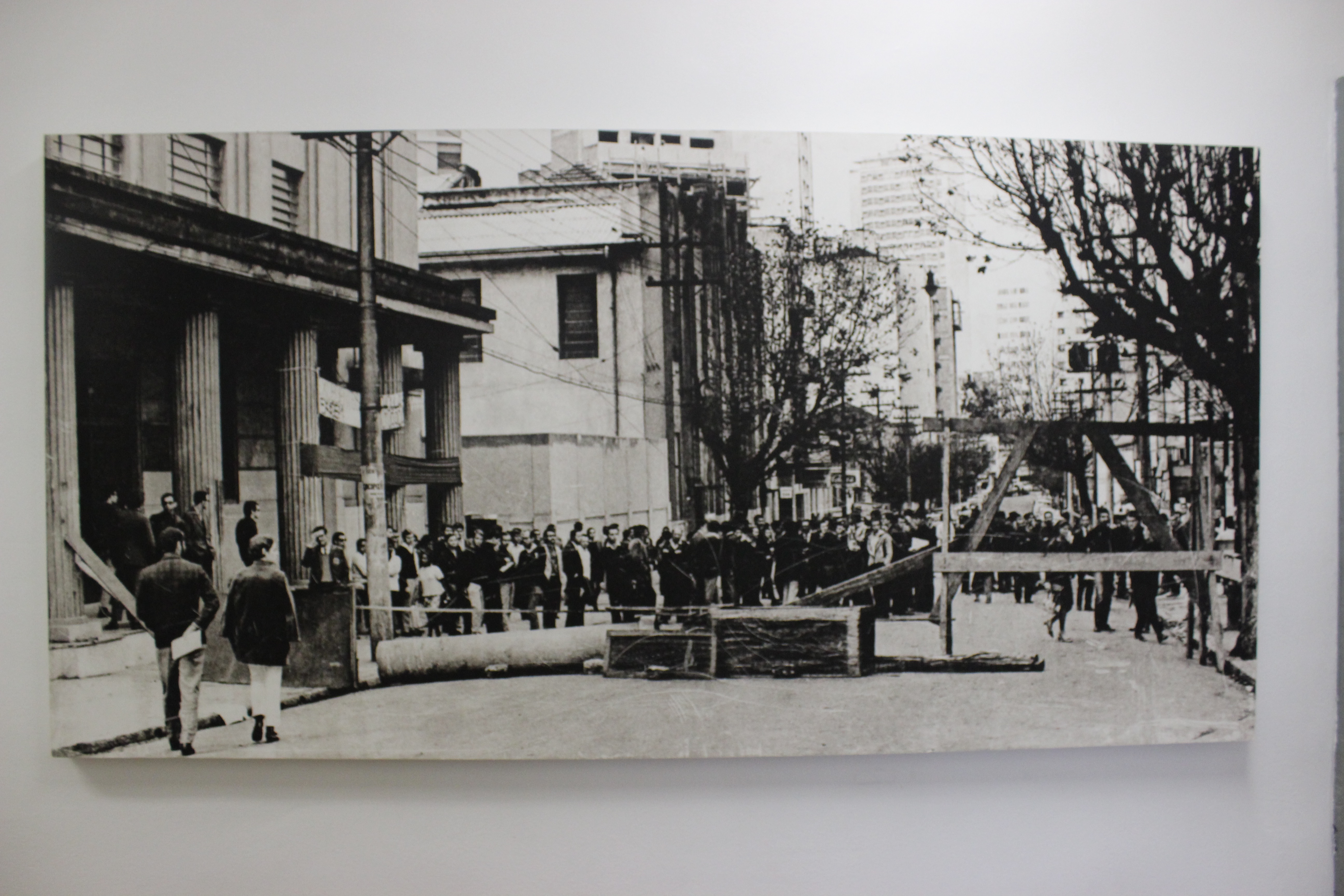
Photo from a group in front of the building during the ditatorial period.

After having occupied several addresses in the city of São Paulo, such as Glete Alley, Brigadeiro Luiz Antônio Avenue and República Square, the rectory of USP acquired the buildings located at Maria Antônia Street in 1949. The headquarters of USP's School of Philosophy, Sciences and Letters (FFCL) was installed in the Rui Barbosa building. The faculty was given the name Maria Antônia by the student movement, due to the new address.

The Vila Buarque neighborhood, where the new headquarters had been located, was composed of several educational institutions such as the School of Architecture and the School of Economics, both from USP, as well as Mackenzie Presbyterian University, the School of Sociology and Politics and the Armando Álvares Penteado Foundation. The city center was seen as a university campus and the USP's School of Philosophy, Sciences and Letters was the political and cultural pole of the region.

From 1949 to 1968, the time when the USP's faculty operated in the building, many of the main Brazilian personalities taught and studied at the institution, in many fields of politics, culture, and science, such as former president Fernando Henrique Cardoso, sociologist Florestan Fernandes, and many others.

The building has a high cultural and political significance, because during the military dictatorship in Brazil, instated in 1964, the space was the arena of resistance of the student movement, which fought for the restoration of democracy. In 1968, between October 2 and 3, there was a real confrontation in which all kinds of weapons were used: bricks, revolvers, Molotov cocktails, and tear gas bombs. The conflict was called the Battle of Maria Antônia, and involved students from the Faculty of Philosophy, Sciences and Languages at USP, considered politically left-wing, and members of the Command for Hunting Communists, considered politically right-wing, infiltrated at Mackenzie University. The Command for Hunting Communists group was formed by students and policemen, and some of them received military training and carried guns. They acted with the intention of preventing the advance of communism and the political left in Brazil.

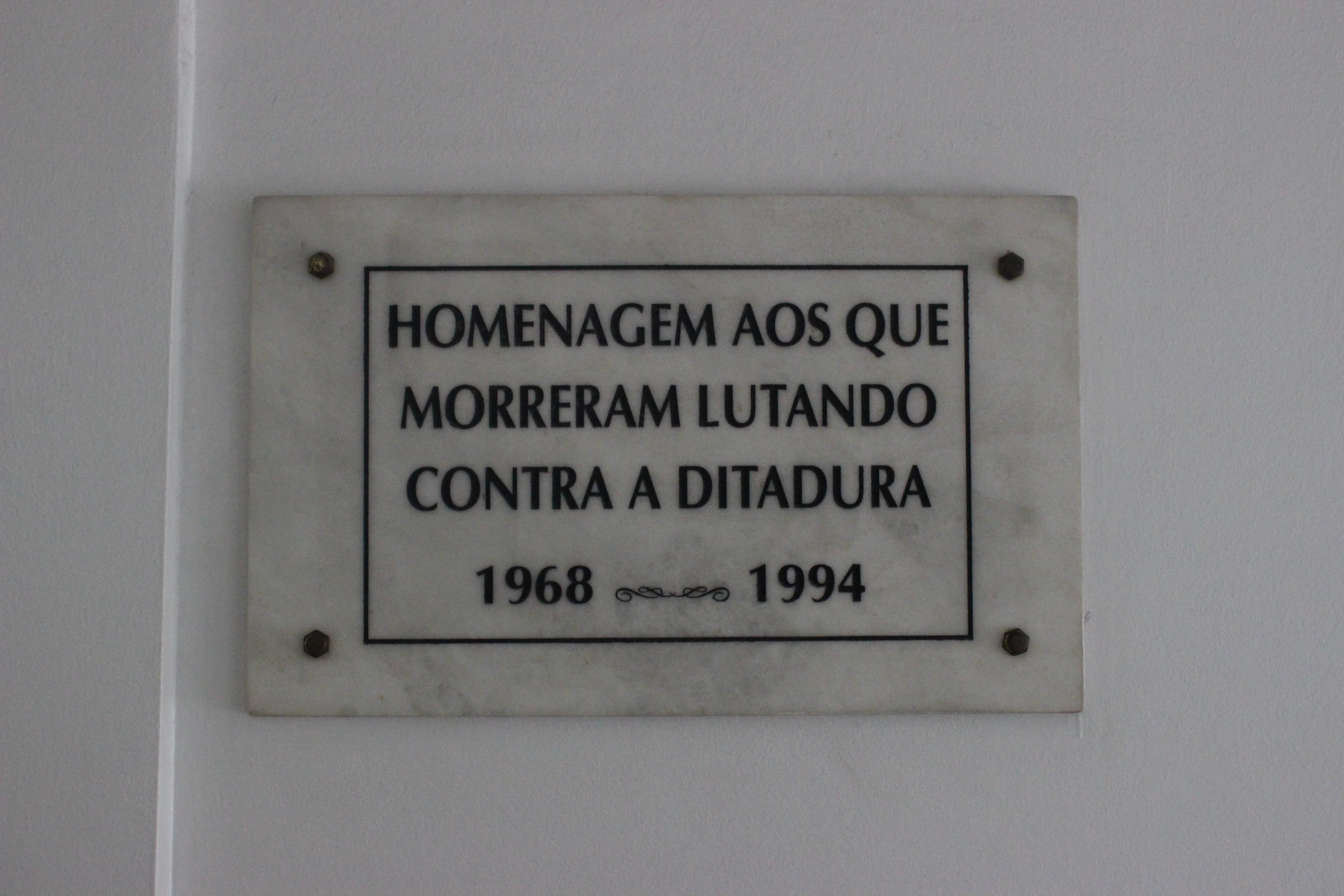
Tribute to the people who died fighting in the ditatorial period.

During the conflict, student José Guimarães, 20, was the victim of a bullet fired from Mackenzie's premises and attributed to a member of the Command for Hunting Communists. There was also an invasion and depredation of the building. In the midst of the confrontation, the property was violently taken over by police forces. The students inside the building were arrested and the facility was ordered locked down. The School was then transferred to the campus of College Town, in Butantã, and the buildings were given another use by the State Government. The Joaquim Nabuco building, for example, was given to a sector of the prison administration. In the 1970s, the Rui Barbosa building became home to the Board of Trade of the State of São Paulo.

In 1985, the main building was declared a National Heritage Site by CONDEPHAAT - Council for the Defense of Historical, Archaeological, Artistic and Tourist Heritage - because of its historical importance. Since 1991, the buildings of the complex have been given back to USP. The main property was reopened in 1993 as Maria Antônia University Center, with the purpose of creating a center for discussion and new experiences in the field of culture, art, and human rights. In 2012, the Joaquim Nabuco building, which also belonged to USP, began to host the exhibitions of the Maria Antônia University Center. As a result, USP was once again playing an active role in the center of São Paulo, from which it had been expelled during the harshest years of the military dictatorship. The building in the entrance hall maintains a memorial plaque in honor of those who died fighting against the dictatorship.

== Historical and cultural significance ==
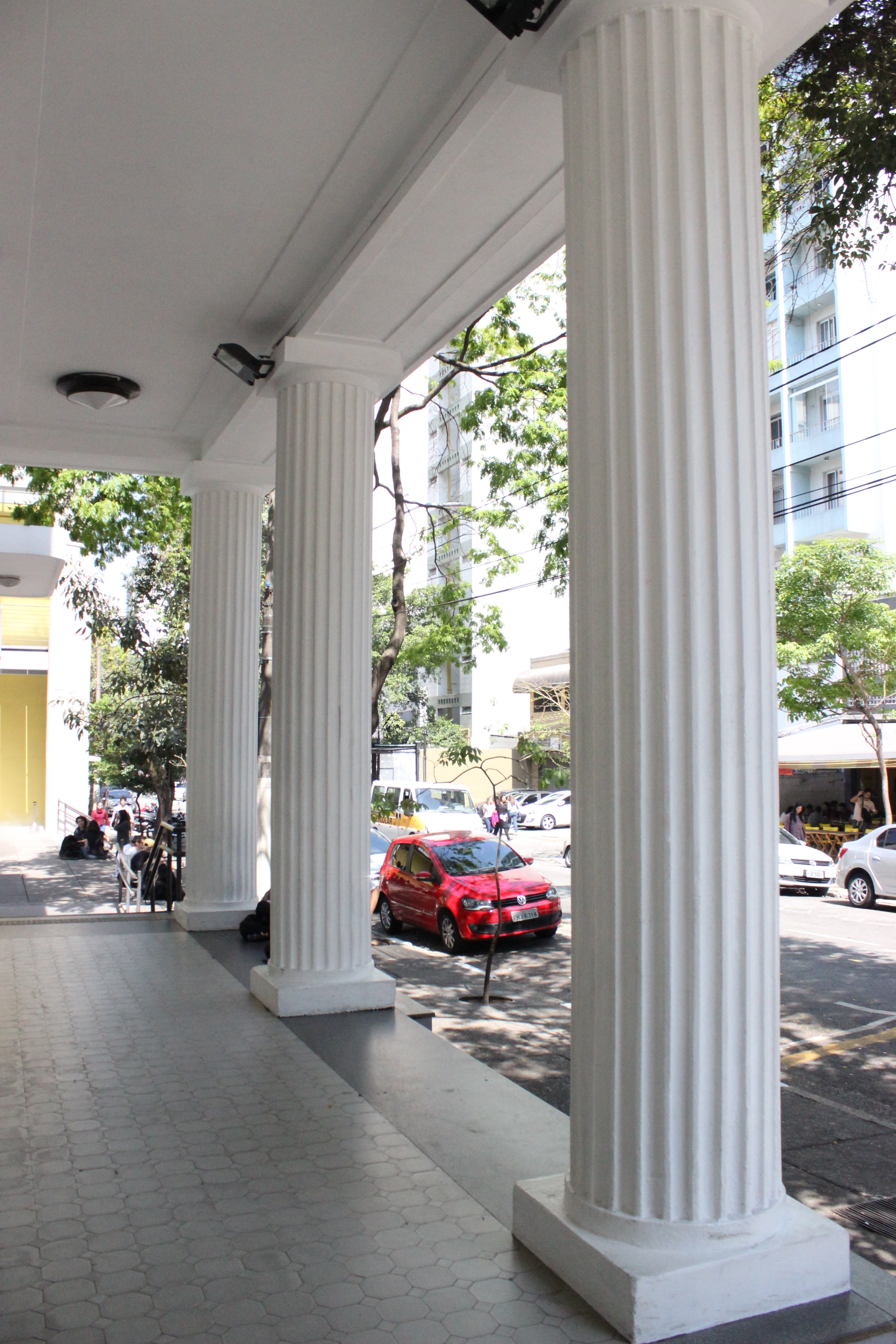
Pillars of the University Center entrance.

The building has a total area of 5,800 square meters. It consists of five floors and basements, with an L-shaped floor plan. The main facade faces Maria Antônia Street, which is symmetrical and distinguished by the six columns that support the building's marquee. The facilities were built with functionality in mind, so they present a simpler design. The Maria Antônia University Center is not considered an asset of architectural relevance.

The conservation process started in 1985, at the request of the Historical Heritage Department of the Municipality of São Paulo, and was made effective in 1988 by CONDEPHAAT, which is the agency responsible for conservation in the state of São Paulo. Later, in 1991, it was registered by Conpresp, which is responsible for registration at the municipal level.

The building's preservation is planned because of its political and cultural importance. The property is a landmark in the reorganization of education that has been proposed since the 1930s, besides being the stage for the student movement in opposition to the dictatorship in the 1960s, a nucleus of intellectuals defending freedom of thought and resistance to the dictatorship, and the headquarters for the USP's academic community's struggle on behalf of popular sectors.

== Maria Antônia nowadays ==
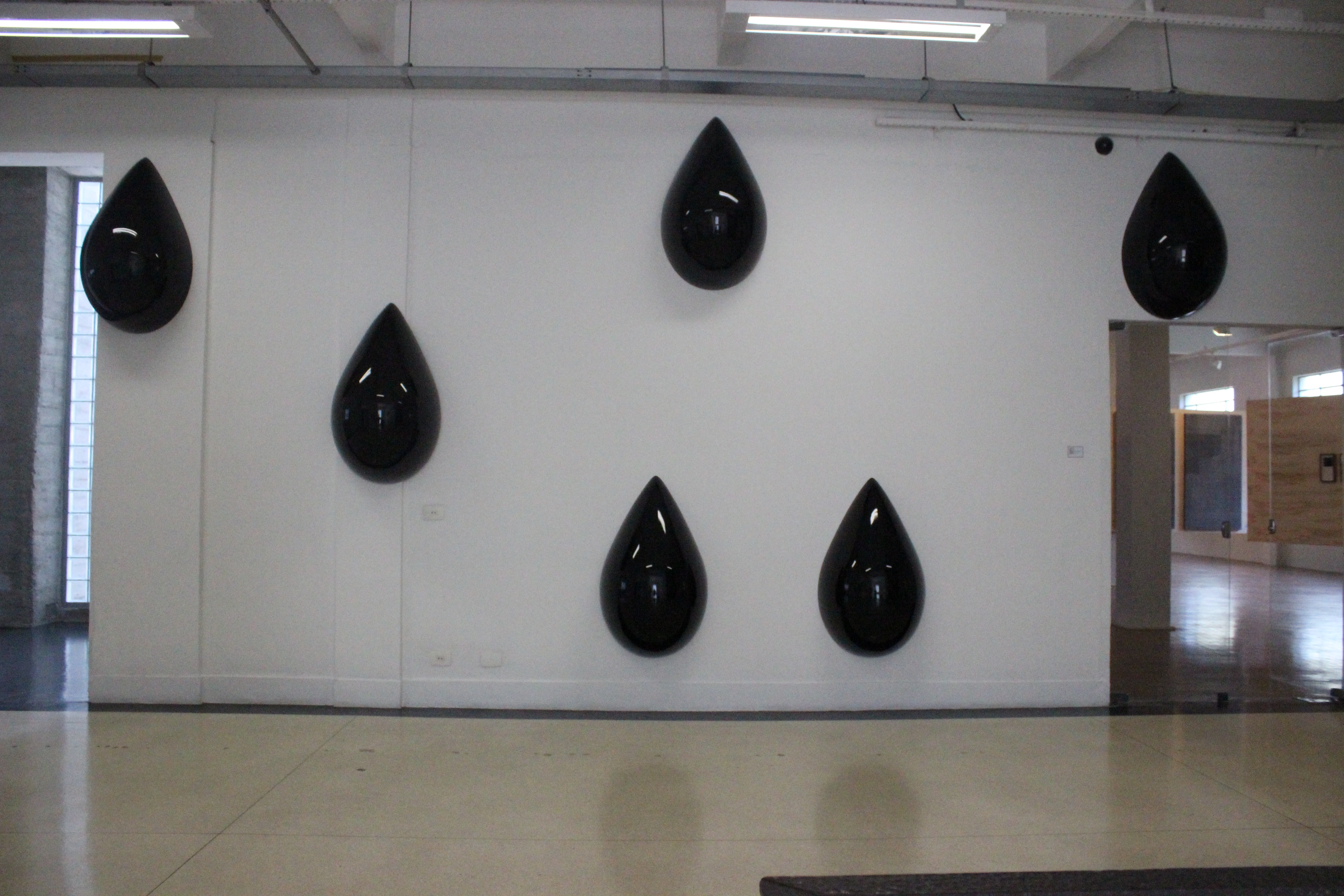
Exhibition on the second floor of the Maria Antônia University Center.

Since 1999, the Maria Antônia University Center has been open to various cultural manifestations. Each year, it establishes an average of 20 art expositions to be exhibited. These exhibitions include contemporary artists from different periods and styles, techniques and aesthetic currents, who already have some background and experience in the industry, but find it difficult to exhibit in commercial galleries or group shows, giving space to plurality. Maria Antônia also hosts retrospective and architecture shows that aim to discuss the recent past of Brazilian art. The space open to art seeks to give visibility and stimulus to artists and also to young authors, post-graduates and graduates from USP, who are responsible for producing the texts that accompany the exhibitions. Consequently, the display of works happens in parallel with research and critical reflection on art and the work of its study and mediation team, which develops projects to attend public schools and spontaneous visits to the exhibitions.

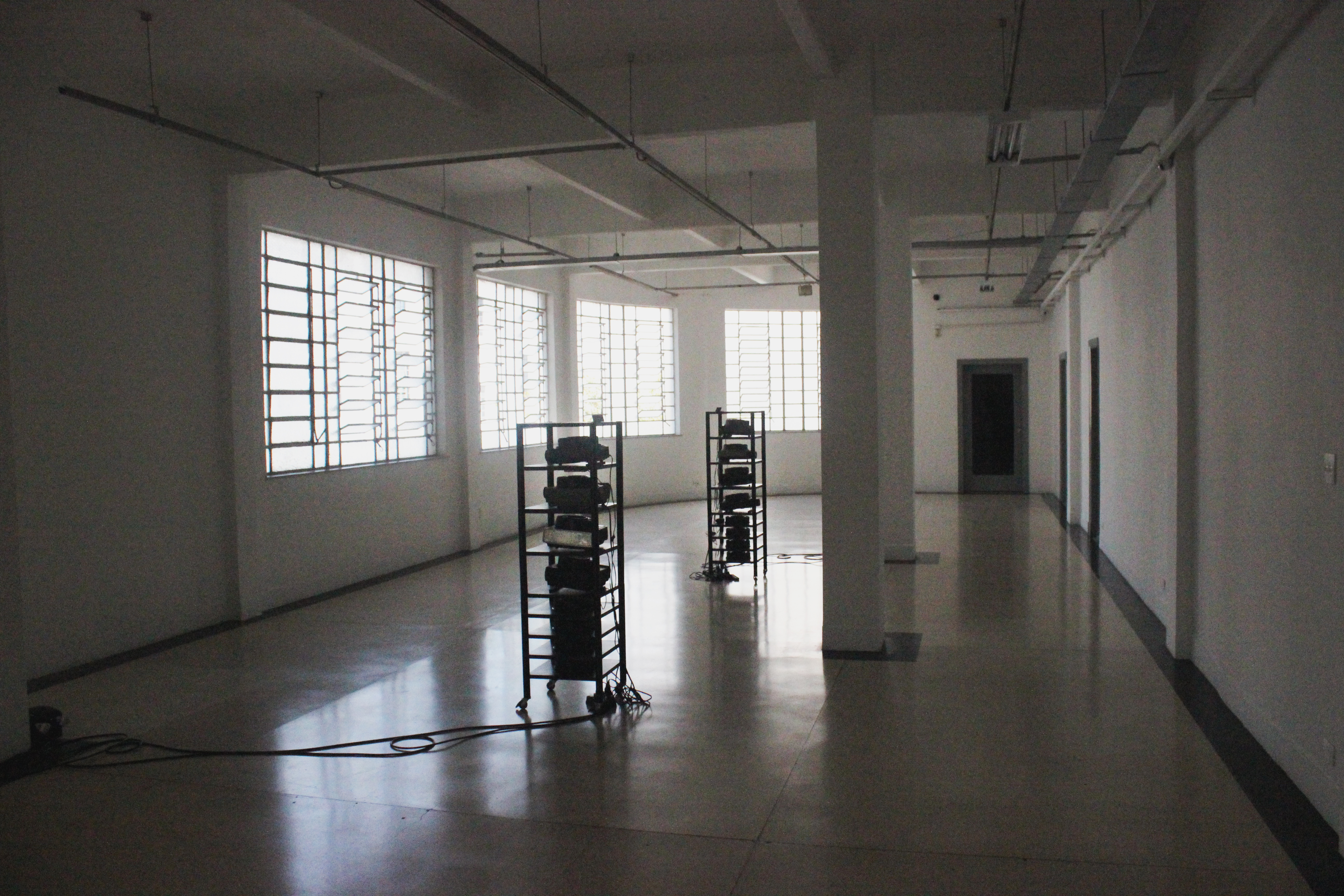
Exhibition on the first floor of the Maria Antônia University Center.

Currently, Maria Antônia develops its schedule in the Rui Barbosa and Joaquim Nabuco buildings. In twenty years of operation, the institution has established itself as a center of cultural reference in the city, carrying out diversified activities oriented towards a comprehensive concept of education. The center has exhibition spaces, auditoriums and classrooms, in which it hosts modern and contemporary art shows, music presentations, film screenings, courses, seminars and debates. It also includes the Gilda de Mello e Souza Library, with a bibliographic collection and wide documentation in various media, generated by its own multidisciplinary activities, and the USP Theater (TUSP), which hosts plays by the TUSP Group and several other companies.

The program includes activities aimed at the educational and cultural revitalization of the city, especially in the central area. Among these activities are those aimed at training teachers from the municipal and state schools, which are done through partnerships with other institutions and public agencies. The Rui Barbosa building also houses non-governmental organizations, such as the Brazilian Society for the Progress of Science and the School of Government. Strategically located in the central area of São Paulo, in an area of great concentration of cultural and educational institutions, the Maria Antônia University Center serves a very diversified public.

== Restoration ==
The restoration was supported by the university - through its Pro-Rectory of Culture and University Extension - and by partnerships with the Ministry of Culture, the State Secretariat of Education and several private companies, in addition to the Association of Friends of the Maria Antônia University Center. The associates receive several benefits, such as discounts and priorities in several activities.

The restoration and renovation process started in 2002 and was in the responsibility of the company UNA Arquitetos, which sought to maintain the historical characteristics of the building. A contemporary art nucleus composed by the Maria Antônia University Center, the USP Theater and the Institute of Contemporary Art (IAC) became part of the building. The idealization of the project sought to maintain the public character that marked the history of the Maria Antônia University Center.

The modifications promoted occurred on the main facades, which according to UNA Arquitetos, proposes a new relationship of the complex with the city. The free space between the Rui Barbosa and Joaquim Nabuco buildings was opened as a leisure area and another public space. The square, at street level, connects the buildings. At the lower level, the varied activities of both buildings seek to be connected through the wooded courtyard, which is also used for theatrical presentations. The changes in the Joaquim Nabuco Building were made in order to give the space an exhibition function. To this end, the wooden floors were replaced by metal modules capable of supporting loads. The theater, which remained underground, was designed to be a flexible theater.

== Gallery ==
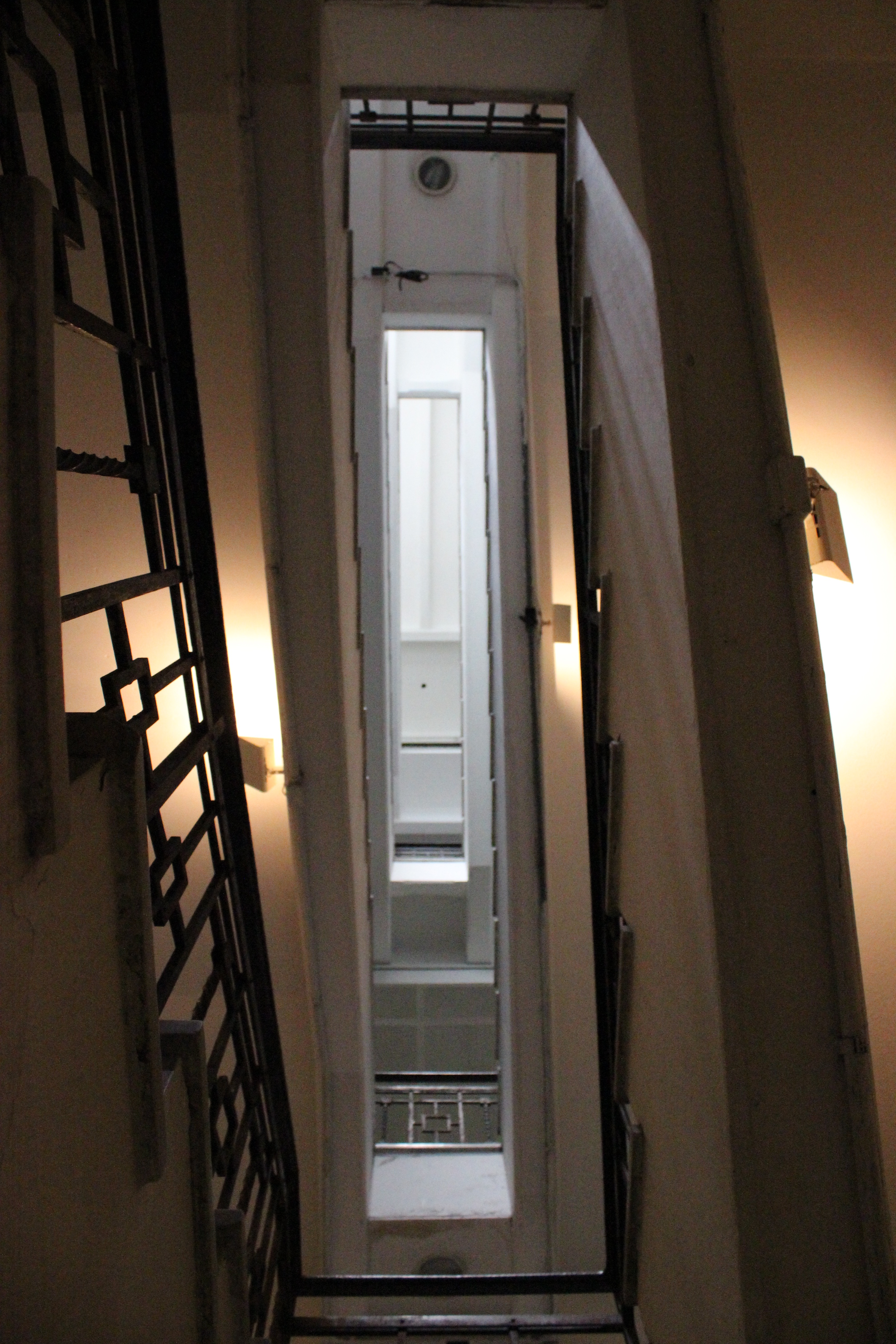
Maria Antônia University Center Staircase.

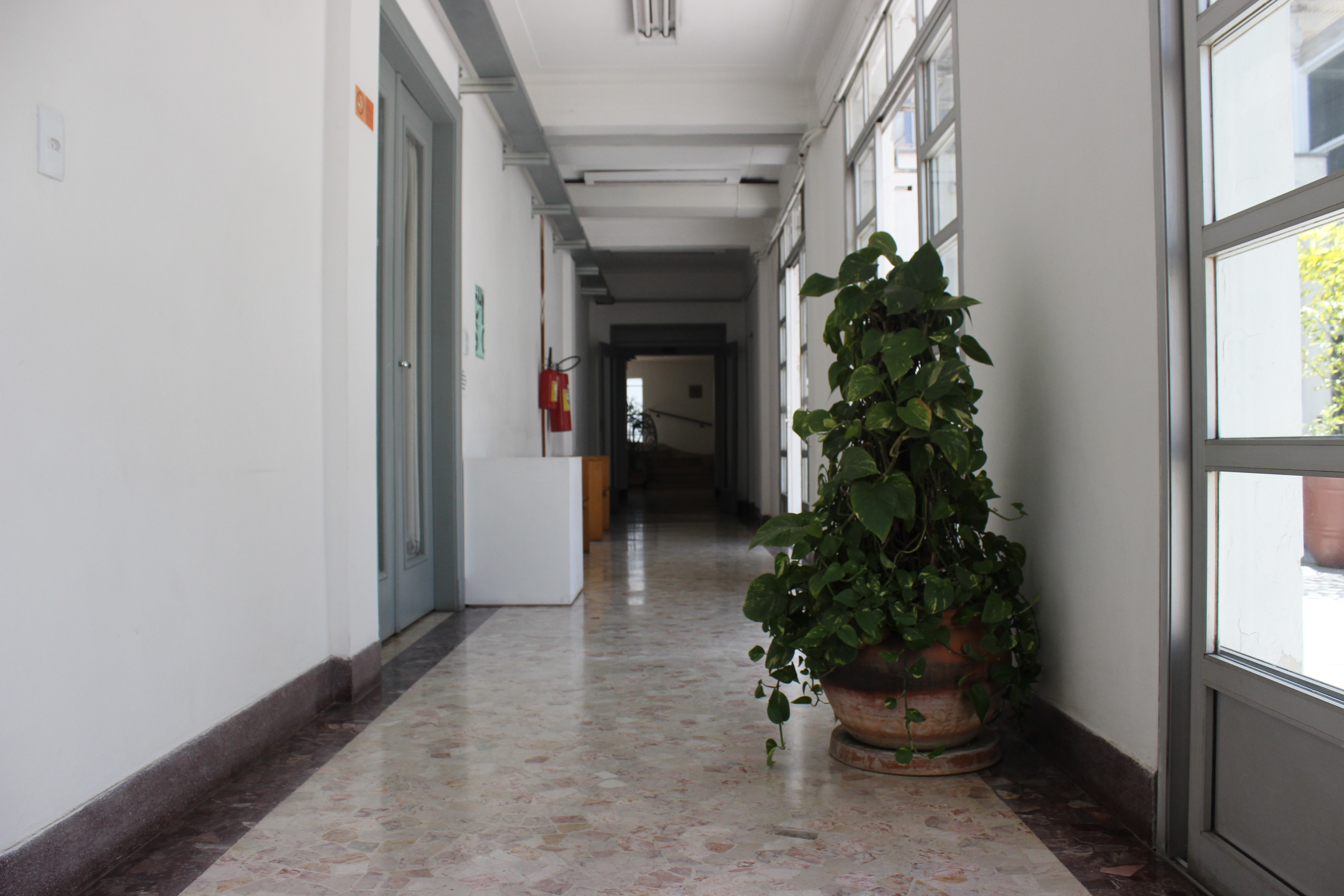
Hallway on the floor of Antônio de Sampaio Dória's residence.

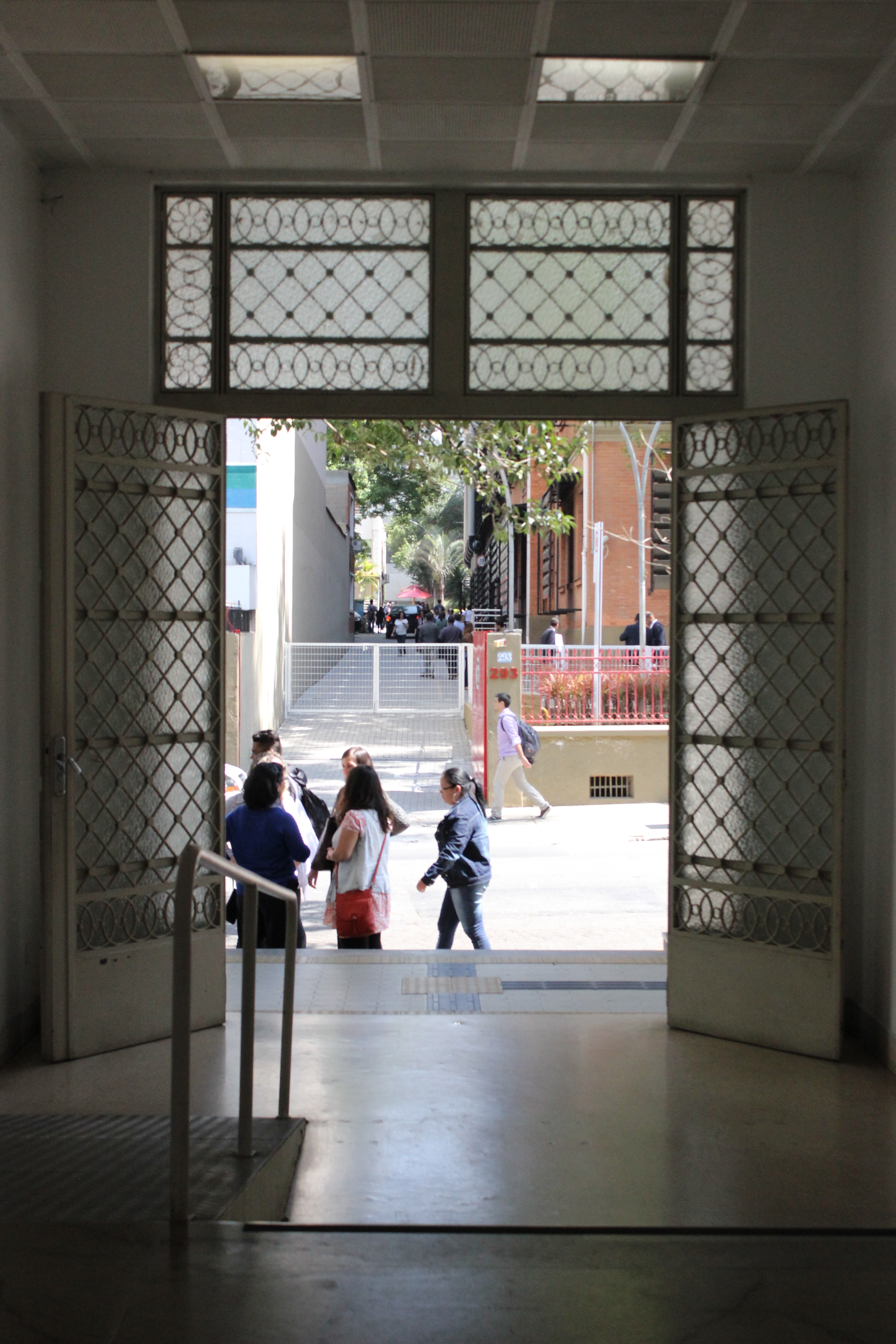
Maria Antônia University Center's main door

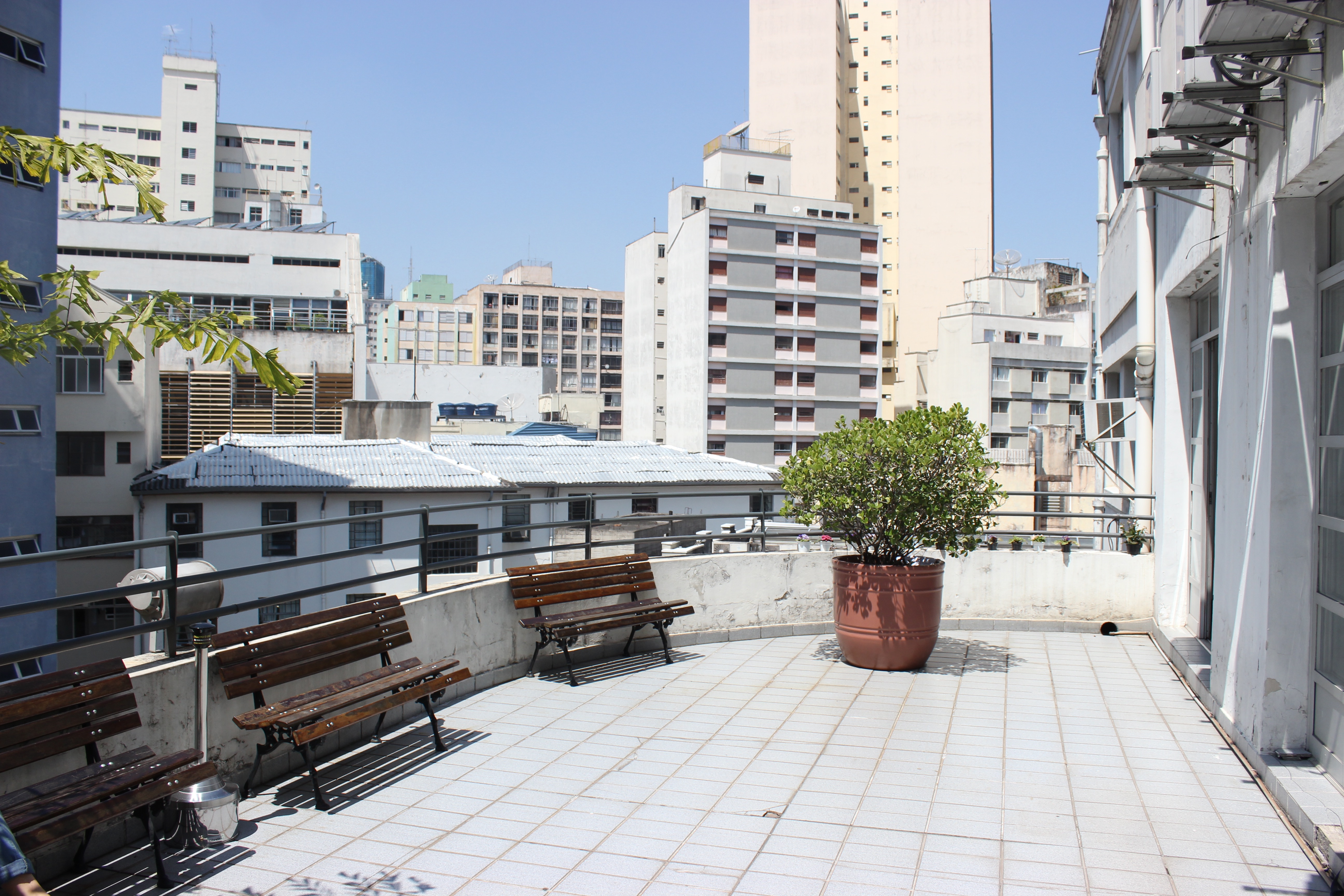
Maria Antônia University Center's Balcony.
