= 1960s Brazilian student movement =

In the early 20th century, students enjoyed relative prominence in Brazilian political activities and in 1937 established the National Union of Students (Brazil), known as the UNE. In the late 1950s, the UNE became increasingly leftist as Brazil's political situation became more polarized. The Brazilian military dictatorship that came to power after a coup in 1964 directly challenged students' rights to political activity. The government's anti-democratic policies and attempt to suppress student political activity incited mass student mobilization in protest of the dictatorship. As student demonstration increased, the government escalated its repression of protestors. Police and students repeatedly engaged in violent clashes. The student movement peaked in 1968 when students engaged in intense national protests, strikes, and occupied universities. The government increasingly arrested and tortured students and professors suspected of being leftist or associated with communist groups. By the end of 1968, the government passed legislation that eliminated the ability of students to contest the government and ended the student movement.

== Political background and UNE formation ==
During the First Brazilian Republic, Brazilian students enjoyed relative political authority within Brazilian society. Because students were primarily male and children of Brazil's economic and political elite, the government viewed their education and political activism as preparation for their future roles as Brazilian leaders.

Throughout the early 1900s, students had the freedom to participate in political movements specific to student issues, Brazilian politics, and international politics, such as U.S. intervention in Panama. After a military coup in 1930, Getúlio Vargas assumed the presidency, his policies had an effect on student political mobilization. The Vargas administration began to expand Brazil's university system and mandated the formation of officially recognized student organizations at each university that allowed the students the right to politically organize. Inspired by Vargas policies, students launched an effort to create a student organization that operated nationally.

In 1937, Brazilian students held a national conference at which they voted to establish the National Union of Students (Brazil), known as the UNE, which was a democratic student organization run by elected representatives from universities throughout Brazil. The formation of the UNE allowed Brazilian students more political mobility than before and gave them political autonomy from their parents and university administration. Throughout the 1900s, the UNE was primarily a leftist organization, but due to its democratic nature, periodically shifted its political alignment depending on its elected leaders and the Brazilian political climate. At times, its policies aligned with socialist agendas but it also experienced a brief conservative shift in the 50s.

By 1955, however, the UNE was decidedly leftist and organized several national strikes throughout the latter half of the 1950s and early 60s, including a national strike against high trolley fairs, a strike against strict entrance exams to the universities, and a push to democratize university leadership.

== Transition to student political repression ==
In the early sixties, the attitude toward student political mobilization changed. In the wake of the Cuban Revolution, and given the global political climate of the Cold War, conservative political forces began to fear the emergence of revolutionary groups within Brazil. They feared that leftist organizations, including the Brazilian Student Movement, were being infiltrated by communist revolutionaries.

Student political mobilization became viewed as a threat to Brazil's internal national security. At the same time, student organizations were also inspired by the reforms of the Cuban Revolution. Student movements in Brazil became more radical as they pushed for policies modeled after the Cuban example such as agrarian reform and literacy campaigns.

With the radicalization of the student movement came conservative movements aimed at curbing student political power. These conservative organizations promoted the narrative that by being politically active, students were not fulfilling their roles as actual students, and also furthered the narrative that foreign communists infiltrated organizations like the UNE. These organizations coupled their disdain for leftist movements with criticisms of the left-leaning president, João Goulart, who was pushing for liberal reforms and whose liberal policies were blamed for inciting the growing radicalization of youth. In the final months of 1964, tensions within Brazilian society were high as Brazilian society became sharply divided between the right and the left.

== Student resistance under the military dictatorship ==
On March 13, 1964, Goulart passed a law that nationalized Brazilian oil companies and established an agrarian reform initiative. With discontent growing in response to these liberal reforms, the military staged a coup and overthrew Goulart on March 30 with U.S. approval. The military claimed the 1964 Brazilian coup d'état was meant to protect Brazil from destabilization due to perceived communist threats.

The initial reactions by Brazilian society and many Brazilian students, save a few extreme leftist members of the UNE, was apathy. The new military government had little tolerance for student dissent. The government quickly acted to limit students ability to be politically active by shutting down all student organization and beginning to arrest students and professors suspected of being communist.

In 1964, the government passed an act called Lei Suplicy, which officially dissolved the UNE and replaced it with a non-democratic student organization that was directly under government control. The UNE's physical building was also burned to the ground during the coup as an intimidation tactic. These repressive measures were a significant blow for student organizations, but clandestinely in 1996, the UNE reestablished with an overtly anti-government agenda.

In 1966, the clandestine UNE was able to organize an anti-government strike followed by a protest called the "National Day of Protest Against the Dictatorship". This protest was in response to increasingly repressive government measures. Earlier attempts at student mobilization had been met with police violence and student arrests. These protesters demanded the release of student prisoners, a repeal of Lei Suplicy, and the suspension of university professors suspected of being communist. At one protest of this national movement at a medical school in Rio de Janeiro, students were met with police violence.

== Notable demonstrations and conflict in 1968 ==
After the coup, the government met increasing student unrest with increasing violence. Students viewed the government as increasingly undemocratic and repressive, so they responded by escalating their resistance.

Students were also influenced to mobilize because the dictatorship's policies were directly influencing the quality and accessibility of Brazilian education. In particular, students were angry that there was not enough space in Brazilian schools to accommodate all students that had passed the entrance exam.

In 1968, student unrest reached its peak and mass protests struck the nation. The incident that incited the unrest was the murder of a poor student name Edson Luís de Lima Souto during a student protest in Rio. Students in a cafeteria were protesting the poor quality of state-run university cafeterias when police intervened violently, killing the young student.

His body was taken to the statehouse in protests and massive demonstrations followed. In particular, University students organized his funeral, which turned into an anti-dictatorship demonstration with over 50,000 attendees.

After this incident, student and police clashes became increasingly violent. Students would arm themselves with rocks, Molotov cocktails, and other makeshift weapons and barricade university buildings from police. Police killed more students when repressing increasingly violent protests. Students organized a march with labor parties and civilians that had over 100,000 participants. This demonstration was significant because it included many participants of different political alignments that joined together in protests of the military dictatorship.

== End of the student movement ==
During the latter half of 1968, government repression intensified. The government increasingly arrested and tortured students and professors for any suspected allegiance to leftist organizations.

In August, the military occupied The University of Brasilia. In October of that year, the police invaded the clandestine UNE conference. Over 700 UNE members and students were arrested, effectively removing most of the student movement's leaders.

The final blow to the student movement came when the government issued Institutional Act Number Five, which essentially eliminated all civil liberties guaranteed by the Brazilian government and legalized censorship, state surveillance, and cemented the military's uncontested authority.

This essentially prevented students from continuing to protesting the government through any means. Throughout the 70s, above ground student resistance movements were practically nonexistent.

== See also ==
- Diretas Ja
- Politics of Brazil
