= Edson Luís de Lima Souto =

Brazilian student protester killed by military police in 1968

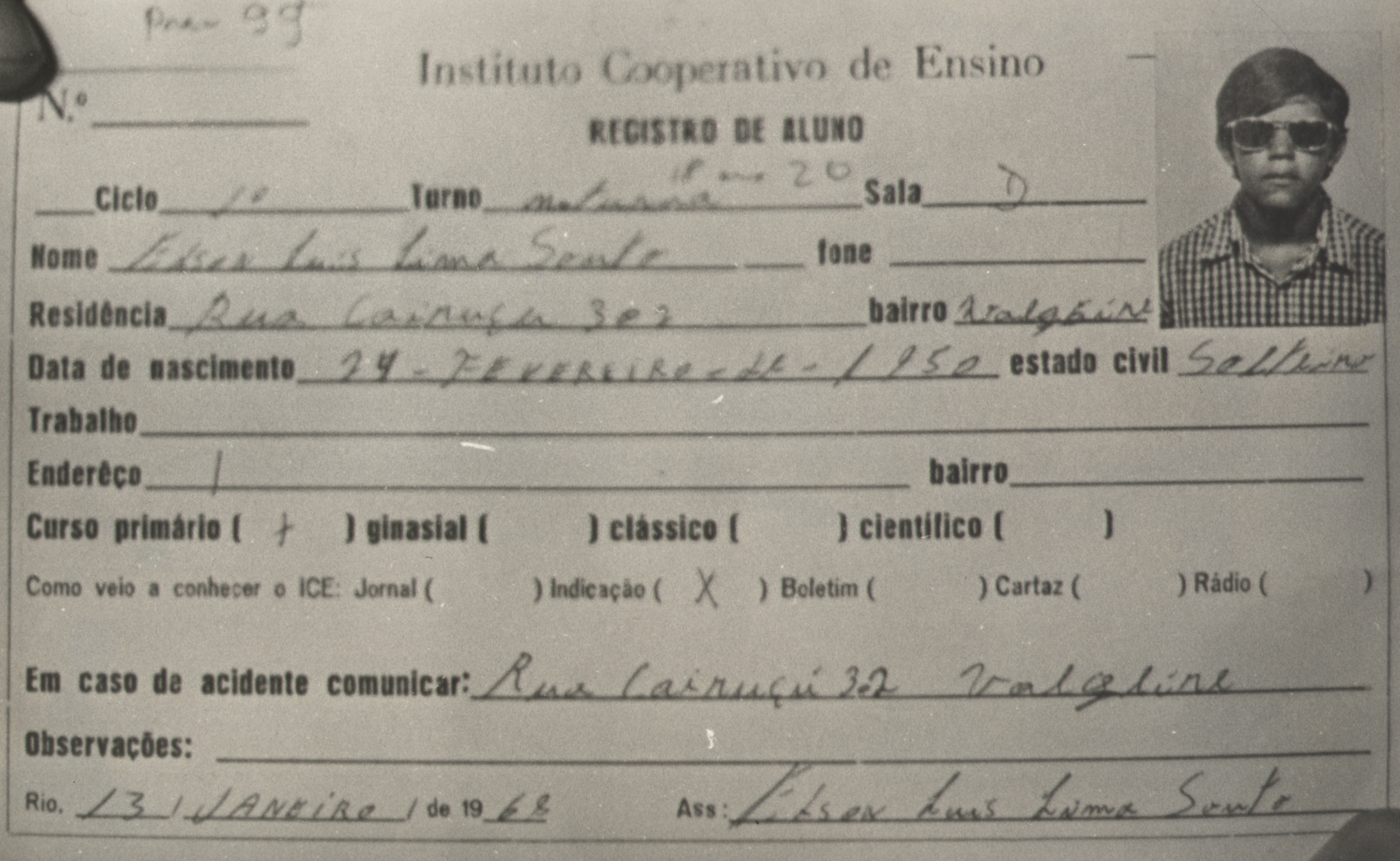
- Student registry of Edson Luiz. National Archives of Brazil
- Born: Edson Luís de Lima Souto; February 24, 1950; Belém, Pará, Brazil
- Died: March 28, 1968 (aged 18); Rio de Janeiro, Guanabara, Brazil
- Cause of death: Shot point blank in the chest by Aloísio Raposo, a Military Police officer
- Occupation: High school student

Edson Luís de Lima Souto (Portuguese pronunciation: [ˈɛdʒsõ luˈiz dʒi ˈlimɐ ˈsowtu]; February 24, 1950 – March 28, 1968) was a Brazilian teenage student killed by the military police of Rio de Janeiro after a confrontation in the restaurant Calabouço (IPA: [ˌkalɐˈbowsu]), in downtown Rio de Janeiro. Edson was one of the first students to be killed by the Brazilian military government, and the aftermath of his death marked the beginning of a turbulent year for the regime, which ended with the enactment of AI-5, a decree restricting most of the basic human rights guarantees.

== Biography ==
Born into an impoverished family of Belém, Pará, Edson Luís began his studies at the Augusto Meira State School in his hometown. He later moved to Rio de Janeiro in order to study at the Instituto Cooperativo de Ensino (English: Cooperative Education Institute), a high school facility where the Calabouço restaurant for low-income students operated.

== Death ==
On March 28, 1968, students in Rio de Janeiro organized a surprise march to protest against the high prices of meals in the Calabouço Restaurant, that began in the late afternoon on that same day.

Around 6:00 pm, the Military Police arrived at the location and dispersed the protesters who were in front of the building. Some students took refuge inside the restaurant and responded to police violence with sticks and stones. This caused the police to step back, and the street was left deserted. When the officers returned, shots were fired from the building of the Brazilian Legion of Assistance, which caused panic among the students, who fled the location.

The police believed that the students were planning to attack the nearby United States Embassy and eventually broke into the restaurant. During the raid, the commander of the Military Police troops, Aloísio Raposo, shot and killed Edson Luís with a point-blank shot into his chest. Another student, Benedito Frazão Dutra, was injured and later died in the hospital.

== Aftermath ==
Fearing that the police would hide Edson Luís' body, students did not allow him to be taken to the Forensic Institute; instead, they carried him to the Legislative Assembly of Rio de Janeiro, where a funeral service was held. An autopsy was performed there by doctors Nilo Ramos de Assis and Ivan Nogueira Bastos, under pressure from Military Police officers and agents of DOPS, the military regime's political police.

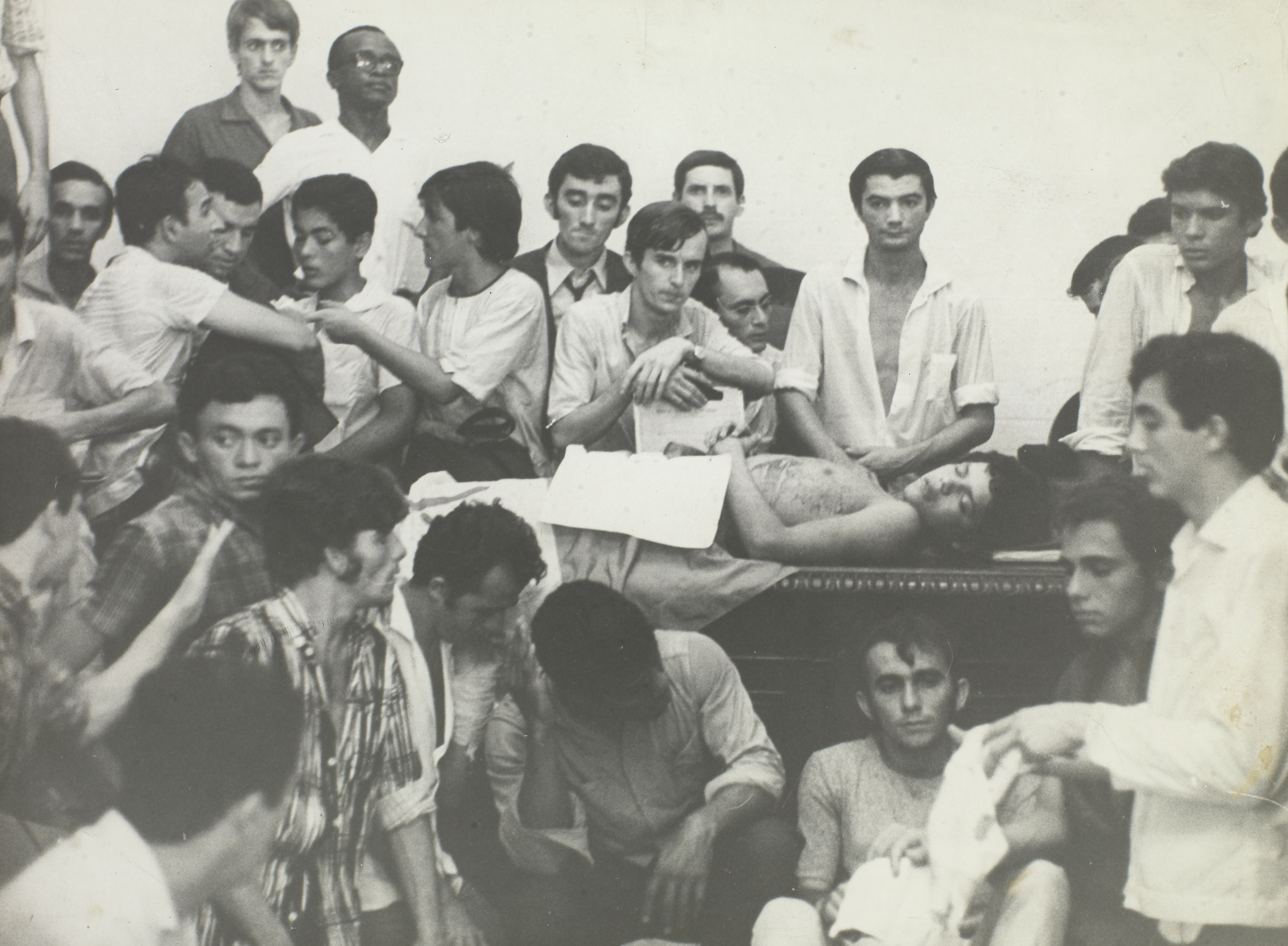
Body of Edson Luiz de Lima Souto, watched by students. National Archives of Brazil

Between the funeral and the seventh-day mass held in the Candelária Church on April 2, several demonstrations were organized across the country to protest against Edson Luís' death. In São Paulo, around 4,000 students staged a protest at the University of São Paulo Medical School. Demonstrations also were held in the August XI Academic Center of the São Francisco Law School, in the Polytechnic School of USP, and in the Pontifical Catholic University of São Paulo.

Rio de Janeiro stopped on the day of Edson Luís' burial. To express their protest, movie theaters in Cinelândia announced the screening of three films: The Night of the Generals, Point Blank, and Coração de Luto (Heart of Grief). In hundreds of movie posters phrases such as "Do bullets kill hunger?", "Old people in power, young people in coffin", and "They killed a student... what if it was your son?" were written.

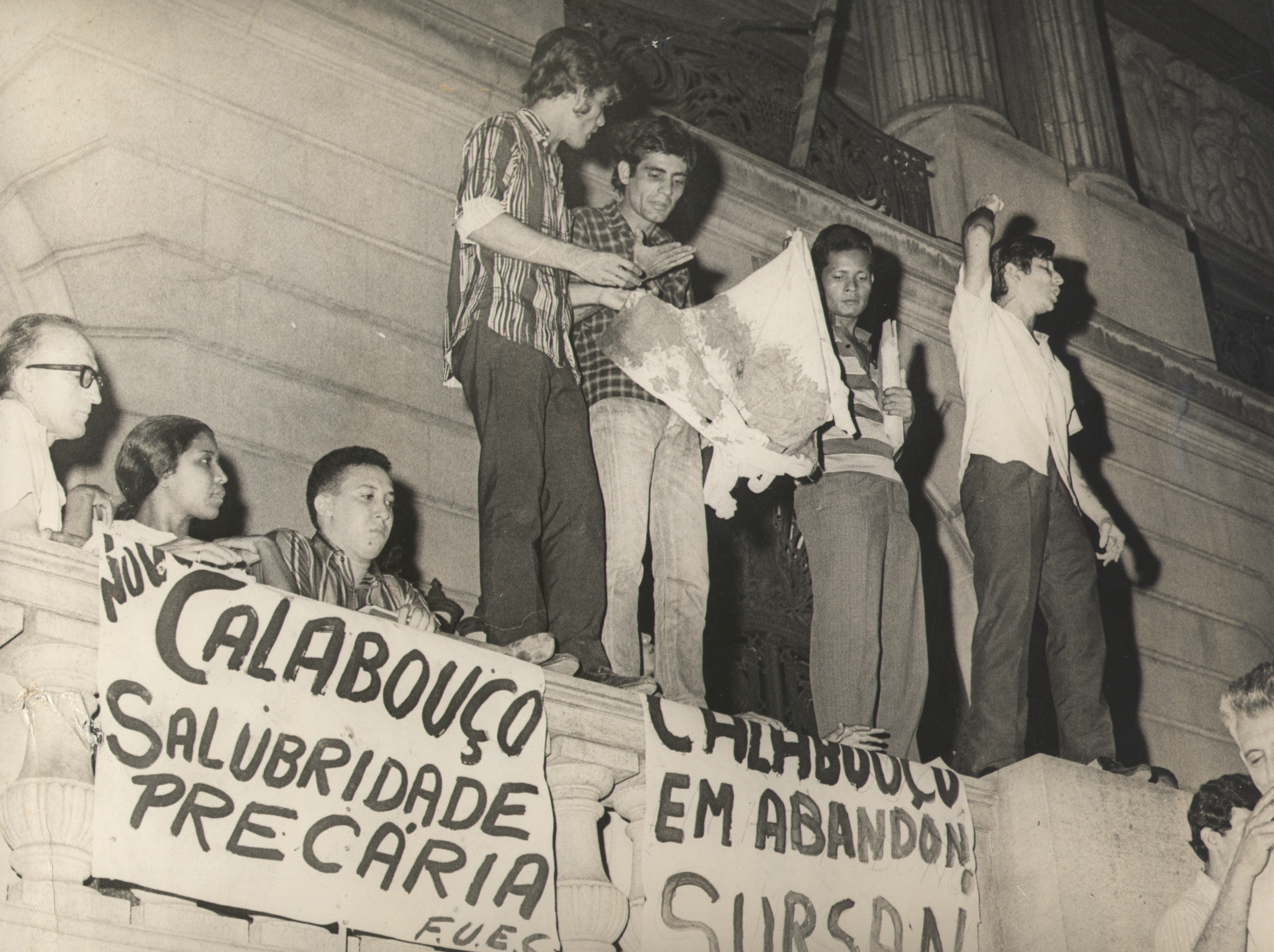
Mass rally in honor of Lima Souto. A protester shows the student's bloodstained shirt he wore when shot.

Edson Luís was buried to the sound of the "Brazilian National Anthem", sung by the crowd present at the cemetery.

== The mass ==
On the morning of April 4, a Roman Catholic mass was held at the Candelária Church to honor the memory of Edson Luís. After the mass, people leaving the church were attacked by the cavalry of the Military Police. Dozens of people were injured.

Another mass was to be held on the same day, but the military dictatorship vetoed the religious event. The vicar-general of Rio de Janeiro, D. Castro Pinto, however, insisted on performing it. Around 600 people attended the mass. Fearing a massacre, the priests ordered people not to leave the church. On the outside, there were three ranks of soldiers on horseback with sabers, behind them were the Marine Corps and several of the DOPS agents.

In an unprecedented act of courage, the churchmen took hands, forming a human barrier between the police and those who attended the mass. They escorted the churchgoers safely up to Rio Branco Street. However, the police waited until the clergymen left to start beating several people.

== Tributes ==
The song "Menino" (Boy), composed by Milton Nascimento and Ronaldo Bastos and recorded in the album Geraes (1976), is about Edson Luis.

The song "Coração de Estudante" (Student's Heart), composed by Wagner Tiso under the initial name "Tema de Jango" (Jango's Theme) for a documentary about João Goulart, received lyrics by Milton Nascimento remembering the tragedy of Edson Luís. The song was renamed "Coração de Estudante" and recorded in Nascimento's "Ao Vivo" (Live) album from 1983.

On March 28, 2008, to honor the 40 years since Edson Luís' death, a statue of him was inaugurated at the Ana Amélia Square (between Churchill Avenue and Santa Luzia Street), in Rio de Janeiro.

== See also ==
- 1960s Brazilian student movement
