= Presidency of Castelo Branco =

Brazilian governmental presidency (1964–1967)

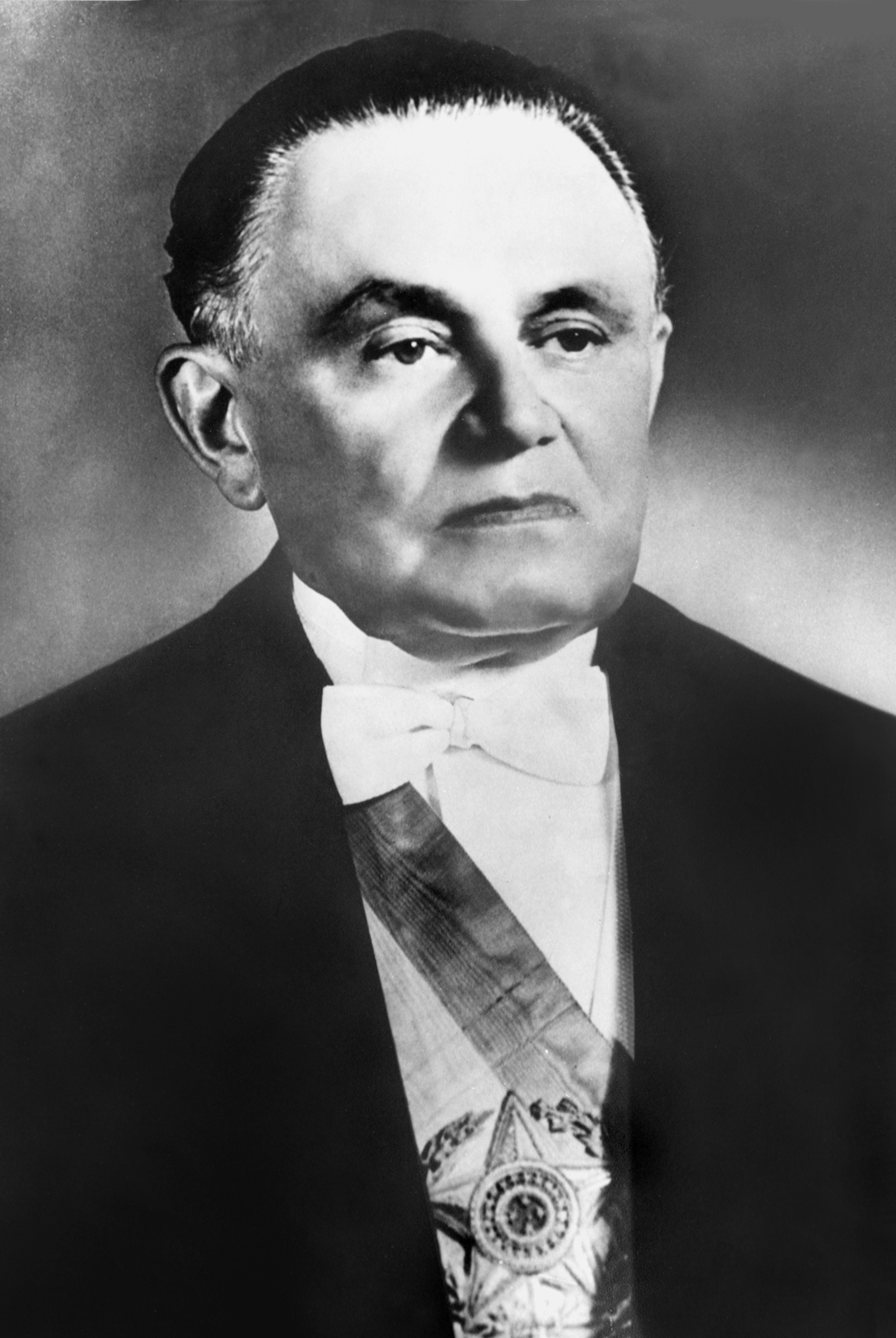
- Presidency of Castelo Branco; 15 April 1964 – 15 March 1967
- Vice President: José Maria Alkmin
- Party: ARENA
- Election: 1964
- Seat: Palácio da Alvorada
- Standard of the President

Castelo Branco's tenure as the 26th president of Brazil began on 15 April 1964, after he won the 1964 presidential election, and ended on 15 March 1967, when Artur da Costa e Silva took office.

Castelo Branco's government was the first of the Brazilian military dicatorship following the 1964 coup d'état. Its main objectives were to break up the reformist nationalist ideals represented by the Brazilian Labour Party (PTB) and deposed president João Goulart's base reforms project. One of the first measures of his administration was the promulgation of Institutional Act No. 2, which abolished the multi-party system in Brazil and granted the President of the Republic powers to revoke the terms of Congress members and call for indirect elections.

In Brazilian foreign policy, Castelo Branco resorted to the United States for economic, political and military support. During his term, Brazil's GDP grew by an average of 4.2% a year. Castelo Branco took over with inflation at 92.12% and handed over at 25.01%.

== Internal policy ==
=== Institutional Acts and changes ===
Castelo Branco's presidency began under Institutional Act No. 1, which revoked the political rights of former president Juscelino Kubitschek, then senator for Goiás, and other renowned congressmen and politicians. (Note: Jânio Quadros, João Goulart and Leonel Brizola were punished by the Supreme Command of the Revolution under the administration of Ranieri Mazzilli.) Similar sanctions also affected intellectuals, union leaders, students and civil servants. Three months after taking office, Castelo Branco's term was extended from 31 January 1966 to 15 March 1967, which led to the cancellation of the 1965 presidential elections. (Note: Date of the end of the government inaugurated by Jânio Quadros and then handed over to João Goulart.) On 26 November 1964, the federal government decreed intervention in Goiás and revoked the term of governor Mauro Borges. On 15 July 1965, it sanctioned a new Electoral Code with the aim of improving the Brazilian electoral system by curbing fraud from registration to the voting process.

Despite implementing Complementary Acts to consolidate its power, the federal government kept the elections for governor scheduled for 3 October 1965: in Alagoas, the result was not ratified because it did not satisfy the absolute majority rule under Constitutional Amendment Thirteen, promulgated on 8 April. (Note: The Legislative Assembly of Alagoas, summoned to solve the impasse, rejected the nomination of Muniz Falcão, who had won the most votes at the polls. General João Tubino became interim governor of Alagoas from 31 January to 16 August 11966, when Lamenha Filho, elected under the combined rules of Institutional Act No. 3 and Complementary Act No. 12 of 28 June 1966, was sworn in.) In Goiás, Maranhão, Mato Grosso, Pará, Paraíba, Paraná, Rio Grande do Norte and Santa Catarina, the candidates supported by Brasília won, but the victory of the opposition in Guanabara and Minas Gerais provided support for the establishment of bipartisanship through Institutional Act No. 2, which created ARENA, the majority party supporting the government, and the MDB, the opposition party.

As a result, the government made elections for state governors indirect and removed the autonomy of the capitals through Institutional Act No. 3, published in 1966. In order to guarantee support for its proposals, the Castelo Branco administration changed the balance of power in the states: it weakened Vitorino Freire's rule by supporting José Sarney as governor of Maranhão and removed Ademar de Barros from the São Paulo government. On 3 September, twelve governors were indirectly elected and on 15 November, 23 senators and 409 federal deputies were directly elected. (Note: In 1966, there were indirect elections for governor in Acre, Alagoas, Amazonas, Bahia, Ceará, Espírito Santo, Pernambuco, Piauí, Rio de Janeiro, Rio Grande do Sul, São Paulo and Sergipe.) Castelo Branco decreed a 33-day recess for the National Congress from 20 October, in response to congressman Adauto Lúcio Cardoso, president of the Chamber of Deputies, who had kept in office six oppositionists removed from their posts a few days earlier. (Note: Federal deputies Abraão Moura, Adib Chammas, César Prieto, Doutel de Andrade, Paes de Almeida and the acting deputy, Humberto El-Jaick, were removed from office.)

Castelo Branco also extinguished the União Nacional dos Estudantes (English: National Union of Students, UNE) and other organizations and resorted to forceful measures, such as invading the University of Brasília. On 7 December 1966, he instituted Institutional Act No. 4, which decreed the drafting of a new constitution for Brazil. On 24 January 1967, the document was promulgated, but it only became effective when Costa e Silva took office on 15 March. On 9 February, a new Press Law was sanctioned.

=== Economy ===
==== Economic crisis in the 1960s ====
From 1962 onwards, Brazil experienced low growth rates, reaching just 0.6% increase in 1963. There was a fall in public and private investment and a rise in the public deficit, which caused inflation to accelerate, from 47.8% in 1961 to 51.6% in 1962 and 79.9% in 1963. Between 1964 and 1968, inflation was reduced from 92.1% to 25.5% a year.

==== Programa de Ação Econômica do Governo (1964-1967) ====
The Programa de Ação Econômica do Governo (Government's Economic Action Programme, PAEG), designed by Roberto Campos, the Minister of Planning, and Octávio Gouveia Bulhões, the Minister of Finance, focused on promoting tax, financial and labour reforms and reducing regional imbalances. It imposed strict credit restrictions and instituted a new wage formula, causing severe deterioration in the purchasing value. The PAEG's objectives were:

- Accelerating economic growth;
- Containing inflation;
- Reduce income concentration (regional, sectoral and personal);
- Increase employment;
- Correct the external imbalance.

In order to structure the Sistema Financeiro Nacional (National Financial System) and correct inflation, Castelo Branco established unpopular measures that would lead to relative economic success:

- Changes to the tax structure (indirect taxes were raised and direct taxes reduced to protect strategic sectors due to the concentration of income);
- Restrictive monetary policy (mainly low currency issuance);
- Stabilizing prices and reducing purchasing power.

=== Terrorism ===
During the first half of 1965, the Três Passos Guerrilla was defeated and an explosion damaged the office of O Estado de S. Paulo. On 25 July 1966, a bomb exploded in the lobby of Recife International Airport. Aimed at Costa e Silva, a former army minister and presidential candidate, the attack killed journalist Edson Régis de Carvalho and retired vice-admiral Nelson Gomes Fernandes, and left fourteen wounded, including civil guard Sebastião Thomaz de Aquino. On the same day, explosions with no victims hit the headquarters of the UEE and the United States Information Agency (USIS).

=== Base Industrial de Defesa (BID) ===
The Base Industrial de Defesa (Defence Industrial Base, BID) is a set of state-owned or private companies that participate in one or more stages of research, development, production, distribution and maintenance of defence products (goods and services) and can contribute to the achievement of objectives related to Brazil's security or defence.

The Castelo Branco government was responsible for developing initiatives aimed at establishing a defence industrial complex. The incentives, combined with industrial potential, qualified human capital and a favourable international market, led the BID to evolve rapidly, resulting in Brazil becoming the world's fifth largest exporter in the defence sector by 1970.

=== Presidential succession ===
In a session that lasted three hours, marshal Costa e Silva was elected president of Brazil under the ARENA ticket on 3 October 1966, after winning 295 votes in the National Congress, one of which was cast by opposition deputy Anísio Rocha, from Goiás.

== Foreign policy ==
Brazil broke off diplomatic relations with Cuba on 2 May 1964. The following year, a civil war in the Dominican Republic put an end to the coup d'état that had ousted president Juan Bosch in 1963. However, an invasion by the United States, endorsed a posteriori by the Organization of American States, extended the conflict for a year in order to prevent a new Cuban Revolution. In the meantime, 280 Brazilian soldiers occupied the National Palace in Santo Domingo on 1 June 1965. Brasília and Havana only resumed diplomatic relations in 1986.

== See also ==
- Institutional Act Number Five
