= Auro de Moura Andrade =

Brazilian lawyer and politician

Senator for São Paulo
- In office 29 October 1969 – 1 February 1971
- Preceded by: Seat vacant
- Succeeded by: Franco Montoro
- In office 1 February 1955 – 9 June 1968
- Preceded by: Euclides Vieira
- Succeeded by: Seat vacant

Ambassador of Brazil to Spain
- In office 15 October 1968 – 29 October 1969
- Nominated by: Artur da Costa e Silva
- Preceded by: Antônio Cândido da Câmara Canto
- Succeeded by: Manoel Emílio Pereira Guilhon

President of the Federal Senate
- In office 11 March 1962 – 22 February 1968
- Preceded by: João Goulart
- Succeeded by: Gilberto Marinho

Vice President of the Federal Senate
- In office 11 March 1961 – 11 March 1962
- Preceded by: Filinto Müller
- Succeeded by: Ruy Palmeira

Member of the Chamber of Deputies
- In office 11 March 1951 – 1 February 1955
- Constituency: São Paulo

State Deputy of Sâo Paulo
- In office 14 March 1947 – 11 March 1951
- Constituency: At-large

Personal details
- Born: Auro Soares de Moura Andrade; 19 September 1915 Barretos, São Paulo, Brazil
- Died: 29 May 1982 (aged 66) São Paulo, São Paulo, Brazil
- Party: ARENA (1965–1980); PSD (1956–1965); PTN (1954–1956); UDN (1947–1954)
- Parent: Antônio Joaquim de Moura Andrade (father)
- Education: University of São Paulo
- Occupation: Lawyer • politician

Auro Soares de Moura Andrade (19 September 1915 – 29 May 1982), commonly known as Auro de Moura Andrade or Moura Andrade, was a Brazilian lawyer and politician. He was born into a wealthy family of farmers from the countryside, son of the cattle rancher Antônio Joaquim de Moura Andrade, known as "The King of Cattle".

== Revolution of 1932 ==
At the age of 17, was part of the Constitutionalist Revolution of 1932, graduating later in law in the Law School of the Largo São Francisco (USP), where he developed intense political activity, signaling his future in the Brazilian public life.

As the head of the periodicals "A Urna" (The Ballot Box) and "O Democrata" ("The Democrat"), fought against the government of Getúlio Vargas, which ended closing them.

Great speaker, characteristic that would follow him in his parliamentary life, Andrade was lawyer and held many positions in the State, being also director of the Commercial Association.

== Political career ==
In 1947, Auro was elected state deputy by the National Democratic Union (UDN) and, in 1950, federal deputy. In 1954, was elected senator by the National Labor Party (PTN). Brilliant parliamentarian, joined the Social Democratic Party (PSD), which he would become highlighted. In 1961, was elected president of the Senate, which position he would hold for 7 years, always being re-elected.

In 1958, was defeated after running for governor of São Paulo, occasion which Carvalho Pinto was elected with the support of Jânio Quadros.

In 1962, was re-elected senator for São Paulo with more than 1 million votes.

== Jânio Quadros resignation ==
Moura Andrade was president of the National Congress when president Jânio Quadros resigned in August 1961. Moura Andrade received Quadros's resignation letter and immediately called in the Congress. In 4 minutes and a half, he read the letter, stated that Quadros was not in Brasília anymore and invited all the parliamentarians for the swearing-in of his constitutional successor, which would occur in 10 minutes. 20 minutes after the summoning, Moura Andrade declared vacancy of the presidential position, as Vice President João Goulart was in an official trip to China. A deputy threw him a microphone and another tried to take the letter from him, but in less than half an hour sworn Ranieri Mazzilli, president of the Chamber of Deputies.

Moura Andrade had an important role in the changing to the parliamentary system, which made possible the inauguration of Vice President João Goulart as President of the Republic. Along with Mazzilli and Ernesto Geisel, he received Goulart in the airport when Goulart returned to Brasília on 5 September.

Never were clear the reasons that made Auro declare vacancy of the Presidency in 1 April 1964. In the occasion, João Goulart was in Rio Grande do Sul, as the press reported in those days and, besides that, there was the reading of a letter forwarded to the National Congress by then Chief of Staff of the Presidency of Republic Darcy Ribeiro, communicating that Goulart trip was official.

Was invited to be Prime Minister, as long as he left written a resign-letter in the hands of the President. Refused to accept the imposition, saying to Goulart that such suggestion would make him - Moura Andrade - "not Prime Minister, but Last".

== 1964 coup d'etat ==
In March 1964, Moura Andrade participated, in São Paulo, in the March of the Family with God for Liberty, public act against the government. In the 30th of the same month, launched a manifest to the nation declaring disruption between the Legislative and the Executive powers, called in the militaries to position themselves in the defense of the institutions.

On the next day, the coup happened and, even with President Goulart in the office and in Brazilian soil, Moura Andrade, in a tumultuous session of the Congress over which he presided, declared the Presidency vacant, going personally, by foot, ahead of a legion of congressmen, to the Planalto Palace to inaugurate the deputy Ranieri Mazzilli as President of the Republic. Before ending the session, Moura Andrade stated:

There is under our responsibility the population of Brazil, the people, the order. Therefore, I declare vacant the Presidency of the Republic (extended applause, protests) and, according to the terms of article 79 of the Constitution, I declare President of the Republic the President of the Chamber of Deputies, Ranieri Mazzilli.

He was appointed by many parliamentarians to compose, as Vice President, the ticket that would elect marshal Castelo Branco for President, but however, resigned the candidacy in the Second Round of the indirect election, on 11 April 1964, and José Maria Alkmin replaced him, who practically had no opposition.

Disenchanted with the coup that he supported, Moura Andrade, with the boldness that characterized him, publicly stated that "Japona wasn't gown", (Note: The term japona was used to mention the military uniform and toga (gown in English) to refer to court dresses.) after being falsely accused by a superior official in charge of an inquiry. Because of that, even having great prestige, he was defeated in the partisan convention that chose the ARENA party candidates for the Senate to represent São Paulo in 1970, which made his re-election impossible.

Moura Andrade was the ambassador of Brazil in Spain for a year and a half between 1968 and 1969, after which he returned to Brazil, leaving politics. He was president of the Development Bank of São Paulo State until his death in 1982.

In retrospective (notably with the end of the Military Regime), the role of Moura Andrade in 1964 started to be severely questioned. Many criticize him for, in his attributions as president of the National Congress, giving institutional support for the illegitimate power takeover by the Armed Forces (contradicting the Constitution of 1946), instead of maintaining the republican order and assuring the continuity of a government elected democratically.

== Books ==
- Um Congresso contra o arbítrio: Diários e memória. Rio de Janeiro: Nova Fronteira, 1985.

== See also ==
- Pascoal Ranieri Mazzilli
- 1964 Brazilian coup d'etat

== Explanatory notes ==
Political offices
Preceded by João Goulart	President of the Federal Senate; 1961–68	Succeeded by Gilberto Marinho
