= 1964 Brazilian presidential election =

- 11 April 1964
- Presidential election
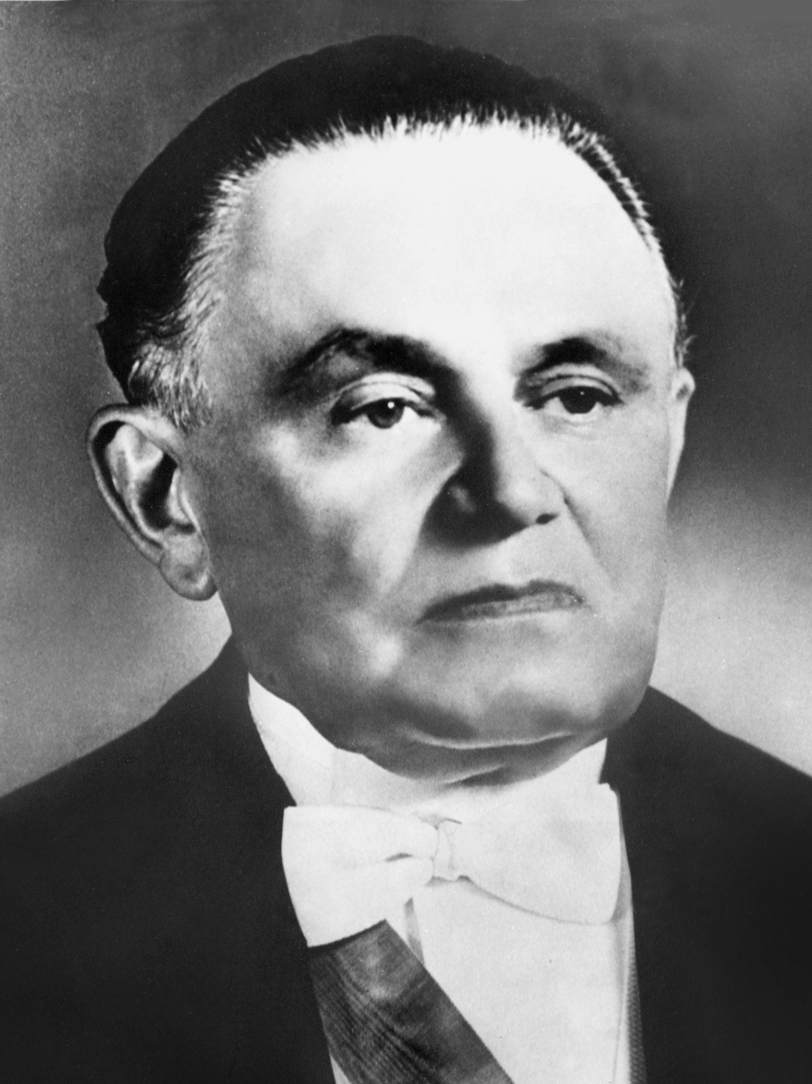

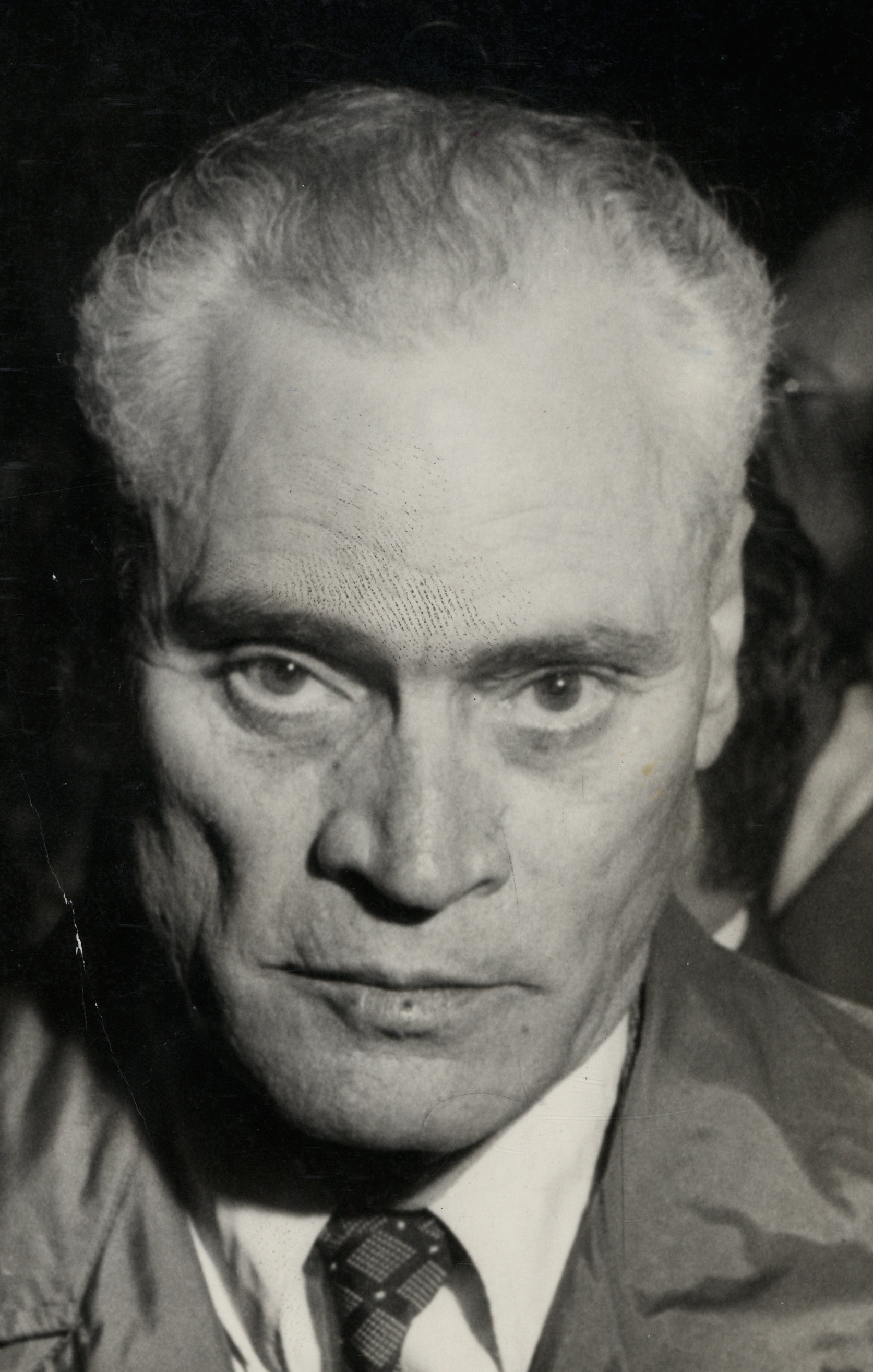
Nominee	Castelo Branco	Juarez Távora
Party	Independent	PDC
Electoral vote	361	3
Percentage	98.63%	0.82%
President before election
Ranieri Mazzilli
PSD
Elected President
Humberto Castelo Branco
Independent

Indirect presidential elections were held in Brazil on 11 April 1964 shortly after the 1964 coup carried out by the Brazilian military. Humberto de Alencar Castelo Branco was elected president by the National Congress, receiving 361 of the 366 votes cast. José Maria Alkmin was elected vice-president unopposed after Auro de Moura Andrade withdrew his candidacy.

== Background ==
Following the events of the coup in the same year, João Goulart, the president, was deposed by allegations of leaving the country with no permission. Since João Goulart was already the vice president, the president of the Chamber of Deputies, Ranieri Mazzili, assumed the post until a new president to be elected until 1965 (the end of João Goulart term) by the National Congress of Brazil. The date of election, was scheduled by the first Institutional Act, amended by the Supreme Command of the Revolution, the de facto ruler over Brazil at that moment.

The Social Democratic Party, now as an opposition party in parliament, like the National Democratic Union, agreed to elect Castelo Branco as president. Castelo Branco promised to preserve the Brazilian Democracy and fight against corruption and the crisis in the country. A new civil vice-president was elected on the same day.

== Results ==
=== President ===
The election was virtually a single-runner election; some parliamentarians voted for Juarez Távora as a protest vote.

Candidate	Party	Votes	%
Castelo Branco	Independent	361	98.63
Juarez Távora	Christian Democratic Party	3	0.82
Eurico Gaspar Dutra	Social Democratic Party	2	0.55
Total		366	100.00

=== Vice President ===
None of the candidates for vice-president achieved the required absolute majority of votes in the first round. José Maria Alkmin received 203 votes; Auro de Moura Andrade received 150 votes; Ranieri Mazzilli received 2 votes; Milton Campos received 2 votes; Antonio Sanchez Galdeano received 1 vote; and there were 63 abstentions. For the second round of voting, Moura Andrade withdrew his candidacy, and Alkmin was elected with 256 of the 268 votes cast.

Candidate	Party	First round		Second round	
Candidate	Party	Votes	%	Votes	%
José Maria Alkmin	Social Democratic Party	203	56.70	256	95.52
Auro de Moura Andrade	Social Democratic Party	150	41.90	9	3.36
Milton Campos	National Democratic Union	2	0.56	2	0.75
Pascoal Ranieri Mazzilli	Social Democratic Party	2	0.56		
Antônio Sanchez Galdeano	Independent	1	0.28		
Juarez Távora	Christian Democratic Party			1	0.37
Total		358	100.00	268	100.00
