= João Goulart (disambiguation) =

João Goulart (1919-1976) was a Brazilian politician who served as the 24th President of Brazil.

João Goulart may also refer to:

- João Goulart Filho (born 1956), Brazilian politician and philosopher, and son of former president
- João Goulart (footballer) (born 2000), Portuguese footballer
- João Goulart's House, house of the Brazilian former president
- Presidente João Goulart, bairro in the District of Sede
