= Jango (1984 film) =

1984 film directed by Silvio Tendler

- Theatrical release poster
- Directed by: Sílvio Tendler
- Written by: Sílvio Tendler; Maurício Dias
- Produced by: Hélio Ferraz
- Starring: Archive footage: João Goulart; Juscelino Kubitschek; Interviews: Leonel Brizola; Frei Betto; Magalhães Pinto; Afonso Arinos; Celso Furtado
- Narrated by: José Wilker
- Cinematography: Lúcio Kodato; Américo Vermelho
- Edited by: Francisco Sérgio Moreira
- Music by: Milton Nascimento; Wagner Tiso
- Production companies: Caliban Produções Cinematográficas; Rob Filmes
- Distributed by: Caliban Produções Cinematográficas; Embrafilme
- Release date: March 27, 1984
- Running time: 117 minutes
- Country: Brazil
- Language: Portuguese

Jango is a 1984 Brazilian documentary film directed by Sílvio Tendler.

== Content summary ==
The film traces the life of João Goulart, 24th President of Brazil, who was deposed by a military-led coup on March 31, 1964 after he proposed a broad program of reforms in areas such as land, education and elections. Goulart was popularly known as "Jango", therefore the title of the film, released exactly 20 years after the coup. Goulart's life is reproduced through archive footage and interviews with important political icons such as Afonso Arinos, Leonel Brizola, Celso Furtado, Frei Betto and Magalhães Pinto, among others. The film was promoted under the suggestive tagline "Como, quando e por que se derruba um presidente" ("How, when and why a President is overthrown").

The documentary captures the effervescence of Brazilian politics of the early 1960s under the context of Cold War. Jango narrates exhaustively the details of the coup and extends itself to the first resistance movements against the dictatorship, ending with the death of the President in exile on Argentina and images of his funeral, which were originally forbidden by the military regime.

The film is narrated by José Wilker and the original score was composed by Milton Nascimento and Wagner Tiso, while historian Denise Goulart, Jango's only daughter, was one of its associate producers.

== Box office ==
According to the Ministry of Culture of Brazil, Jango took over half a million people to the movie theaters, becoming the sixth highest grossing documentary of Brazilian cinema. Other two films directed by Tendler, O Mundo Mágico dos Trapalhões and Anos JK (about Juscelino Kubitschek, of whom Goulart was Vice-President), are respectively the first and fourth films on the list.

== Awards ==
Jango received the Golden Daisy Award for Best Documentary Feature from the National Conference of Brazilian Bishops. It also received three awards at the Gramado Film Festival and the Special Jury Prize at the Havana Film Festival.

== See also ==
- List of films depicting Latin American military dictatorships
