= Silvio Tendler =

Brazilian filmmaker (1950–2025)

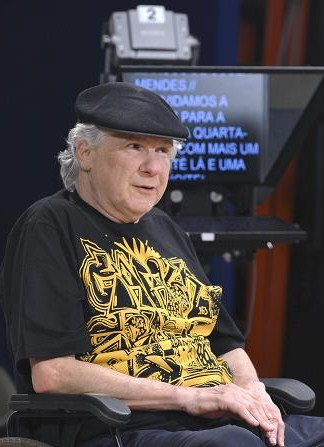
- Tendler in 2013
- Born: 1950; Rio de Janeiro, Brazil
- Died: September 5, 2025 (aged 75); Rio de Janeiro, Brazil
- Occupations: Director; producer; screenwriter
- Years active: 1975–2025

Silvio Tendler (1950 – September 5, 2025) was a Brazilian filmmaker. With more than 40 films released by 2014, including feature and short films, Tendler was one of the most respected Brazilian documentarians. Due to his focus on people like Juscelino Kubitschek, João Goulart, and Carlos Marighella, he was known as "the filmmaker of the defeated" or "the filmmaker of interrupted dreams".

== Life and career ==
Born in Rio de Janeiro in 1950, Tendler graduated in History at the Paris Diderot University (1975), majored in Cinema and History at the École pratique des hautes études in Sorbonne (1976), and specialized in Documentary Cinema Applied to Social Sciences at the Musée Guimet in Sorbonne (1973). During his stay in France, he worked on the collaborative documentary La spirale in 1975 with several directors, among them Chris Marker. The acquaintanceship with Marker and other filmmakers, including Jean Rouch, Wladimir Carvalho, Santiago Álvarez and Joris Ivens was remarked by Tendler.

He returned from France to Brazil, and decided to make a film about Juscelino Kubitschek. It resulted in Os Anos JK – Uma Trajetória Política (1980), a box office success with 800,000 viewers. In 1981, he directed a film about Os Trapalhões, O Mundo Mágico dos Trapalhões, which became the most watched Brazilian documentary of all time with over 1.8 million viewers. In that same year, he created Caliban Produções Cinematográficas, a production company focused on historical biographies.

Tendler died in Rio de Janeiro on September 5, 2025, at the age of 75.

== Filmography ==
=== Feature films ===
- Os Anos JK – Uma Trajetória Política (1980)
- O Mundo Mágico dos Trapalhões (1981)
- Jango (1984)
- Castro Alves - Retrato Falado do Poeta (1998)
- Glauber o Filme, Labirinto do Brasil (2003)
- Encontro com Milton Santos: O Mundo Global Visto do Lado de Cá (2006)
- Utopia e Barbárie (2008)
- Tancredo, a Travessia (2010)
- O veneno está na mesa (2011)
- O veneno está na mesa 2 (2014)
