= João Goulart's House =

1927 house in Rio Grande do Sul, Brazil

- Casa de João Goulart
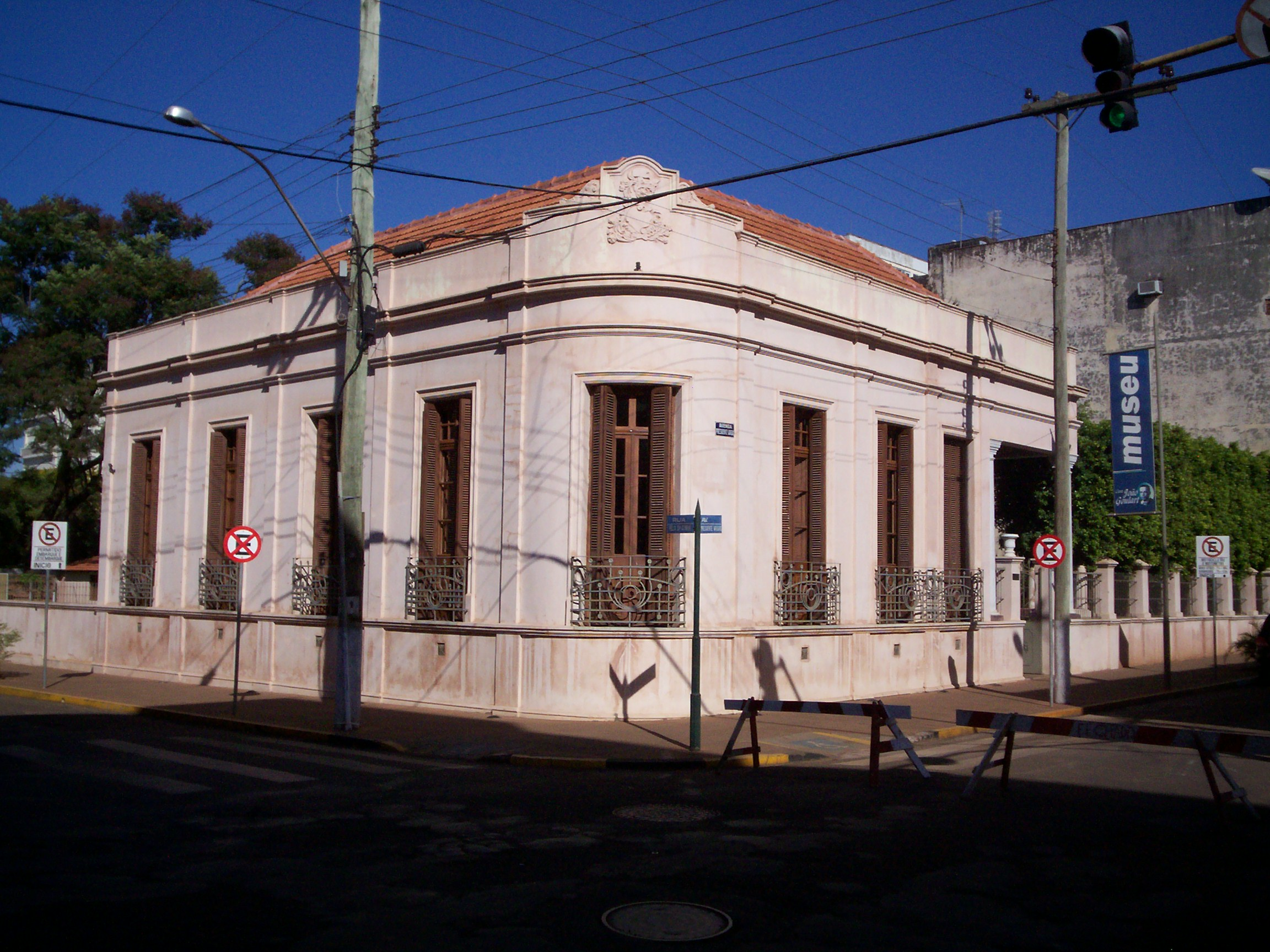
- Interactive map of the João Goulart's House area

General information
- Architectural style: Eclectic
- Location: São Borja, Brazil
- Coordinates: 28°39′35″S 56°00′14″W
- Named for: João Goulart
- Construction started: 1927
- Owner: City Hall of São Borja
- First owner: Col. Vicente Rodrigues Goulart

João Goulart's House is a big house built in 1927, where former Brazilian President João Goulart lived during his childhood and youth. It is located in the city of São Borja, in the state of Rio Grande do Sul. João Goulart's house is a historical heritage, protected by the State Institute of Historical and Artistic Heritage (IPHAE), on February 7, 1994, under process number 03/94.

The house was abandoned for a while and between the years 2008 and 2009 underwent restorations to house the João Goulart House Memorial cultural space, its current function.

== Architecture ==
Of eclectic architecture, the house has a basement and a floor. The external walls were built in masonry and the roof with clay tiles. Before the renovation and adaptations to house the memorial, the house had a living room, an office, a girls' bedroom connected to the parents' bedroom, a living room with a fireplace, and a glass veranda. In the annex, in the back of the house, was the boys' bedroom and the servants' quarters.

== João Goulart's House Memorial ==
Inaugurated on October 2, 2009, the João Goulart Memorial House holds the former president's collection, with documents, texts, images and objects related to João Goulart's life. The house also has period furniture, exhibition rooms, and a video room. In addition to the Memorial, the house also houses a handicraft workshop, the João Goulart Institute's office, the São Borja Municipal Culture Office, and a coffee shop.
