= Humberto de Alencar Castelo Branco =

President of Brazil from 1964 to 1967

His Excellency Castelo Branco
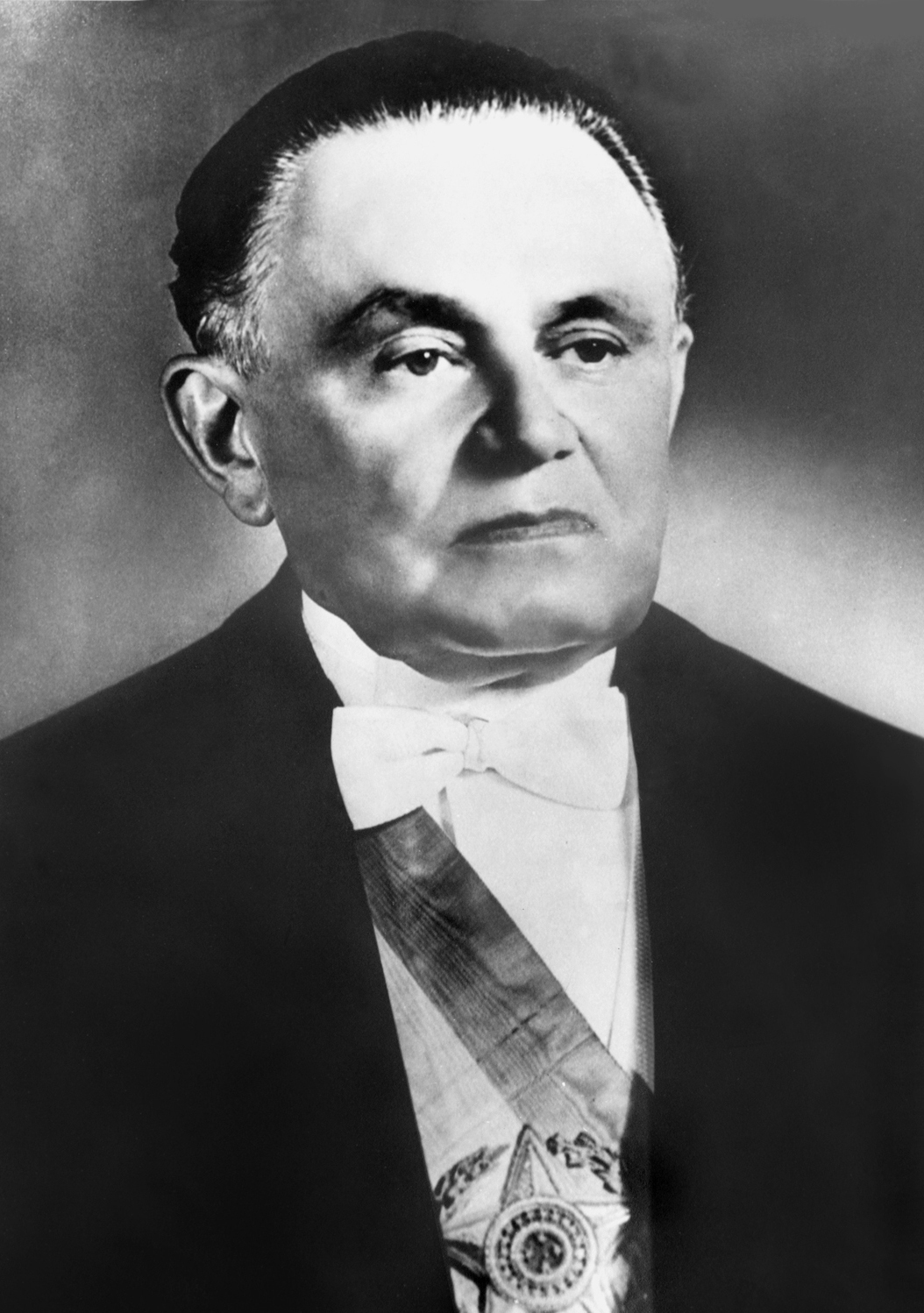
- Official portrait, 1964

26th President of Brazil
- In office 15 April 1964 – 15 March 1967
- Vice President: José Maria Alkmin
- Preceded by: Ranieri Mazzilli
- Succeeded by: Artur da Costa e Silva

Chief of the Army General Staff
- In office 13 September 1963 – 14 April 1964
- President: João Goulart; Ranieri Mazzilli
- Preceded by: José Machado Lopes
- Succeeded by: Décio Palmeiro Escobar

Personal details
- Born: 20 September 1897 Fortaleza, Ceará, Brazil
- Died: 18 July 1967 (aged 69) Fortaleza, Ceará, Brazil
- Cause of death: Plane crash
- Resting place: Castelo Branco Mausoleum
- Party: ARENA (1966–1967)
- Spouse: Argentina Viana (m. 1922; died 1963)
- Children: 3
- Parent(s): Cândido Borges Castelo Branco (father); Antonieta de Alencar Gurgel (mother)
- Education: Military School of Realengo; Officers Improvement School; Army General Staff School

Military service
- Allegiance: Brazil
- Branch/service: Brazilian Army
- Years of service: 1918–1964
- Rank: Field marshal
- Commands: See list: 3rd General Staff Operations Section of the 1st Expeditionary Infantry Division; Brazilian Expeditionary Force General Staff; 11th Infantry Regiment; 3rd Army General Staff Section; 10th Military Region; School of General Staff; Garrison of the Amazon; 8th Military Region
- Battles/wars: Prestes Column; Revolution of 1930; World War II; Italian campaign; 1964 Brazilian coup d'état
- Castelo Branco's voice Speech by Castelo Branco announcing Institutional Act No. 2 (recorded 1965)

Humberto de Alencar Castelo Branco (Note: Portuguese pronunciation: [ũˈbɛʁtu dʒi alẽˈkaʁ kasˈtɛlu ˈbɾɐ̃ku].) (20 September 1897 – 18 July 1967) was a Brazilian military officer and politician who served as the 26th president of Brazil, the first leader of the Brazilian military dictatorship following the 1964 coup d'état. He was a member of a more liberal "legalist" faction within the regime, as opposed to his more authoritarian successors.

His administration oversaw the consolidation of the military regime. One of his first acts was the enactment of Institutional Act No. 2, which abolished the multi-party system in the country and granted the president of the republic the power to revoke the mandates of congressmen and call for indirect elections. In Brazilian foreign policy, he began to seek economic, political, and military support from the United States. He was the son of General Cândido Borges Castelo Branco, the sixth grandson of the eleventh Lord of Pombeiro and his wife, the ninth Lady of Belas, and his wife Antonieta de Alencar Gurgel, a member of the family of the writer José de Alencar.

== Family background ==
Castelo Branco was born in a wealthy Northeastern Brazilian family having roots in Coura (Paredes de Coura), Portugal. His father, Cândido Borges Castelo Branco, was a general. His mother, Antonieta Alencar Castelo Branco, came from a family of intellectuals (which included the writer José de Alencar).

He was married to Argentina Vianna, and had three children, Nieta Paulo and Francisco

== Military career ==
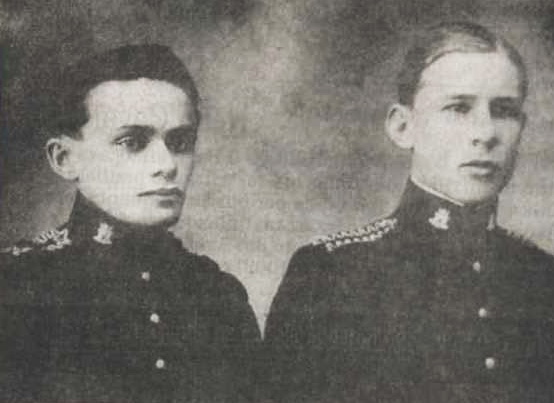
Castelo Branco (left) and Amaury Kruel at the Military School of Porto Alegre, c. 1912–1917

Castelo Branco joined the Brazilian Army at Rio Pardo Military School in Rio Grande do Sul. In 1918, he joined the Military School of Realengo in Rio de Janeiro, as an infantry cadet, and was declared second lieutenant in 1921, being assigned to the 12th Infantry Regiment in Belo Horizonte. In 1923, he reached the rank of first lieutenant. In 1924, still as lieutenant, he completed the Infantry Advanced Course and, upon returning to the 12th RI, was assigned the task of commanding a detachment from the unit and integrating the legal forces that would come to grips with and overcome internal revolts hatched in São Paulo in 1925. He then returned to the Military School of Realengo as an infantry instructor in 1927. He participated, like many other lieutenants of his time, in the Revolution of 1930.

In 1931, he attended the Command and General Staff College (ECEME), in which he was the first placed of his class. Promoted to major in 1938, he was enrolled in the French War College and upon returning to Brazil, he served as an instructor at the Military School of Realengo.

He was promoted to lieutenant colonel in 1943 and attended the Command and General Staff College in the United States. Then he was head of the 3rd. Section (Operations) of the Brazilian Expeditionary Force (FEB) during World War II, in Italy, remaining for three hundred days on the battlefields. He sent sixty letters to his wife, Argentina Viana Castelo Branco, and his two sons. At FEB, he planned and implemented military maneuvers in combat in Italy, especially at the Battle of Monte Castello. According to Marshal Cordeiro de Farias, Castello won exceptional prestige at FEB, for being a great strategist and having a privileged head.

Promoted to colonel in 1945, Castelo Branco returned to Brazil with the firm intention of transmitting his professional experiences to the officers of the Army. In this way, it assumed the position of director of studies of the ECEME, and transformed this school into a true center of doctrinal investigations. Castelo Branco systematized, mainly between 1946 and 1947, the reasoning method for the study of decision factors, recommended by the French Military Mission, with a structure of work within the command, better disciplining the activities of the commander and his staff officers.

In 1955, he helped with the Army's administrative reshaping and supported the military movement headed by the minister of war, General Henrique Teixeira Lott, who secured the inauguration of President-elect Juscelino Kubitschek, who at that time was threatened with a military coup.

Months later, when trade union organizations resolved to hand over to the Minister a golden sword, Castelo severely broke with General Lott. The press recorded a few moments of this misunderstanding.

As general, he commanded ECEME, between 15 September 1954 and 3 January 1956. During this period, he perfected his Command Work of 1948, seeking to better suit him characteristics of Brazilian chiefs and staff officers. Conferences such as "The War Doctrine and the Modern War" and "Security Problems", held in ECEME, are milestones in the evolution of the doctrinal thinking of this school.

He also commanded the 8th Military Region in Belém, the 10th Military Region in Fortaleza, and the IV Army in Recife. At the time he reached the Presidency of the republic, he was chief of staff of the army, a position he held from 13 September 1963, to 14 April 1964.

== Political career ==
Inauguration of Castelo Branco on 15 April 1964.

Castelo Branco became one of the leaders of the 1964 Brazilian coup d'état that overthrew Goulart and ended the Fourth Brazilian Republic. On 11 April, Congress chose him to serve out the remainder of Goulart's term and he took the oath of office on 15 April 1964.

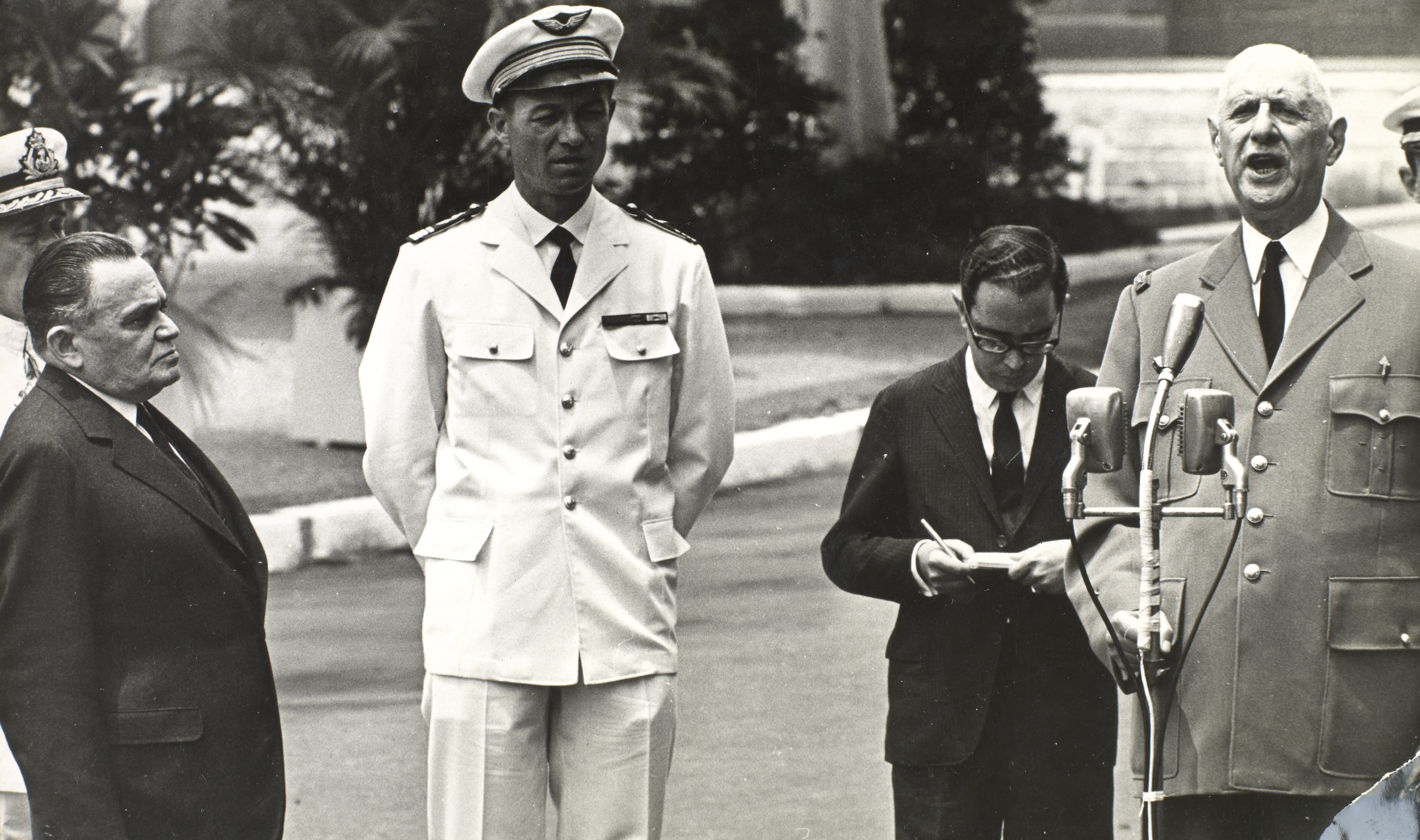
Castelo Branco (left) with French president Charles de Gaulle after the latter's arrival in Brazil, 1964

Castelo Branco was the second Brazilian field marshal to become president of the nation through a coup d'état, the first being Deodoro da Fonseca, who deposed Emperor Pedro II of Brazil in 1889, ended the Brazilian Empire and established the First Brazilian Republic.

Castelo Branco was vested with emergency powers under the First Institutional Act, which among other things allowed him to cancel the political rights of "subversive elements" for ten years. He was otherwise committed to permitting normal political activities while carrying out reform through legislation. In March 1965, municipal elections were held as planned. Castelo Branco had every intention of turning over power to a civilian president when his term was due to run out in 1966. However, the hard-line officers within the regime (known as linha-dura) with the support of War Minister Artur da Costa e Silva, wanted to stay in power for a greater period of time in order to achieve their political goals. Events reached a breaking point in October 1965, when opposition candidates won the governorships of the major states of Minas Gerais and Guanabara. Hard-liners demanded that Castelo Branco annul the results, but he refused. Another coup was averted after Costa e Silva persuaded hard-liners to recognize the election results in return for Castelo Branco's promise to implement a tougher policy.

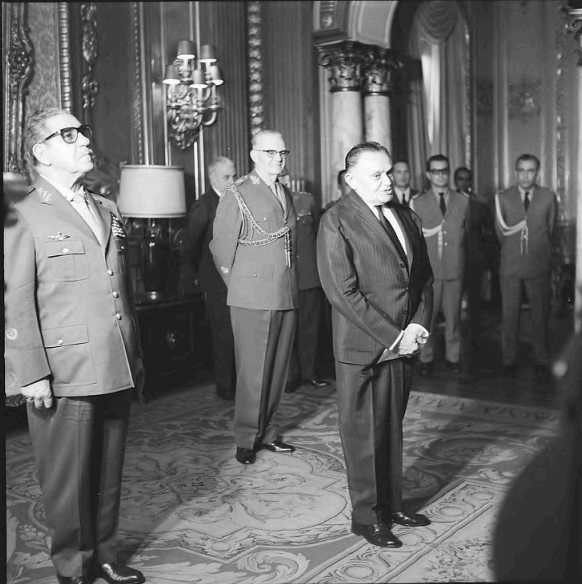
Castelo Branco with future presidents Artur da Costa e Silva and Ernesto Geisel during a military ceremony in the Laranjeiras Palace, 1966

Thereafter, Castelo Branco dropped all pretense of democracy. On 27 October 1965, he issued the Second Institutional Act, which abolished all existing political parties, restored his emergency powers, and extended his term to 1967. The numerous political parties were replaced with only two: the pro-government National Renewal Alliance Party (ARENA) and the opposition Brazilian Democratic Movement (MDB). In 1967, he convened an extraordinary commission of jurists that drafted a highly authoritarian constitution.

Castelo Branco issued many repressive laws, most notably a highly draconian press law (Lei de Imprensa) near the end of his term. This law continued to be valid in Brazil until 2009, when it was struck down by Brazil's Supreme Federal Court.

He was succeeded in the Presidency by Costa e Silva at midnight on 15 March 1967.

Castelo Branco promoted government intervention into the economy (e.g., shutting down by decree the country's flag carrier, Panair do Brasil). Castelo Branco's government unlike those of previous presidents was bankrolled from the start by the credits and loans from World Bank, International Monetary Fund and massive investment from multinational American companies, which saw the Brazilian right-wing military dictatorship as a new, economically stable Western ally against international communism in Latin America during the Cold War.

== Death ==
Four months after leaving the presidency, Castelo Branco died in a midair collision of Piper PA-23 aircraft near Fortaleza on 18 July 1967.

== Honours ==
=== Foreign honours ===
- (Portugal) Grand Officer of the Military Order of Aviz (12 October 1945)
- (France) Grand Cross of the Legion of Honour (14 October 1964)
- (Portugal) Grand Collar of the Order of Prince Henry (21 July 1965)
- (Italy) Grand Collar of the Order of Merit of the Italian Republic (8 September 1965)

== See also ==
- List of presidents of Brazil

== Notes ==
Military offices
| Preceded by Antonio José Coelho dos Reis | 24th ECEME Commander; 1954–1956 | Succeeded by Emílio Maurell Filho |
| Preceded by José Machado Lopes | 33rd Chief of the General Staff of the Army; 1963–1964 | Succeeded by Décio Palmeiro Escobar |
Political offices
| Preceded by Ranieri Mazzilli | 26th President of Brazil; 1964–1967 | Succeeded by Artur da Costa e Silva |
