= José Maria Alkmin =

Vice President of Brazil from 1964 to 1967

15th Vice President of Brazil
- In office 15 April 1964 – 15 March 1967
- President: Castelo Branco
- Preceded by: João Goulart
- Succeeded by: Pedro Aleixo
Executive offices
Secretary of Education of Minas Gerais
In office 14 April 1967 – 31 January 1970
Governor	Israel Pinheiro
Preceded by	Gerson de Brito Mello Boson
Succeeded by	Heráclito Mourão Miranda
Minister of Finance
In office 1 February 1956 – 24 June 1958
President	Juscelino Kubitschek
Preceded by	Mário Câmara
Succeeded by	Lucas Lopes
Legislative offices
Member of the Chamber of Deputies
In office 14 June 1973 – 22 April 1974
Constituency	Minas Gerais
In office 31 January 1970 – 1 February 1971
Constituency	Minas Gerais
In office 26 June 1958 – 15 April 1964
Constituency	Minas Gerais
In office 2 February 1955 – 1 January 1956
Constituency	Minas Gerais
In office 5 February 1946 – 14 March 1951
Constituency	Minas Gerais
In office 14 November 1933 – 10 September 1935
Constituency	Minas Gerais
Bureaucratic offices
Director of the Rediscount Portfolio of Banco do Brasil
In office 18 August 1953 – 6 September 1954
Preceded by	Egídio de Câmara Sousa
Succeeded by	Augusto Mário Caldeira Brant

Personal details
- Born: June 11, 1901 Bocaiúva, Minas Gerais, Brazil
- Died: April 22, 1974 (aged 72) Belo Horizonte, Minas Gerais, Brazil
- Party: PP (1933–1937); PSD (1945–1965); ARENA (1965–1974)
- Spouse: Maria Dasdores Fonseca
- Relations: Geraldo Alckmin (great-nephew)

José Maria Alkmin Filho (11 June 1901 – 22 April 1974) was the 15th vice president of Brazil from 1964 to 1967.

Alkmin was born in Bocaiúva. He served as Minister of Finance at various points from 1956 to 1958 before becoming vice president in 1964. He was also a deputy for the Partido Social Democrático on several occasions. He died in Belo Horizonte, aged 72.

Political offices
Preceded by Mário Câmara	Minister of Finance; 1956–1958	Succeeded by Lucas Lopes
Preceded by João Goulart	Vice President of Brazil; 1964–1967	Succeeded by Pedro Aleixo
