= João Goulart =

President of Brazil from 1961 to 1964

His Excellency João Goulart
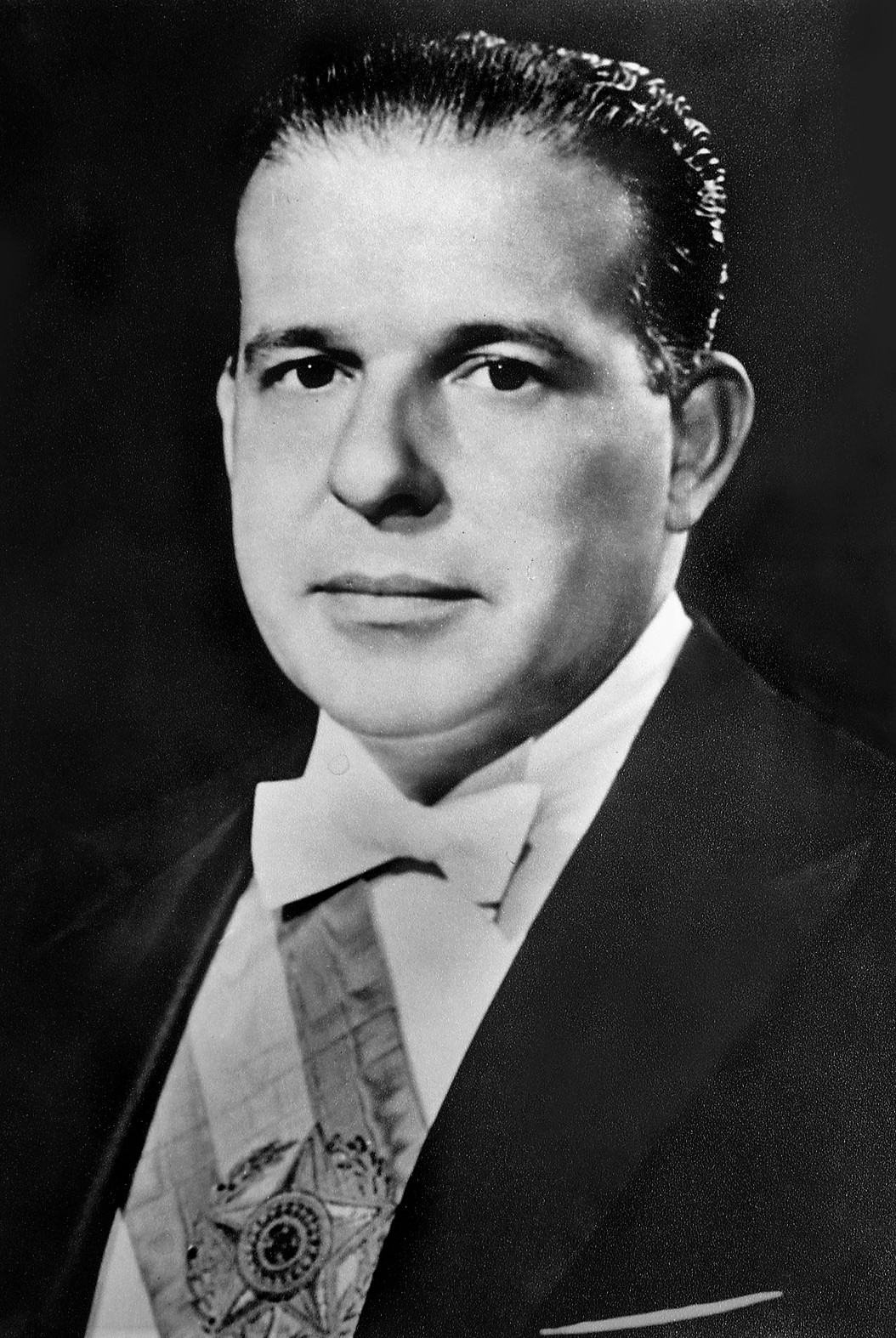
- Official portrait, 1961

24th President of Brazil
- In office 7 September 1961 – 2 April 1964
- Prime Minister: Tancredo Neves; Brochado da Rocha; Hermes Lima
- Vice President: None
- Preceded by: Ranieri Mazzilli
- Succeeded by: Ranieri Mazzilli

14th Vice President of Brazil
- In office 31 January 1956 – 25 August 1961
- President: Juscelino Kubitschek (1956–1961); Jânio Quadros (Jan–Aug 1961)
- Preceded by: Café Filho
- Succeeded by: José Maria Alkmin
Executive offices
Minister of Labour, Industry and Trade
In office 18 June 1953 – 23 February 1954
President	Getúlio Vargas
Preceded by	José de Segadas Viana
Succeeded by	Hugo de Araújo Faria
Secretary of the Interior and Justice of Rio Grande do Sul
In office 31 January 1951 – 23 March 1952
Governor	Ernesto Dornelles
Preceded by	Oscar Carneiro da Fontoura
Succeeded by	Egídio Michaelsen
Legislative offices
Member of the Chamber of Deputies
In office 23 February 1954 – 3 February 1955
Constituency	Rio Grande do Sul
In office 23 March 1952 – 18 June 1953
Constituency	Rio Grande do Sul
In office 11 March 1951 – 25 March 1951
Constituency	Rio Grande do Sul
State Deputy of Rio Grande do Sul
In office 10 March 1947 – 31 January 1951
Constituency	At-large
Party political offices
President of the Brazilian Labour Party
In office 20 May 1952 – 19 May 1965
Preceded by	Dinarte Dornelles
Succeeded by	Lutero Vargas

Personal details
- Born: 1 March 1919 São Borja, Rio Grande do Sul, Brazil
- Died: 6 December 1976 (aged 57) Mercedes, Corrientes, Argentina
- Cause of death: Heart attack (official); Poisoning (theorized)
- Resting place: Cemitério Jardim da Paz; São Borja, Rio Grande do Sul, Brazil
- Party: PTB (1946–1965)
- Spouse: Maria Teresa Fontela (m. 1955)
- Relations: Neusinha Brizola (niece)
- Children: João Vicente Goulart (b. 1956); Denise Goulart (b. 1957)
- João Goulart's voice João Goulart's oath during his inauguration (recorded 1961)

João Belchior Marques Goulart (Note: English: /ˈʒwaʊn/ ZHWOWN, Brazilian Portuguese: [ʒuˈɐ̃w̃ bewkiˈɔʁ ˈmaʁkiz ɡuˈlaʁ].) (1 March 1919 – 6 December 1976), commonly known as Jango, was a Brazilian politician who served as the 24th president of Brazil from 1961 until a military coup d'état deposed him in 1964. He was considered the last left-wing president of Brazil until Luiz Inácio Lula da Silva took office in 2003.

== Name ==
João Goulart was nicknamed Jango (pronounced [ˈʒɐ̃ɡu]), a common nickname for João in the south of Brazil. The Jânio Quadros–João Goulart presidential bid was thus called Jan–Jan (an amalgamation of Jânio and Jango).

His childhood nickname was Janguinho (little Jango). Years later, when he entered politics, he was supported and advised by Getúlio Vargas, and his friends and colleagues started to call him Jango. In his informality and affection, Getúlio Vargas also called him Janguinho.

His grandfather, Belchior Rodrigues Goulart, descended from Portuguese immigrants from the Azores who arrived in Rio Grande do Sul in the second half of the 19th century.

== Early life ==
Goulart was born at Yguariaçá Farm, in Itacurubi, São Borja, Rio Grande do Sul, on 1 March 1919. His parents were Vicentina Marques Goulart, a housewife, and Vicente Rodrigues Goulart, an estancieiro (a rancher who owned large rural properties) who had been a National Guard colonel fighting on the side of Governor Borges de Medeiros during the 1923 Revolution. Most sources indicate that João was born in 1918, but his birth year is actually 1919; his father ordered a second birth certificate adding a year to his son's age so that he could attend the law school at the Universidade Federal do Rio Grande do Sul.

Yguariaçá Farm was isolated and his mother had no medical care at his birth, only the assistance of her mother, Maria Thomaz Vasquez Marques. According to João's sister Yolanda, "my grandmother was the one able to revive little João who, at birth, already looked like he was dying." Like most Azorean descendants, Maria Thomaz was a devout Catholic. While trying to revive her grandson, warming him, she prayed to John the Baptist, promising that if the newborn survived, he would be his namesake and would not cut his hair until the age of three, when he would march in the procession of 24 June dressed as the saint. Following the beliefs of the region, his mother dressed him in women's clothes in his first year of life (cf. breeching).

João grew up as a skinny boy in Yguariaçá along with his six sisters, Eufrides, Maria, Nair, Yolanda, Cila, and Neuza. Both of his younger brothers died prematurely. Rivadávia (born 1920) died of meningitis in childhood, and Ivan (born 1925), to whom he was deeply attached, died of leukemia at 33.

João left for the nearby town of Itaqui, because his father Vicente wished to form a partnership with Protásio Vargas, Getúlio's brother, after both leased a small refrigerator house (a cold storage business) in Itaqui from an English businessman. While Vicente ran the business for the following years, João attended the [boarding] school of the Teresian Sisters of Mary, along with his sisters. Although it was a co-educational school during the day, he could not stay overnight at the boarding school with his sisters; he had to sleep at the house of an English couple, who were friends of his family. It was in Itaqui that João developed a taste for both football and swimming.

Upon his return to São Borja, ending his experience as a partner in the refrigerator house, Vicente sent João to the Ginásio Santana, run by the Marist Brothers in Uruguaiana. João attended first to fourth grade at the Santana boarding school, but failed the fifth grade in 1931. Angry with his son's poor achievements at school, Vicente sent him to attend the Colégio Anchieta in Porto Alegre. In the state capital, João lived at a pension with friends Almir Palmeiro and Abadé dos Santos Ayub, the latter of whom was very attached to him.

Aware of João's football skills at school, where he played the right-back position, Almir and Abadé convinced him to try out for Sport Club Internacional. João was selected for the club's juvenile team. In 1932, he became a juvenile state champion. That same year, he finished the third grade of the ginásio (high school) at Colégio Anchieta, with an irregular academic record that would be repeated when he attended the law school at Rio Grande do Sul Federal University. João graduated from high school at Ginásio Santana after being sent back to Uruguaiana.

As a businessman, he built his fortune between 1941 and 1945, making loans at the National Bank of Commerce, Bank of Rio Grande do Sul, and Bank of Brazil, using as collateral all the cattle he had. With this he generated a fortune in cattle, of US$506,630.001 in 1946. Despite ascending to this position, he was a kind man with his employees and humble with those in need, and he did not accept any kind of discrimination.

== Political career ==
Sent back to Porto Alegre after graduating from high school, Goulart attended law school to satisfy his father, who desired that he earn a degree. While there, Goulart restored contact with his youth friends Abadé Ayub and Salvador Arísio, and made new friends and explored the state capital's nightlife. It was during that time of a bohemian lifestyle that Goulart acquired a venereal disease, syphilis, which paralyzed his left knee almost entirely. He paid for expensive medical treatment, including a surgery in São Paulo, but he expected that he would never walk normally again. Because of the paralysis of his knee, Goulart graduated separately from the rest of his class in 1939. He would never fully practice law.

After graduating, Goulart returned to São Borja. According to Yolanda Goulart, his depression because of the leg problem was visible. He isolated himself at Yguariaçá Farm. According to his sister Yolanda, his depression did not last long. In the early 1940s, he decided to make fun of his own walking disability in the Carnival, participating in the parade of the block Comigo Ninguém Pode.

=== Beginning at PTB ===
Goulart's father died in 1943, and he inherited rural properties that made him one of the most influential estancieiros (ranchers) of the region. Upon the resignation of President Getúlio Vargas and his return to São Borja in October 1945, Goulart was already a wealthy man. He did not need to enter politics to rise socially, but the frequent meetings with Vargas, a close friend of his father, were decisive in Goulart's pursuit of a public life.

The first invitation Goulart received to enter a political party was made by Protásio Vargas, Getúlio's brother, who was in charge of organizing the Social Democratic Party (Partido Social Democrático – PSD) in São Borja. Goulart declined but later accepted Getúlio Vargas's invitation to join the Brazilian Labour Party (Partido Trabalhista Brasileiro – PTB). He was the first president of the local PTB, and would later become the statewide, then national, president of the party.

In 1947, Getúlio Vargas convinced Goulart to run for a seat in the state assembly. He was elected with 4,150 votes, becoming the fifth-most of 23 deputies. He received more votes than had his future brother-in-law Leonel Brizola, another rising star of the PTB, who was married to Goulart's sister Neusa until her death in 1993. Goulart was not an active member of the assembly, only speaking once on the defensive interests of small cattle farmers in São Borja. He soon became a confidant and political protégé of Vargas, becoming one of the party members who most insistently urged him to launch a presidential candidacy for the 1950 elections. On 18 April 1950, (Note: In an unofficial way, Goulart had announced Vargas's candidacy a year before.) Goulart launched Vargas's candidacy for president and, in the next day, a birthday party was held for the former president at Granja São Vicente, which was owned by Goulart.

In 1950, Goulart was elected to the Chamber of Deputies. He received 39,832 votes, second-most in the PTB in Rio Grande do Sul, and took office as a deputy in February 1951. He soon became secretary of the interior and a justice in the administration of Governor Ernesto Dornelles. During his time as secretary, which lasted until 7 March 1952, Goulart restructured the prison system to improve the living conditions of prisoners. He later resigned his job as secretary, at the request of Vargas, to help the president with a political deadlock at the ministry of labor, using his influence on the labor-union movement.

=== Minister of Labor ===
In 1953, after becoming aggravated with the deadlock, Vargas appointed Goulart minister of labor. The Vargas administration was in a deep crisis; the workers, unsatisfied with their low wages, were promoting strikes, and the right-wing party National Democratic Union (União Democrática Nacional – UDN) was mobilizing a coup d'état among the mass media, the upper-middle class, and the military forces.

As he took office, Goulart replied to accusations from several newspapers, including The New York Times. As minister of labor, Goulart held the first Brazilian Congress of Social Security. He signed a series of decrees favoring social security, such as housing financing, regulation of loans by the Institute of Retirement and Pensions of Bank Employees (Instituto de Aposentadoria e Pensões dos Bancários – IAPB), and recognizing the employees of the Audit Committee of the Institute of Retirement and Pensions of Industry Employees (Conselho Fiscal do Instituto de Aposentadoria e Pensões dos Industriários).

In his time in the ministry, as witnessed by Hugo de Faria, João Goulart was willing to wear out his prestige with the Minister of Finance in defense of the working class. Goulart was willing to take money out of his own pocket to help anyone who asked for help, but he was " half greedy" with the public money, as his minister-administrative, Hugo de Faria, said, and elected Hugo de Faria to participate in the formalities in his place - Hugo considered him one of the "most patient men in the world" in his dealings with the general public and according to historian Jorge Ferreira: "The minister soon became known for his sincere way of not discriminating against people."

The way he received "workers, unionists and ordinary people" in his office shocked the conservative civil and military sectors, in something that mixed so much class and ethnic prejudice. As a minister, he also opted for negotiations between strikers and bosses, rather than repressive methods. In response to the accusation that he would oppose the capitalist regime, he said that he was always willing to applaud the capitalists who invested in the means of production and who legally "created wealth in a social, human and patriotic sense," but that he was against "parasitic, speculative, exorbitant and short-sighted capitalism in profit".

In late 1953, Goulart began studies for review of the minimum wage, facing two types of pressure: the mobilization of workers in larger cities to claim a readjustment of 100% that would increase the minimum wage from ₢$1,200 to ₢$2,400, and entrepreneurs' refusal to review the policy since the Eurico Gaspar Dutra administration, which allegedly contributed to the impoverishment of several segments of the Brazilian society. The business community said that it would agree to a 42% raise in the minimum wage to match the cost of living in 1951. On May Day, Vargas signed the new minimum wage into law, which was a 100% increase as demanded by the working class.

On 22 February 1954, Goulart handed his resignation letter to President Vargas, (Note: Even with his resignation, the workers and the union movement still carried out actions, such as the unionists petition on 1 May 1954, defending his return.) and Vargas named Hugo de Faria to succeed him in an interim manner, and resumed his term as a federal deputy, as a result of the strong reaction of the media and military against the new minimum wage.

The political crisis of the Vargas administration deepened after one of his bodyguards was involved in an assassination attempt against UDN leader Carlos Lacerda on 5 August 1954. Vargas was put under pressure by the media, which demanded his resignation. On the early morning of 24 August 1954, Vargas called Goulart to Catete Palace and handed him a document to be read only after he arrived back in Rio Grande do Sul. It was his suicide letter Carta Testamento.

=== Between Vargas and the Vice Presidency ===
==== Decision to proceed ====
After the suicide of Vargas, from whom he received a copy of the Carta Testamento, Goulart became very depressed, thought about moving away from politics and, according to Maria Thereza, it took him two months to recover from the shock, after retreating to his resort in São Borja and taking care of business. At Vargas' funeral, Goulart declared that "We, within order and law, will know how to fight with patriotism and dignity, inspired by the example you bequeathed to us".

Goulart decided to continue in politics after receiving a letter from Oswaldo Aranha, delivered by Leonel Brizola and José Gomes Talarico. In October, Goulart participated in the legislative elections, but was defeated.

After Vargas's suicide, a new generation started to make PTB grow. This generation led by Goulart turned the PTB into a party of "reformist features", in a direction that came to radicalize until 1964.

In order to gain power as President of the PTB, Goulart began to concentrate in the National Directory people loyal to him, thus transforming the PTB into one of the parties "most undemocratic and centralized in the Brazilian political framework," in the words of historian Jorge Ferreira. However, Goulart helped the party have a more consistent political and ideological profile. Goulart and the PTB also reinvented the trabalhismo for the context of their generation, more concerned with social causes.

==== 1955 elections and wedding ====
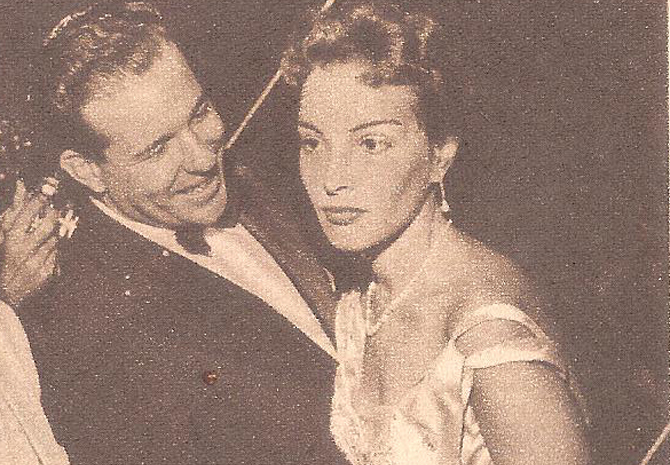
Goulart and Maria Thereza in 1956.

Willing to hold elections in October 1955, President Café Filho tried to present, after a military suggestion, a "national union" candidate. In response to conservative groups, the PSD put forward Juscelino Kubitschek as a presidential candidate. Goulart's candidacy for the vice presidency caused controversy in conservative groups such as the Armed Forces, a feeling that increased after the General Secretary of the Brazilian Communist Party Luís Carlos Prestes voiced his support.

In April 1955 the party agreement was approved. Within the PTB there was disapproval of Goulart's control and fear that the coalition would provoke a military coup, but Goulart succeeded in dialogue among parties, doing things like demanding federal positions for sectors of the PTB.

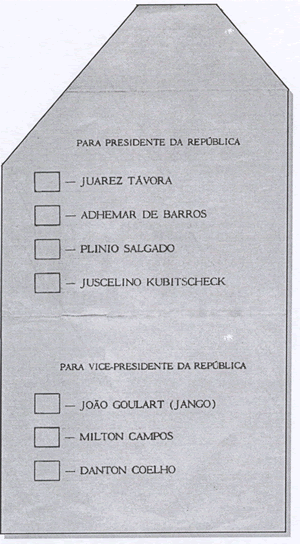
First official ballot, with candidates for president and vice president.

In an attempt to remove Kubitschek, President Café Filho told him to withdraw his candidacy or there would be a military coup, which Kubitschek refused. Civil and military groups preached the coup. A large part of the media in Rio de Janeiro positioned itself on legality and the Minister of War, General Henrique Teixeira Lott, sought to keep the Armed Forces out of the crisis. Army officials spoke openly about coups in the Tribuna da Imprensa, while Aeronautics began helping Kubitschek and Goulart with the campaign.

Due to the impossibility of assuming the position as a bachelor, Goulart had to get married. However, Maria Thereza, then 17, felt insecure and took a while to accept the idea, which was already arranged. The civil ceremony took place on 14 May 1955, but it was by proxy, as a storm prevented Goulart's plane from arriving. Four days later the religious wedding took place, followed by a short honeymoon due to the campaign.

In the same year, Carlos Lacerda, in Congress, denounced Goulart, saying that Goulart was stockpiling weapons. However, an investigation showed that the weapons were stolen by an army officer and passed on to Lacerda. (Note: In another episode at the same period, the "Brandi Letter" supposedly showed that Goulart was smuggling weapons across the border with Argentina, and president of the Military Commission of Inquiry Maurell Filho concluded that the signature of Antonio Brandi had been grossly forged and two days earlier the person responsible for the forgery had been arrested in Rio Grande do Sul, claiming he had been coerced by Carlos Lacerda.) Despite the demonstrations against him, Kubitschek was elected president of Brazil with 37% of the votes on 3 October, and Goulart was elected as vice president with more than 44% of the vote. Following this, the UDN began to fight against their inauguration.

==== Lott vs Luz ====
Video from TV Senado about the event (eng. subs)

With Armed Forces officers in favor of an institutional breakdown, General Euclides Zenóbio da Costa issued a statement around the legality surrounding General Henrique Teixeira Lott. However, following the discipline, Lott punished Euclides for this act.

In November 1955, President Café Filho, due to a heart crisis, was replaced by Carlos Luz, who was close to conservative groups interested in the coup.

Officials in favor of the coup took over the Armed Forces, and Lott joined with legalist troops in a countercoup against Carlos Luz, where they expected no bloodshed. (Note: At the funeral of Canrobert Pereira da Costa, Colonel Jurandir Mamede gave a speech that was "challenging of hierarchy and military discipline". When the newly sworn-in President Luz decided against punishment, Lott asked for his resignation.) Luz was impeached by the Deputy Chamber, thus allowing Nereu Ramos to assume power. Luz and 11 other people then went to Santos on the Tamandaré cruiser in order to establish the government there.

When Nereu assumed power, Luz did not get support from the Governor of São Paulo Jânio Quadros, and when he realized that the leaders of Army groups were legalists, he ended the coup attempt. There were no punishments and Luz was impeached. With the successful counter-coup, Lott gained prestige.

After leaving the hospital, Café Filho tried to return to the presidency, but was impeached by Congress, which also voted for a one-month state of emergency, until Kubitschek and Goulart took office on 31 January 1956.

=== Vice-President ===
==== JK–Jango ====
Vice President Goulart (right) at the inauguration of Juscelino Kubitschek on 31 January 1956.

At the inauguration, Kubitschek, after receiving the banner and greeting the people, ordered the gates to be opened. Goulart and Kubitschek had a similar tact in contact with the humble people, but at first Kubitschek, jealous of Goulart's election result, tried to isolate him politically. but he went back, and as Hugo de Faria said, Goulart didn't want to run for president. Goulart did not allow anyone to disrespectfully speak of Kubitschek.

For his ability to negotiate with the trade union movement, Goulart was largely responsible for the political stability of the JK government. However, due to this contact, conservative groups accused him of being a strike promoter. Nevertheless, Goulart acted as a negotiator and supporter of the Kubitschek government in the union area. João Goulart used to receive union leaders in his home for meetings, which also represented a union between communists and trabalhists for the workers.

As vice-president, Goulart was also President of the Federal Senate of Brazil, in accordance with the 1946 Constitution. In the JK Government, the PTB occupied the ministries of Labor, Agriculture and Goulart nominated the first level of Social Security.

As a result of the countercoup, in March 1956 the Frente de Novembro was founded by Colonel Canabarro Lucas, with legalist, nationalist, and left-wing military personnel, led by Lott (declared anti-communist) and with Vice-President João Goulart as "President of Honor". The group began to rival right-wing groups.

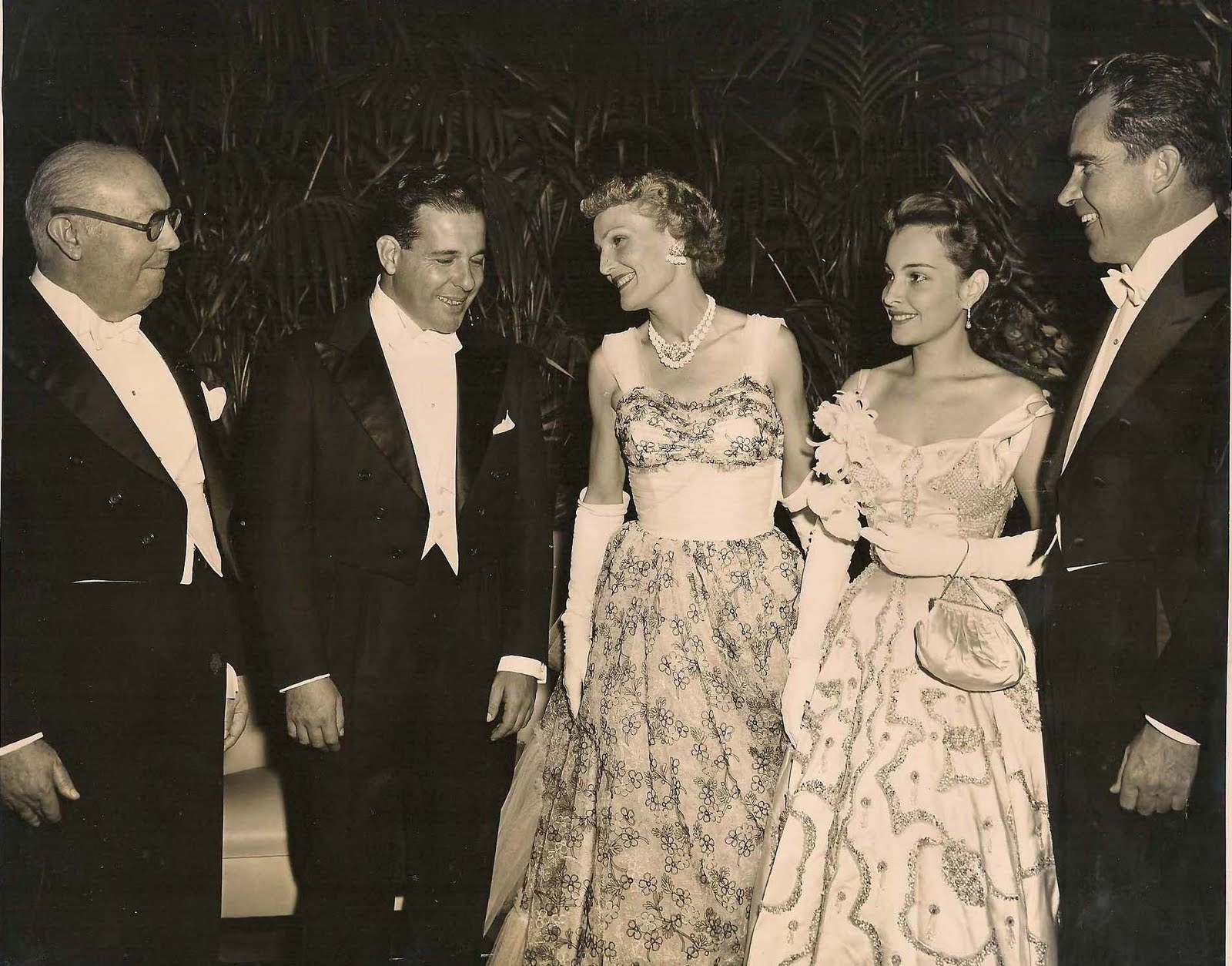
Maria Thereza, Jango, Pat Nixon, Richard Nixon and João Carlos Muniz, in 1956.

In April 1956, Goulart went to the U.S., in return for Richard Nixon's visit, where he also discussed the issue of communism, which in his view was a matter of internal concern for Brazil, while for the United States this was a problem that concerned them both in the diplomatic and military spheres. After his visit to the United States, he went, with his wife, to Canada and unofficially to Europe, Mexico, and Uruguay. There was an attempted military coup two weeks after the inauguration. In July 1956, he assumed the interim presidency of the Republic due to a trip by Kubitschek to Panama and left that position with his return on the 27th. Lacerda exposed another complaint against Goulart, that ended nowhere.

Economically Goulart was in favor of avoiding US dependence on foreign trade. Within the PTB, several members were expelled due to their criticism. Due to functional precariousness, subordinates in the Armed Forces began to approach the trade unions. Despite the conservative officiality, there were nationalist officers and in 1956, the sergeants achieved their stability. Despite being in power, the PTB acted as the opposition, voicing open criticism of the government.

Maria Thereza Goulart.

During this time João Vicente and Denise were born. Despite his position, Goulart had no bodyguard. In contrast to his progressive views in the political field, in private life he was a traditional man, especially in the dynamics between husband and wife, making Maria Thereza have to stand up for herself. However, with the birth of his children, he became an active and loving father, and improved his relationship with Maria Thereza, which according to her, was when he assumed an active role as a husband. However, Goulart had several extramarital affairs.

One year after the preventive coup, Goulart participated in the tributes to General Lott, who received a golden sword. By not allowing other officers to make political statements, Lott caused a crisis that ended with Kubitschek putting both the Frente de Novembro and the Clube da Lanterna into illegality.

In 1959, commercial relations with the USSR were resumed due to the expansion of African coffee.

At the end of the government, the economy became unstable and in the difficulty of implementing measures that would help the poorest sectors of the population, Goulart began to believe that the 1946 Constitution no longer represented social reality.

In the same year, discussions on candidacies for the next elections began. Kubitschek planned to introduce Juracy Magalhães as a candidate, planning to return after five years, but was frustrated on 5 May with the introduction of Jânio Quadros's candidacy.

In February 1959, Lott's candidacy was introduced, but Goulart considered him to be a weak candidate. However, in February 1960, the PTB homologated Marshal Lott's candidacy, with Goulart as Vice-President. For researcher Maria Celina D'Araujo, the PTB "sought a militarized democracy, through the alliance of military units, union and party..."

Due to Lott's electoral weakness, the informal candidacy "Jan-Jan", or "Jânio-Jango", appeared. Due to Quadros's threats to give up the candidacy and rumors that Brizola would stage a coup d'état, Brazilian Air Force rebels attempted a military coup in what became known as the Aragarças Revolt, which did not get adhesions and the officers went into exile abroad. As expected, the "Jan-Jan" ticket won.

==== Jan-Jan ====
Quadros inherited a bankrupt country and in the inauguration ceremony, with his formalism, tried to mark his distance from the vice president. Quadros created a conservative ministry composed of military personnel, made moral prohibitions – such as banning the wearing of bikinis on television – and in foreign policy sought to be independent, which caused sympathy from the left.

In commissions initiated to "punish acts of corruption and embezzlement of public money," Goulart was hit by investigations that pointed to him as a beneficiary of electoral propaganda and had his response denied by the president.

The PTB came to take its side of opposition and left, also approaching the PCB and due to criticism on the right and left, along with dissatisfaction with the investigations, Quadros became more and more isolated in the National Congress. The Goulart family came to live at Granja do Torto in the recently inaugurated, but still incomplete, Brasília. In December 1960, accompanied by his advisor, journalist Raul Riff, he visited Czechoslovakia. StB (Czech intelligence) kept itself informed in detail about his government.

==== Visit to China ====
Despite reservations, Goulart accepted the invitation of the Minister of Foreign Affairs, Afonso Arinos (Note: José Ermírio de Moraes was the first option, but refused.) to head a trade mission to China in July 1961. On a scale in the USSR, Goulart was received with honors as Head of State by Nikita Khrushchev, where he also met cosmonaut Gherman Titov, who had just carried out the mission Vostok 2 and Yuri Gagarin.

In Beijing, among other things, Goulart spoke "for the daily increase of friendship between the Brazilian and Chinese people". According to Evandro Lins e Silva, when speaking for the friendship of the two peoples, "the West saw it as a declaration of support for communism".

On his last day in the capital, Mao Tse-tung visited him at the Beijing Hotel to say goodbye, an unprecedented act. On 24 August, the Brazilian media published a letter from Goulart to President Quadros announcing the success of the mission in China. The next day, Quadros had resigned.

==== Quadros resignation ====
Quadros resigned hoping that his vice-president, who was aligned with the left, would not be accepted, and that in turn Quadros would remain in power. However, the National Congress accepted the resignation.

At the suggestion of Quadros, military ministers Odílio Denys (army), Gabriel Grün Moss (air force), and Silvio Heck (navy) formed a military junta. President of Chamber of Deputies Ranieri Mazzilli took interim office as Brazilian President and read to Congress a communiqué from military ministers in which they said Goulart would be arrested if he returned to Brazil. The military expected the National Congress to declare Goulart's impeachment which did not happen.

Due to the time zone, Goulart knew about the resignation in the early hours of 26 August. For Senator Diz-Huit Rosado, Goulart did not seem to be intimidated. When he arrived in France and learned more details, Hugo de Faria said that Goulart thought of resigning, but gave up with the attempted military coup.

==== Legality Campaign ====
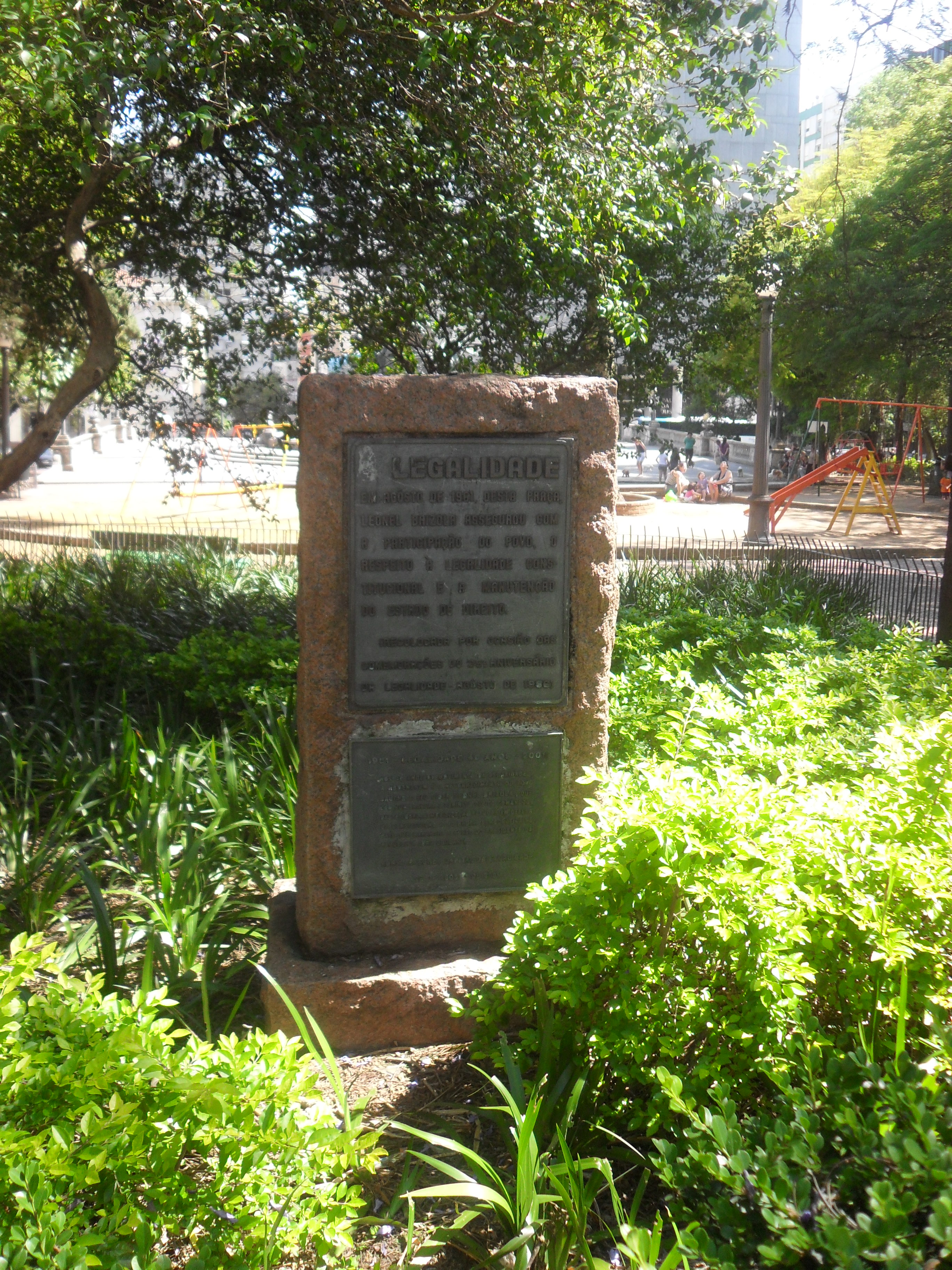
"Legality: In August 1961, from this square, Leonel Brizola assured with the participation of the people, the respect for the constitutional legality and the maintenance of the rule of law".

On the morning of 25 August, after having confirmed the resignation of Quadros, Brizola began to act. Marshal Lott, speaking in favor of the law, was arrested-as were also several officers of the Three Forces.

With the support of some colonels and the public, Brizola started the Legality Campaign. On the morning of the 26th, "the country dawned in an unofficial state of siege", according to Jorge Ferreira.

On the 27th, in Zurich, Goulart learned by telephone through Brizola about the threat of imprisonment, which did not deter him from returning. On the same day, the headquarters of the III Army announced to Brasília the actions of Brizola, and the next day there was the risk of bombing. Brizola made a transmission announcing the visit of the commander of the III Army Machado Lopes. The military started to search airplanes throughout the country in search of Goulart.

The Legality Chain began to be transmitted throughout Brazil and abroad, despite the federal government's attempt at censorship, gaining international sympathy and national public adherence.

In Paris, on 28 August, Goulart's public statements were superficial, as he knew little about the situation in Brazil, but with the arrival of Congressman Carlos Jereissati, he decided to delay his return, sensing a civil war. By telephone, San Tiago Dantas spoke of the "possibility of the collapse of the democratic regime in Brazil" and Kubitschek gave the idea of parliamentarianism, which Goulart accepted as a non-violent option.

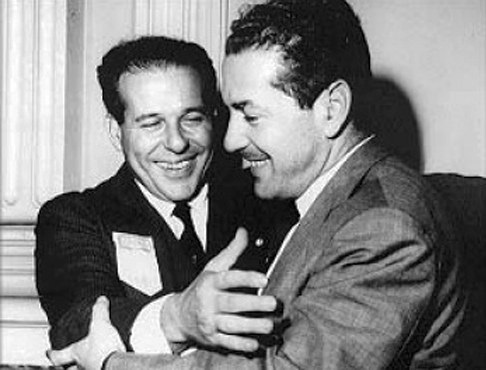
Jango and Brizola.

In Rio Grande do Sul, Machado Lopes put the III Army in favor of legality, temporarily avoiding a civil war. In reprisal, Odílio Denys dismissed him from command.

On the 28th, Goulart was still in Paris receiving news. On 29 August, Goulart embarked from Paris to New York and on the same day the National Congress rejected his impeachment.

In Argentina, Goulart was isolated from the public and his family by the military. From there, he boarded a DC-3 to Montevideo. There, keeping with Brizola's plan, there was a plane with national and international journalists to prevent the army from taking him down. In "Manifesto to the Nation" on 30 August, the military ministers spoke about the "inconvenience of Jango's return to the country".

On the 31st, the risk of civil war increased, as soldiers from all over the country stood by the law and there was a risk of conflict between the forces of Brizola and the government. At Canoas Air Base insubordinate sergeants punctured the tires and disarmed the planes that would be used in the bombing of the Piratini Palace.

In the National Congress, the parliamentary amendment was put on the voting agenda. Since the resignation of Quadros, the police had reacted violently against demonstrators, with Guanabara suffering the harshest repression. In the Chamber of Deputies, deputy Adauto Lúcio Cardoso spoke in favor of impeachment of Mazilli and military ministers for crime of responsibility.

On 1 September, Tancredo Neves and others went to Uruguay to meet with Goulart, who kept Brizola and Lopes updated on what they discussed. According to Tancredo Neves, Goulart had resistance to parliamentarianism, but ended up accepting due to the risk of deaths. The military was against Goulart speaking to the people and Brizola going into inauguration and in the early morning of the same day, the National Congress approved the parliamentary amendment.

On the evening of the same day, a Varig plane landed at Salgado Filho airport with Goulart. Despite the desire of the population, he did not speak to the people and men from the press had resistance against the idea of accepting parliamentarianism, and the people became stressed. Despite wanting to march on Brasília and close the National Congress, upset, Brizola accepted the decision of his brother-in-law.

Groups of FAB officers planned Operation Mosquito, which was not carried out, as an attempt to kill Goulart. The plane that transported Goulart to Brasília flew at 11,100 meters of altitude, thus being out of range of the fighters. Goulart arrived in the capital on 5 September and took office on 7 September.

== The Goulart administration ==
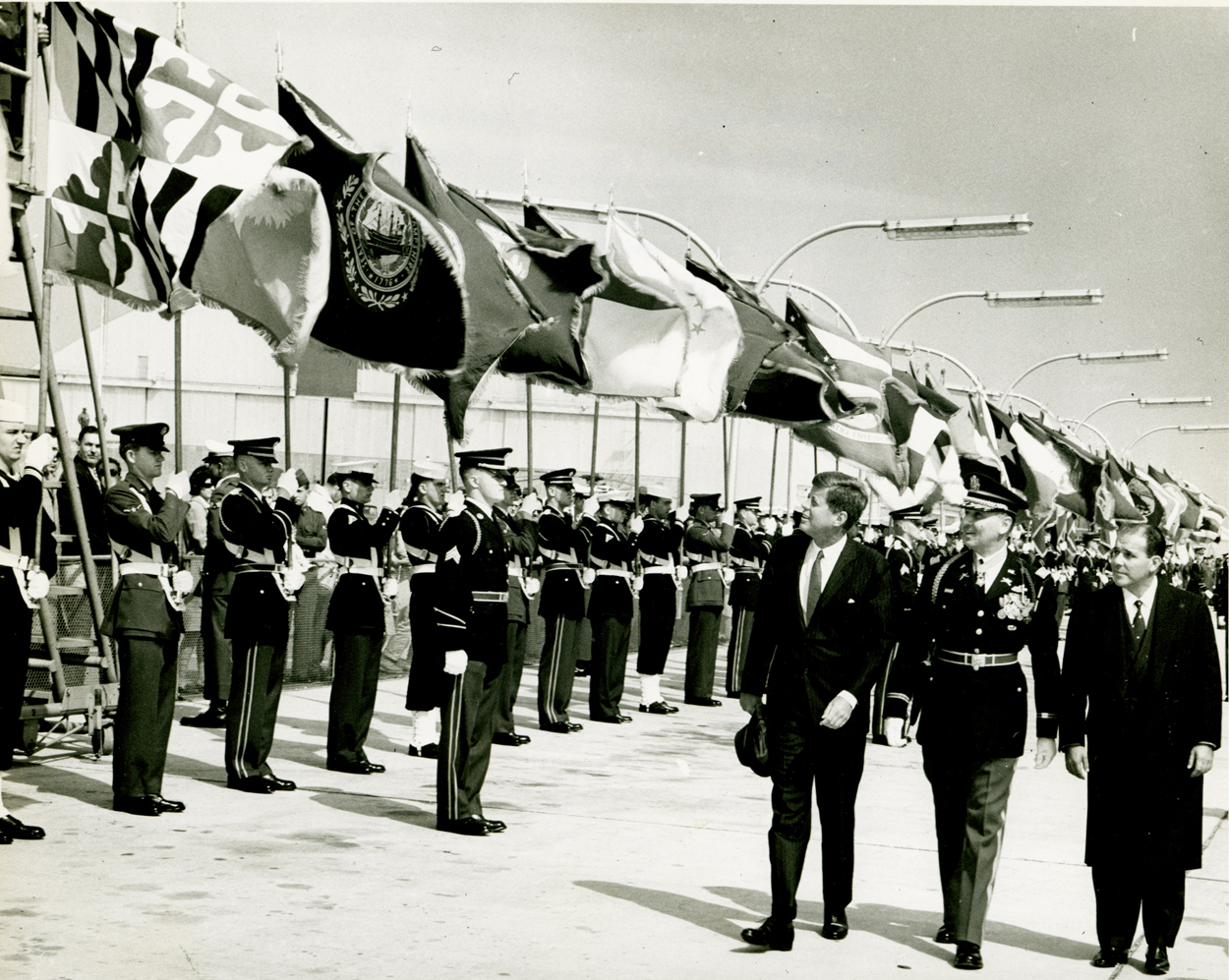
Goulart with U.S. President John F. Kennedy during a visit to the United States in April 1962.

In his inauguration speech, he called for "unity, democracy and reform". Goulart took over the country in a military crisis, external and internal debts and powerless to carry out his reformist projects, but having a majority in the National Congress, he hoped to be successful on the basis of agreements, besides showing the unfeasibility of the new system of government.

The first cabinet, called "National Conciliation", was appointed on 8 September and with Tancredo Neves as prime minister. On 26 June 1962, the first cabinet resigned to run in the October elections. Brochado da Rocha had his appointment as prime minister approved by Congress on 10 July. Brochado resigned and Hermes Lima was sworn in on 19 September 1962.

During this period, Goulart and his prime minister chose the three-year plan as the economic plan of his government under the advisement of Celso Furtado, his minister of planning. In order to strengthen the energy sector and to foster Brazilian development, Eletrobrás, Latin America's largest power utility company, was created in 1962.

As part of the compromise that installed a parliamentary system of government in 1961, a plebiscite was set for 1963 to confirm or reverse the changes made to the constitution. The parliamentary system of government was overwhelmingly rejected in the referendum, and Goulart assumed full presidential powers.

The presidential government of Goulart initiated in 1963 was marked politically by the administration's closer ties to center-left political groups, and conflict with more conservative sectors of the society, specifically the National Democratic Union.

Goulart also led Brazil in the drive for a nuclear-free Latin America, providing the impetus for the Five Presidents' Declaration and the Treaty of Tlatelolco. Brazil's leadership on nuclear disarmament was a casualty of the military coup, and Mexico eventually stepped in to continue to drive for a nuclear-free region.

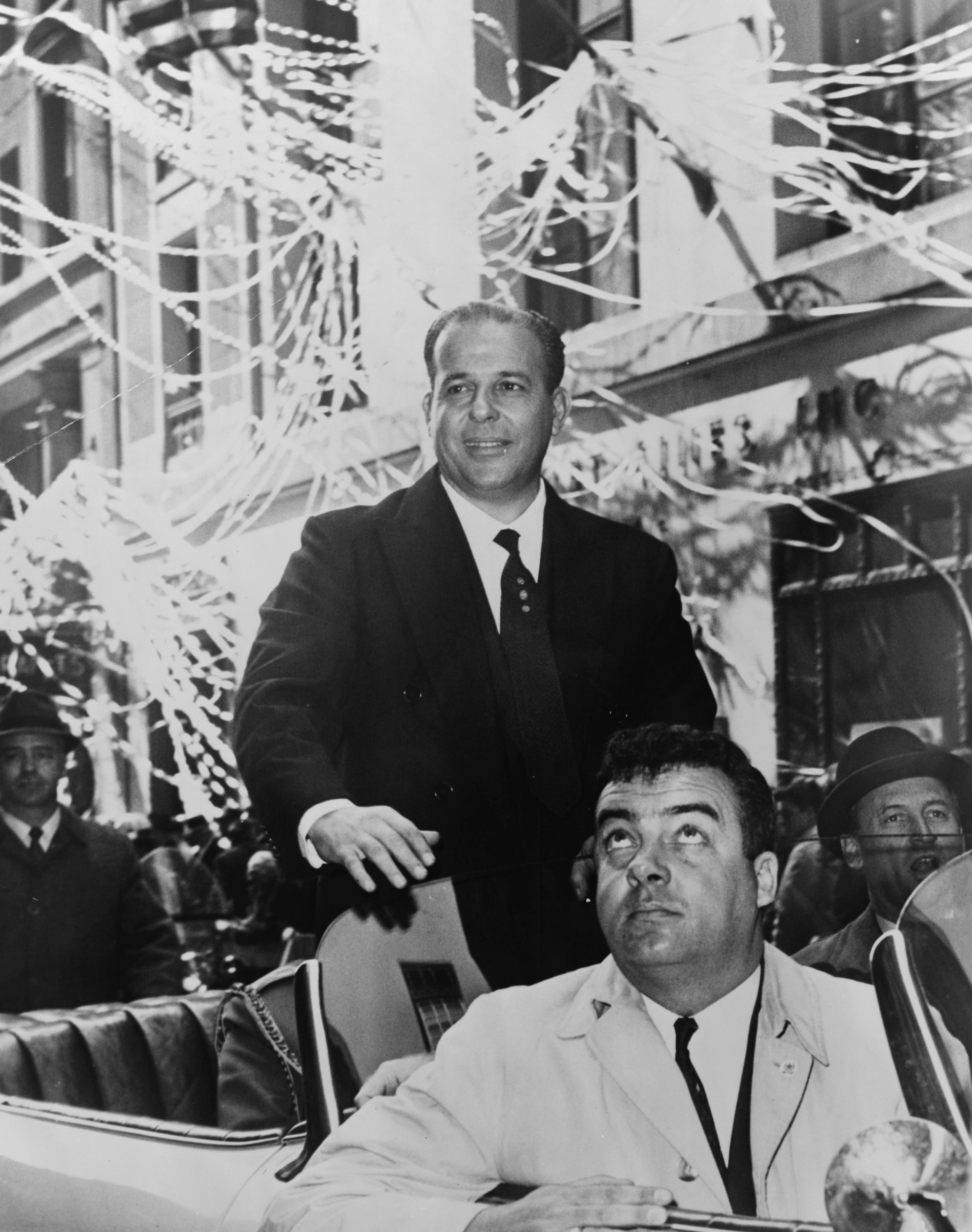
A ticker tape parade for Goulart in New York City, 1962.

=== Basic reforms ===
Goulart's Basic Reforms plan (Reformas de Base) was a group of social and economic measures of nationalist character that ushered in a greater state intervention in the economy. Among the reforms were:

- Education reform to combat adult illiteracy, with the widespread use of the pioneering teachings and method of Paulo Freire. The government also proposed to hold a university reform and prohibited the operation of private schools. Fifteen percent of Brazil's income would be directed to education.
- Tax reform to control the transfer of profits by multinational companies with headquarters abroad, instead reinvesting profits in Brazil. The income tax would be proportional to personal profit.
- Electoral reform to extend voting rights to illiterate people and low-ranking military officers.
- Land reform to expropriate and redistribute non-productive properties larger than 600 hectares to the population. At that time, the agricultural population was larger than the urban population.

==== Cuba, 1962 ====
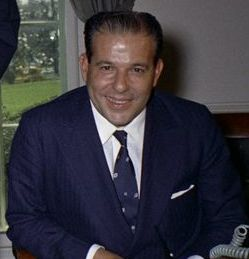
João Goulart in 1962

With the Cuban Missile Crisis, Kennedy sent a letter to Goulart proposing the participation of the Brazilian military in the possible invasion of the island. In response, Goulart demonstrated that he opposed this plan and instead supported the self-determination of the peoples. In a reply he stated that "we will never recognize war as an instrument capable of resolving conflicts between nations" and sent a letter to Fidel Castro with the same concerns as the US government, but standing against the invasion. With this position, Kennedy began to develop a personal hostility against Goulart and began to believe that the Brazilian president was a threat to the security of the United States. (Note: For the letters between President Kennedy and Goulart, read Wanielle Brito Marcelino, ed. (2010). Discursos Selecionados do Presidente João Goulart (PDF) (in Portuguese). Brasília: FUNAG. pp. 91–98. ISBN 978-85-7631-193-5.)

== The 1964 military coup ==
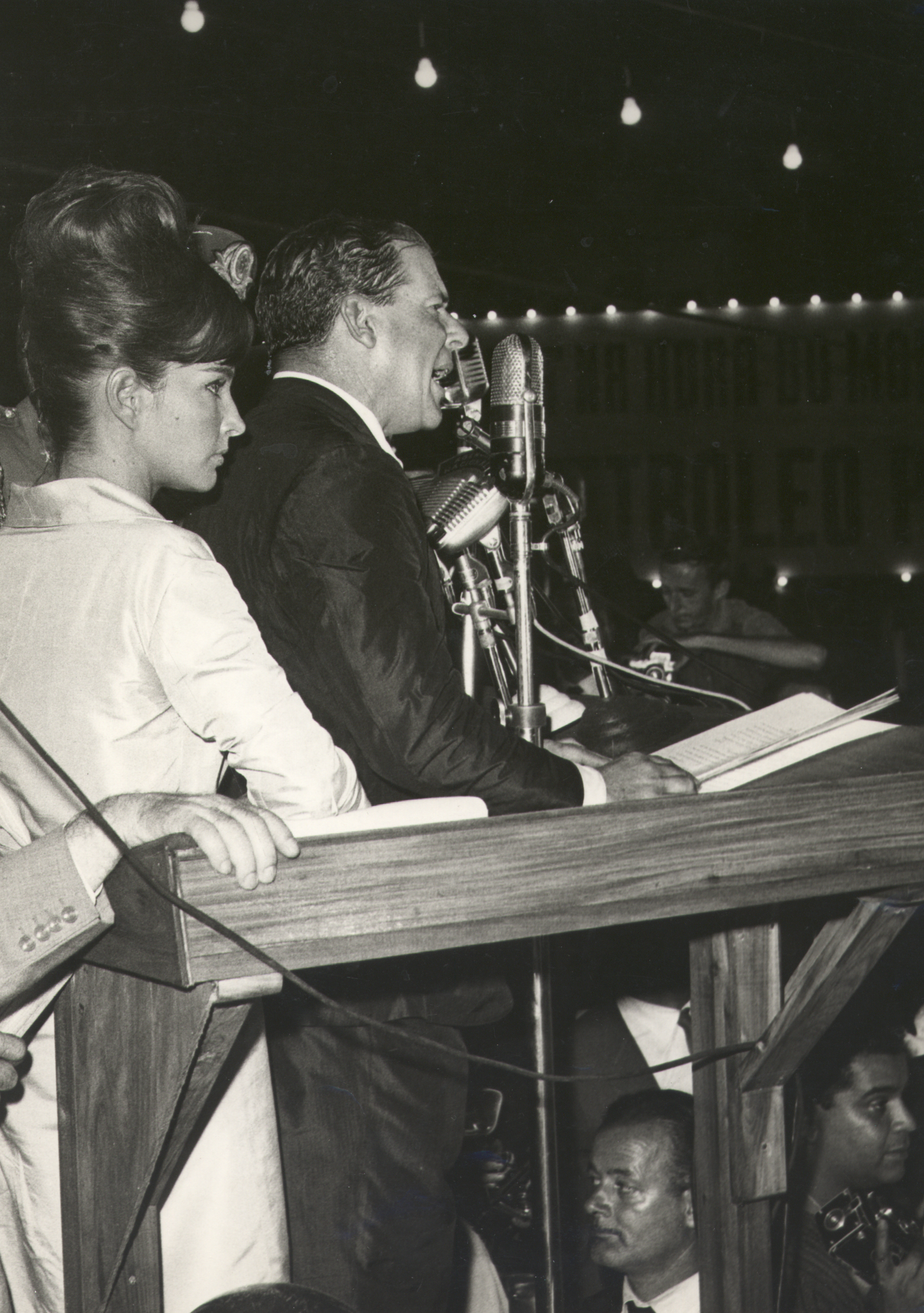
Goulart and his wife Maria Teresa during the 13 March 1964 speech

In the early hours of 31 March 1964, General Olímpio Mourão Filho, in charge of the 4th Military Region, headquartered in Juiz de Fora, Minas Gerais, ordered his troops to start moving toward Rio de Janeiro to depose Goulart.

On 1 April, at 12:45 p.m., João Goulart left Rio for the capital, Brasília, in an attempt to stop the coup politically. When he reached Brasília, Goulart realized that he lacked any political support. The Senate president, Auro de Moura Andrade, was already calling for congressional support of the coup. Goulart stayed for a short time in Brasília, gathering his wife and two children, and flying to Porto Alegre in an Air Force Avro 748 aircraft. Soon after Goulart's plane took off, Auro de Moura Andrade declared the position of President of Brazil "vacant".

In the first hours of 2 April, Auro de Moura Andrade, along with the president of the Supreme Federal Court, swore in Pascoal Ranieri Mazzilli, the speaker of the house, as president. This move was arguably unconstitutional at the time, as João Goulart was still in the country.

At the same time, Goulart, now in the headquarters of the 3rd Army in Porto Alegre, still loyal to him at the time, contemplated resistance and counter-moves with Leonel Brizola, who argued for armed resistance. In the morning, General Floriano Machado informed the president that troops loyal to the coup were moving from Curitiba to Porto Alegre and that he had to leave the country, otherwise risking arrest. At 11:45 am, Goulart boarded a Douglas C-47 transport for his farm bordering Uruguay. Goulart would stay on his farmland until 4 April, when he finally boarded the plane for the last time, heading for Montevideo.

The coup installed successive right-wing hardliners as heads of state who suspended civil rights and liberties of the Brazilian people. They abolished all political parties and replaced them with only two, the military government's party called the National Renewal Alliance Party (Aliança Renovadora Nacional – ARENA) and the consented opposition Brazilian Democratic Movement (Movimento Democrático Brasileiro – MDB). The MDB, however, had no real power, and the military rule was marked by widespread disappearance, torture, and exile of many politicians, university students, writers, singers, painters, filmmakers, and other artists.

President João Goulart was not favorably viewed in Washington. He took an independent stance in foreign policy, resuming relations with socialist countries and opposing sanctions against Cuba; his administration passed a law limiting the amount of profits multinationals could transmit outside the country; a subsidiary of ITT was nationalized; he promoted economic and social reforms.

Lincoln Gordon served as U.S. Ambassador to Brazil (1961–1966), where he played a major role for the support of the opposition against the government of President João Goulart and during the 1964 Brazilian coup d'état. On 27 March 1964, he wrote a top secret cable to the US government, urging it to support the coup of Humberto de Alencar Castello Branco with a "clandestine delivery of arms" and shipments of gas and oil, to possibly be supplemented by CIA covert operations. Gordon believed that Goulart, wanting to "seize dictatorial power", was working with the Brazilian Communist Party. Gordon wrote: "If our influence is to be brought to bear to help avert a major disaster here--which might make Brazil the China of the 1960s--this is where both I and all my senior advisors believe our support should be placed." In the years after the coup, Gordon, Gordon's staff, and the CIA repeatedly denied that they had been involved, and President Lyndon B. Johnson praised Gordon's service in Brazil as "a rare combination of experience and scholarship, idealism and practical judgment." In 1976, Gordon stated that the Johnson Administration "had been prepared to intervene militarily to prevent a leftist takeover of the government," but did not directly state that it had or had not intervened.

Circa 2004 many documents were declassified and placed online at the GWU National Security Archive, indicating the involvement of Johnson, McNamara, Gordon, and others. In 2005, Stansfield Turner's book described the involvement of ITT Corporation president Harold Geneen and CIA Director John McCone. Attorney General Robert F. Kennedy was uneasy about Goulart allowing "communists" to hold positions in government agencies. US President Lyndon Johnson and his Defense Secretary Robert S. McNamara were also worried. Kennedy, who had made plans for a coup when his brother John was president, characterized Goulart as a "wily" politician in a White House tape.

The president of ITT, Harold Geneen, was a friend of the Director of Central Intelligence, John McCone. Between 1961 and 1964, the CIA performed psyops against Goulart, performed character assassination, pumped money into opposition groups, and enlisted the help of the Agency for International Development and the AFL-CIO. It has also been acknowledged that the Kennedy Administration was the architect of a potential coup and that President Johnson inherited plans for it. US President John F. Kennedy had discussed options on how to deal with Goulart with Gordon and his chief Latin America advisor Richard N. Goodwin in July 1962 and determined in December 1962 that the coup was necessary in order to advance US interests.

== Life in exile ==
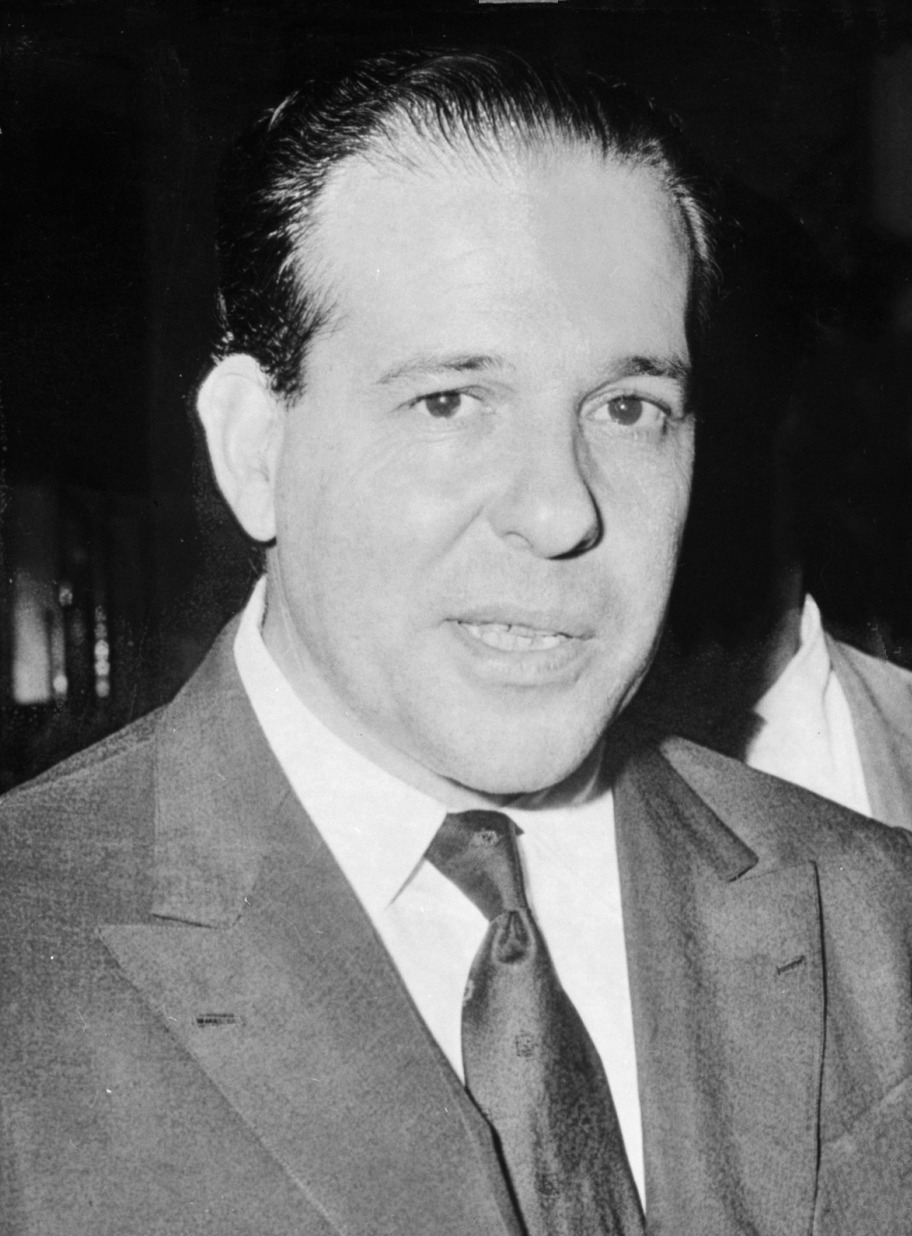
Goulart in 1964

On 4 April 1964, Goulart and his family landed in Uruguay seeking political asylum. After his first years in Montevideo, he bought a farm on the Uruguay-Brazil border, where he devoted himself to farming cattle. In 1966 he took part in the Frente Ampla (Broad Front) political movement, which aimed to fully restore democratic rule in Brazil through peaceful means. The end of Frente Ampla also resulted in the end of Goulart's political activity. He decided to focus on managing his farms located in Uruguay, Paraguay, Argentina, and Brazil.

In late 1973, Argentine president Juan Domingo Perón invited Goulart to live in Buenos Aires and asked him to collaborate on a plan to expand Argentine meat exports to Europe and other markets that would not traditionally buy the Argentine commodity. However, Perón's minister of social welfare and private secretary José López Rega opposed the designation. Nevertheless, Goulart decided to stay in Buenos Aires.

In March 1976 in the town of La Plata, the Argentine Army dismantled a group of right-wing terrorists planning to kidnap Goulart's son and demand a high ransom in cash. With his personal security compromised, the former president distanced himself from Buenos Aires. This experience led Goulart to arrange new steps for his safe return to Brazil. However, this was delayed because of upcoming elections.

== Death ==
On 6 December 1976, Goulart died in his apartment La Villa, in the Argentine municipality of Mercedes, province of Corrientes, supposedly of a heart attack. Since Goulart's body was not submitted to an autopsy, the cause of his death is unconfirmed. Around 30,000 people attended his funeral service, which was censored from press coverage by the military dictatorship.

On 26 April 2000, the former governor of Rio Grande do Sul and Rio de Janeiro, Leonel Brizola, said that former presidents Goulart and Kubitschek were assassinated as part of Operation Condor and requested investigations into their deaths.

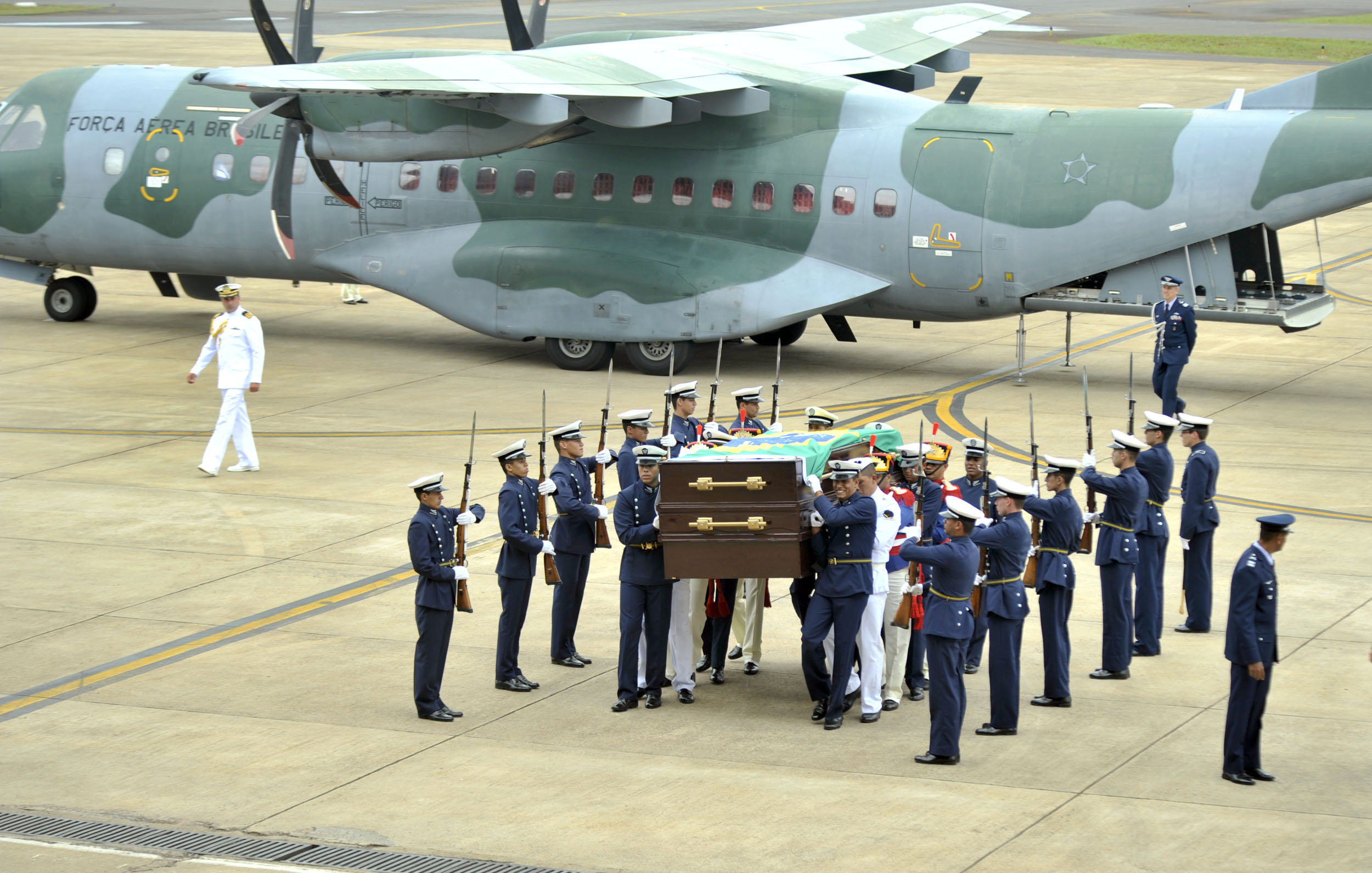
Goulart's remains arrive in Brasília almost 40 years after his death, 14 November 2013.

On 27 January 2008, the newspaper Folha de S.Paulo printed a story with a statement from Mario Neira Barreiro, a former intelligence service member under Uruguay's dictatorship. Barreiro said that Goulart was poisoned, confirming Brizola's allegations. Barreiro also said that the order to assassinate Goulart came from Sérgio Paranhos Fleury, head of the Departamento de Ordem Política e Social (Department of Political and Social Order), and the license to kill came from president Ernesto Geisel. In July 2008, a special commission of the legislative assembly of Rio Grande do Sul, Goulart's home state, concluded that "the evidence that Jango was willfully assassinated, with knowledge of the Geisel government, is strong."

In March 2009, the magazine CartaCapital published previously unreleased documents of the National Intelligence Service, created by an undercover agent who was present at Goulart's properties in Uruguay. This revelation reinforces the theory that the former president was poisoned. The Goulart family has not yet identified who could be the "B Agent" that is mentioned in the documents. The agent acted as a close friend to Goulart and described in detail an argument during the former president's 56th birthday party with his son stemming from a fight between two employees. As a result of the story, the Human Rights Commission of the Chamber of Deputies decided to investigate Goulart's death.

Later, CartaCapital published an interview with Goulart's widow, Maria Teresa Fontela Goulart, who revealed documents from the Uruguayan government that documented her complaints that her family was being monitored. The Uruguayan government was monitoring Goulart's travel and his business and political activities. These files were from 1965, a year after the coup in Brazil, and suggest that he could have been deliberately attacked. The Movement for Justice and Human Rights and the President João Goulart Institute have requested a document in which the Uruguayan interior ministry said that "serious and responsible Brazilian sources" talked about an "alleged plot against the former Brazilian president."

== Political views ==
=== Afro-Brazilians ===
Close interactions with the poor, especially poor Afro-Brazilians, was normal behavior for the young Goulart. The main leader of his Carnival block Comigo Ninguém Pode, mãe-de-santo Jorgina Vieira, said in an interview with the newspaper Zero Hora that Goulart was one of the only white boys in São Borja to be a member of the block. At a particular Carnival celebration in the 1940s, he broke high society rules and led the block inside the aristocratic Clube Comercial, which would not allow blacks in their halls until the late 1960s.

=== Communism ===
Like many other leftist politicians of the Cold War era, Goulart was accused of being a communist at various times. As a response to Carlos Lacerda, his most frequent accuser, he cited right-wing politicians also supported by the Brazilian Communist Party whom the latter [Lacerda] would not criticize. In an interview with the newspaper O Jornal, Goulart declared, "regarding the communists, they have supported indistinctly candidates of several political affiliations, conservatives or populists. I do not wish to distinguish such support, but I will only allow myself this question: is perhaps Colonel Virgílio Távora a communist, just because, ostensibly, he accepts the support of communists in Ceará? How to say that the illustrious patriot of UDN Milton Campos is communist, for accepting, as he did in Minas, the same votes requested by Mr. Afonso Arinos here in Rio?" In 1967, Lacerda acknowledged that Goulart wasn't "a man from the Communist Party".

== Tributes and amnesty ==
In 1984, exactly twenty years after the coup, filmmaker Sílvio Tendler directed a documentary chronicling Goulart's political career through archive footage and interviews with influential politicians. Jango was viewed in theaters by over half a million people, becoming the sixth-largest grossing Brazilian documentary. It was critically acclaimed, receiving three awards at the Gramado Film Festival and one at the Havana Film Festival, as well as the Silver Daisy, given by the National Conference of Brazilian Bishops (Conferência Nacional dos Bispos do Brasil).

There are at least ten schools throughout Brazil named after Goulart. Most are located on Rio Grande do Sul, in the municipalities of Alvorada, Ijuí, Novo Hamburgo, Porto Alegre, Viamão, and in Goulart's native São Borja. There are three schools named after Goulart in Rio de Janeiro, Balneário Camboriú and Santa Catarina, and another in São João de Meriti in Rio de Janeiro. On 6 December 2007, exactly 31 years after Goulart's death, a monument was erected in Balneário Camboriú depicting Goulart sitting on a bench on the Avenida Atlântica (in front of the Atlantic Ocean) with his two children. It was designed by artist Jorge Schroder upon the request of mayor Rubens Spernau.

On 28 June 2008, the Avenida Presidente João Goulart (President João Goulart Avenue) in Osasco was inaugurated in São Paulo. The boulevard is about 760 meters long and is the first of the city with a bicycle path. Other cities, such as Canoas, Caxias do Sul, Cuiabá, Lages, Pelotas, Porto Alegre, Porto Velho, Ribeirão Preto, Rio de Janeiro, Rondonópolis, São Borja, São Leopoldo, São Paulo, and Sobral already have roads honoring Goulart.

On 15 November 2008, Goulart and his widow Maria Thereza received political amnesty from the federal government at the 20th National Congress of Lawyers in Natal, Rio Grande do Norte. The former First Lady received restitution of R$ 644,000 (around US$322,000) to be paid in pensions of R$5,425 (around US$2,712) per month for Goulart having been prohibited from practicing as a lawyer. She also received restitution of R$100,000 (around US$50,000) for the 15 years when her family was forbidden to return to Brazil.

It will never be enough emphasize the heroic role of Jango to the Brazilian people, given that he represents as few do the ideal of a fairer, more egalitarian, and more democratic Brazil. (...) The government recognizes its mistakes of the past and apologizes to a man who defended the nation and its people; a man whom we could not have done without.

— Letter by Lula da Silva to the Amnesty Commission.

== Goulart family vs USA ==
During the promotion of his book on Brazilian territory in November 2002, Lincoln Gordon, former U.S. ambassador to Brazil in 1964, admitted that the CIA had bought Brazilian congressmen for five million dollars for the coup against João Goulart, in addition to the logistical and military support. This led the Goulart family to raise a lawsuit for moral, property and image damages against the United States, with the desire to eventually take the case to the World Court.

The 3rd Panel of the Superior Court of Justice, under the report of Nancy Andrighi's minister, would have to decide whether the act was an act of empire ("anyone who contains an order or a co-active decision of the administration for the administered, such as an expropriation decree, an interdiction order or a requisition of assets") or an act of management ("act of management are those that the administration practices without using its supremacy over the recipients. This occurs in acts purely of administration of public goods and services and in negotiations with private parties, which do not require coercion over the interested parties"). This action was an appeal after the federal judge of the 10th Circuit Court of Rio de Janeiro extinguished the case, under the interpretation that it was an act of empire.

The Federal Regional Court of the 2nd Region considered that the competence to handle the case lies with the STJ. Nancy Andrighi considered that the United States has committed an act of management, thus, welcoming the appeal. However, there was no consensus among the ministers of the 3rd Class.

In March 2008, Minister Sidnei Beneti of the Supreme Court of Justice postponed the analysis of the action. The trial was returned on 24 June 2008. The STJ finally dismissed the case, considering that the United States has immunity under Brazilian law and the STF finally denied the request in 2010, recognizing that the United States has immunity against Brazilian law.

== Electoral performance ==
Year	Election	Position	Party	Votes	Result
1947	Rio Grande do Sul State Elections	State deputy	PTB	4.150	Elected
1950	Rio Grande do Sul State Elections	Federal deputy	PTB	39.832	Elected
1954	Rio Grande do Sul State Elections	Senator	PTB	346.198	Lost
1955	Brazilian presidential election	Vice-President	PTB	3.591.409	Elected
1960	Brazilian presidential election	Vice-President	PTB	4.547.010	Elected

== See also ==
- History of Brazil (1964–1985)
- Goulart family lawsuit against the USA
- João Goulart's House

== Sources ==
- Braga, Kenny; Souza, João Borges de; Dioni, Cleber; Bones, Elmar (2004). João Goulart (1919–1976) – Perfil, discursos e depoimentos (PDF). Perfis Parlamentares Gaúchos (in Portuguese). Porto Alegre: Assembléia Legislativa do Estado do Rio Grande do Sul. Archived from the original (PDF) on 29 May 2008.
- Jorge Ferreira (2011). João Goulart (in Portuguese) (3 ed.). Civilização Brasileira. p. 714. ISBN 978-85-200-1056-3.

Political offices
Preceded by Oscar Carneiro da Fontoura	Secretary of the Interior and Justice of Rio Grande do Sul; 1951–1952	Succeeded by Egídio Michaelsen
Preceded by José de Segadas Viana	Minister of Labour, Industry and Trade; 1953–1954	Succeeded by Hugo de Araújo Faria
Preceded by Café Filho	Vice President of Brazil; 1956–1961	Succeeded by José Maria Alkmin
Preceded by Ranieri Mazzilli (interim)	President of Brazil; 1961–1964	Succeeded by Ranieri Mazzilli (interim)
Party political offices
Preceded by Dinarte Dornelles	National President of the Brazilian Labour Party; 1952–1965	Succeeded by Lutero Vargas
New political party	PTB nominee for Vice President of Brazil; 1955, 1960	Succeeded by Paiva Muniz (1989)
