= Riocentro bombing =

1981 attempted terrorist attack

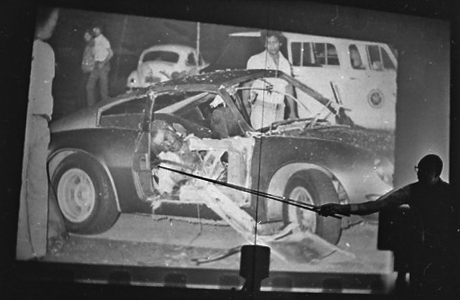
- The Brazilian Army presents the results of their inquiry, showing the vehicle in which one of the bombs detonated early, containing the corpse of Sergeant Guilherme do Rosário
- Location: 22°58′41.1″S 43°24′40.77″W; Riocentro, Rio de Janeiro, Brazil
- Date: 30 April 1981; 21:20 (BRT)
- Target: Dictatorship opponents
- Attack type: Bombings
- Weapon: Explosives
- Deaths: 1
- Injuries: 1
- Perpetrators: Sgt. Guilherme Pereira do Rosário; Cpt. Wilson Luiz Chaves Machado
- Motive: Stop the redemocratization in Brazil; Value the repression apparatus of the military dictatorship in Brazil
- Charges: Colonel Wilson Machado charged with qualified manslaughter and General Newton Cruz charged with perjury
- Verdict: Both Machado and Cruz found not guilty on any charges

The Riocentro bombing (Portuguese: atentado do Riocentro) was an attempted terrorist attack that took place on the evening of 30 April 1981, during a May Day celebration concert at the Riocentro convention center in Rio de Janeiro, Brazil. The bombing, carried out by officers of the Brazilian Army, was a false flag operation intended to frame left-wing guerrillas as violent and thereby halting the country's transition towards democracy. It ended up having the opposite effect, accelerating the end of Brazil's military regime, in power since 1964.

One of the perpetrators of the attack died, while the other was injured, from an accidental detonation of one of the bombs. A criminal inquiry from the time was inconclusive. There have been renewed investigations since 1999, one of which, conducted by the National Truth Commission, concluded that military authorities were responsible for the planning and execution of the bombing.

== Background ==
In April 1964 a coup d'état overthrew elected president João Goulart and installed a military government that went on govern the country until 1985. The first president in this regime, General Humberto Castelo Branco, who represented a moderate wing of the Brazilian military, was sidelined in 1967 by hardline president Artur da Costa e Silva, his successor. In 1968 president Costa e Silva and his ministers passed the Institutional Act Number Five (AI-5), an executive order that, among other things, suspended the right to habeas corpus and allowed the military to shut down opponents of the regime through force and suspension of political rights. Under the regime an extensive national security network was established, composed of the National Intelligence Service (SNI) and the Center for Internal Defense Operations (DOI-CODI); the SNI was instrumental for the government to pursue a repression of opposition. The state DOI-CODI centers and the Center of Information of the Navy (CENIMAR) detained and tortured several regime dissidents as part of the Doctrine of National Security, a policy institutionalized by the army.

The late 1970s and much of the 80s saw the rise of redemocratization movements throughout Latin America that sought to end the prevailing military regimes in the region. The democratic cause in Brazil and all of Latin America was in part aided by U.S. president Jimmy Carter's promotion of human rights in his foreign policy. In 1974 the newly-inaugurated Ernesto Geisel administration moved away from the authoritarian repression of president Emílio Garrastazu Médici's government, and towards a restoration of Brazil's rule of law. Additionally, that year the Brazilian Democratic Movement (MDB), the only legally allowed opposition party, had significant electoral victories. The global economic pressure also led to an internal crisis within the government. The interventionism and developmentalism that characterized the regime led to clashes during the Geisel administration (1974 – 79) between the nationalized industry sectors and the private multinationals, and divided the military into liberal and statist wings.

These events pressured the military government to slowly begin a strategy to transition Brazil back to a democratic system, a process that is known in Brazilian politics as the abertura (opening). In 1978 the government rescinded the AI-5 effective 1 January 1979, which opened the door for popular movements to protest the government without fear of retaliation. Part of the abertura plan included the Party Reform Bill of 1979, which abolished the ruling pro-military party ARENA and the MDB and allowed the registration of new political parties. The bill was passed under protests by MDB members of congress, since it divided the anti-ARENA block into several parties and thus diluted the opposition. ARENA reorganized into the Social Democratic Party (PDS), while MDB chose to retain their identity by simply adding "party" to its name, thus forming the PMDB.

=== Earlier attacks ===
Despite the gradual process to redemocratize Brazil, several groups within the military mounted a resistance to the abertura, mainly those involved in suppressing dissidents through force and espionage. After Geisel was succeeded by João Figueiredo, the last ruler of Brazil's military dictatorship, in 1979, the military made efforts to preserve their power by covering up the violence and tortures committed by the regime from its inception in 1964.

Clandestine acts of terror committed by army members and those linked to the military spiked in the late 1970s, 1980 and the early months of 1981. In 1976 the right-wing Brazilian Anti-Communist Alliance claimed responsibility for ten bombings that happened that year. In 1976 Bishop Adriano Hipólito of Nova Iguaçú, Rio de Janeiro was kidnapped by local members of the military and was targeted in a bombing in 1979. In 1978 and 1979 several terrorist attacks were carried out against members of the opposition in the state of Minas Gerais. According to historian Maria Helena Moreira Alves, the year of 1980 saw 46 acts of right-wing terrorism. Notably, in September 1980, a letter bomb was sent to the Brazilian Bar Association headquarters, killing the secretary Lyda Monteiro da Silva. On the same day the offices of Rio de Janeiro city councillor Antônio Carlos de Carvalho were destroyed.

== Timeline ==
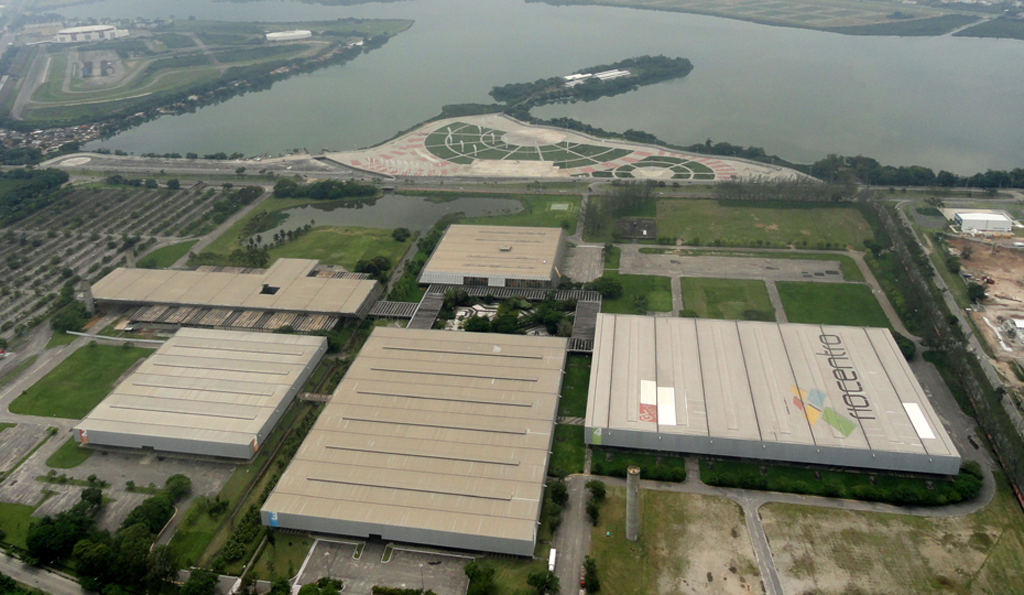
The Riocentro convention center, in Rio de Janeiro

Throughout the evening of 30 April 1981, the Riocentro convention center in Rio de Janeiro's West Zone hosted a pop music concert organized by Centro Brasil Democrático to celebrate Workers' Day. Over 20,000 people were in attendance, and the event was headlined by many famous MPB artists such as Moraes Moreira, Alceu Valença, Gal Costa, MPB-4, Beth Carvalho, Gonzaguinha, Elba Ramalho and Chico Buarque.

On the afternoon of 30 April, Army Colonel and commander of the Rio police force Newton Cerqueira made a phone call to Lt. Col. Fernando Antônio Pott telling him to suspend policing of the Riocentro event for the evening and to keep 60 officers at the precinct alert for any emergency. At Riocentro, operations manager Maria Ângela Lopes Campobianco reassigned Lt. César Wachulec from head of security to the tickets office, claiming he had issues with alcoholism. Outside of Riocentro billboard were graffitied with the acronym VPR (Vanguarda Popular Revolucionária, a left-wing guerrilla group that had not existed since 1973). At around 9 pm, two cars were driven into the Riocentro parking lot, one of them a Puma GTE.

In the Puma were two DOI-CODI officers, who planned to detonated a bomb under the stage of the concert. At around 9:15 a bomb went off prematurely in the car, killing Army Sergeant Guilherme Pereira do Rosário, and seriously injuring Captain Wilson Luiz Chaves Machado. Machado was taken to Hospital Miguel Couto, where he requested that Captain Francisco de Paula Sousa Pinto be informed of the accident. Machado underwent surgery all night; according to an early medical report his condition was serious but not life-threatening.

At 9:45, another bomb detonated at a nearby power station; the bomb was intended to cut off the electricity provided to Riocentro. Minutes later a Chevrolet Opala left the parking lot, with one of the passengers exclaiming to a security guard, "you haven't seen anything yet. The worst is going to happen in there". The bomb failed to cause a blackout.

Police surrounded the area where the bomb exploded. Agents from the General Department of Special Investigations (DGIE) and the Political and Social Police (DPPS), as well as officers from the 16th and 32nd precincts, inspected the location. Forensic expects of the DGIE and DPPS concluded that the explosion was "very violent" and that the damage could have been worse had the car not been distant from other vehicles in the parking lot. Even still, a nearby Chevette had its windshield destroyed. The experts claimed that the bomb at the power station was conducted by a different group that had not been yet identified. Breaking news reports on the explosions on radio and television prompted relatives of concert attendees to drive to Riocentro in search of more information, leading to increased traffic and causing a commotion in the surroundings.

=== Reactions and government response ===
At the concert, Gonzaguinha communicated the happenings of that evening to the audience. In a speech he said "these two bombs represent exactly a fight to destroy that which we all want, a democracy, freedom". He further urged the audience to "remember this very well" because next's year May Day celebration "depend[ed] on [them]". Approached after the show ended, Chico Buarque said that if true, the bombing was "nameless cowardice" and a "terrorist attack against the First of May show, against the First of May, [...] and against the Brazilian people, I think, regardless of the music being played".

On 2 May the Commander of the First Army Division, General Gentil Marcondes Filho, declared that the men were in an "information mission, in service of the First Army [Division]". When asked if Machado was the victim or author of the explosions, Marcondes Filho answered that he was "obviously" a victim, "unless proven otherwise". Marcondes Filho had attended the funeral of Rosário, who was buried with military honors, at the Cemetery of Irajá, and later arrived at Hospital Miguel Couto to visit Captain Machado. In an interview at the hospital he said "whatever is investigated will be [publicly] disclosed". That day, colleagues of Machado and the widow of Rosário revealed to the press that both men worked for the DOI-CODI.

Political reactions to the events were swift. On 2 May Minister of Justice Ibrahim Abi-Ackel said the bomb "exploded inside the government" in a statement repudiating the explosions. Abi-Ackel guaranteed, however, that the incident would not affect the abertura process. In a statement, Minas Gerais Senator Tancredo Neves described the incident as the "last rattle of the reaction defeated in the polls and sweeped from [its] ranks". PMDB secretary-general and Rio Grande do Sul Senator Pedro Simon expressed his fears that the terrorist violence would go unpunished and bemoaned the "incompetence of the government" in investigating it. Congressional leaders denounced the act as terrorism and expressed concern that hardliners wanted to sabotage the abertura. A Planalto source spoke of the news of the explosion as a surprise to the administration.

On 1 May the First Army Division launched a military police inquiry (IPM) to investigate the incidents at Riocentro. On 3 May the Federal Police also opened an investigation, according to the press secretary of the Ministry of Justice.

According to O Globo in 2018, a May 1981 U.S. intelligence document previously located in the State Dept. showed early evidence of the attack being coordinated by the military and not left-wing organizations. The document does not ascribe the attack to President Figueiredo, who did not "necessarily need to be involved in any way with the actions of the Army in these incidents". The document, kept in the National Archives in Rio, also describes the Figueiredo administration's actions to prevent a crisis by promising to publish results of the investigation and maintain the regular agenda to try and keep stories about Riocentro away from the news media.

== Legal action ==
In 1999, fourteen years after the redemocratization of Brazil, an inquiry on the attack was opened by federal prosecutor Gilda Berer. It concluded that Rosário and Machado were responsible for the crime, in addition to former National Intelligence directors Newton Cruz and Freddie Perdigão. The Superior Military Court moved to shelve the case under Brazilian amnesty law.

In April 2014 the National Truth Commission (CNV), established by the federal government in 2011 to investigate human rights violations from 1946 to 1988, released their report on the Riocentro case. CNV concluded that military authorities were not only aware of the attack beforehand, but were also behind decisions to reduce policing that night, lock emergency exits at Riocentro and cover up the subsequent controversy. The report further stated that the attack aimed at "obstruct[ing] the political abertura process" and was planned to be the "largest terrorist attack in the history of Brazil", but its failed execution reframed it as an "episode that reveals the violence of the dictatorial State against Brazilian society".

In 2014 five military men and a police chief were charged with first-degree murder and criminal conspiracy for their involvement in the operation, after renewed investigations by Federal Public Prosecution. In September 2019 the Superior Court of Justice of Brazil ruled in favor of archiving the criminal suit against the six men, citing that it was not possible to characterize the attack as a crime against humanity and that the suit was in violation of Article 5 of the Constitution, which prohibits ex post facto enforcement of the law.

== See also ==
- Military dictatorship in Brazil
- Missão 115, a 2018 documentary on the attack
- Domestic terrorism
