= 1978 Brazilian presidential election =

- 15 October 1978

591 members of the electoral college 296 electoral votes needed to win
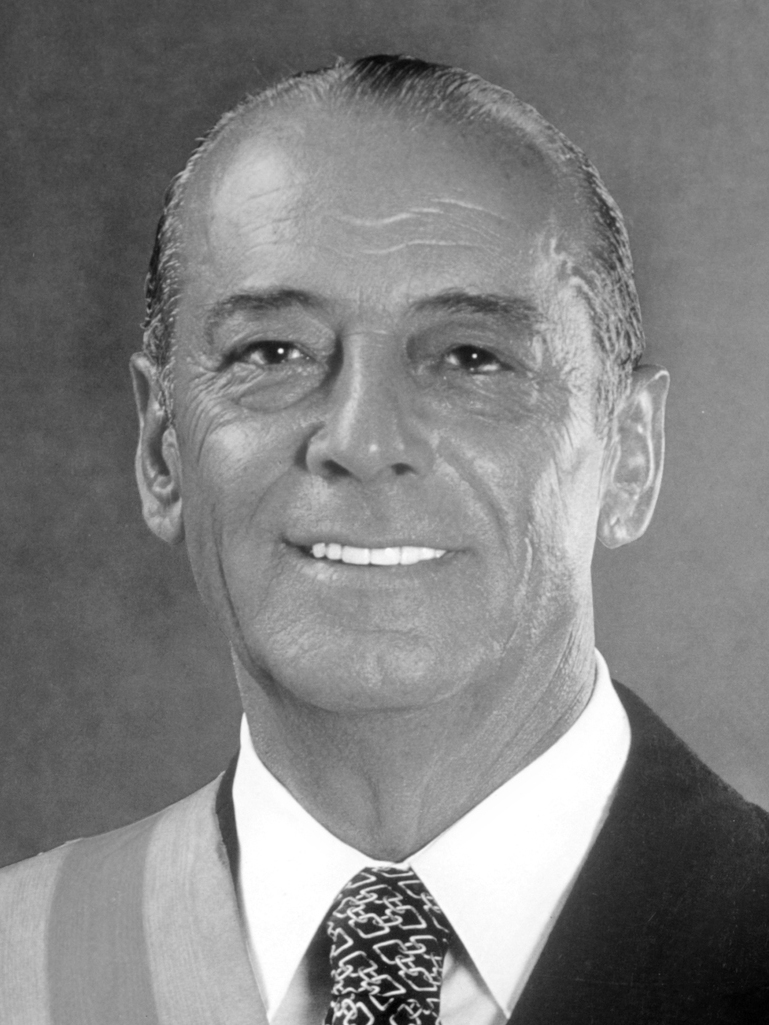

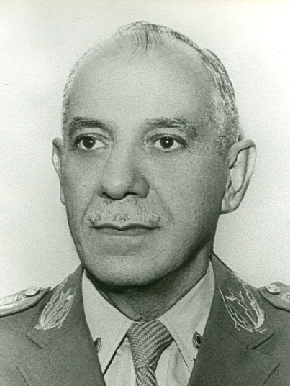
Nominee	João Figueiredo	Euler Bentes Monteiro
Party	ARENA	MDB
Running mate	Aureliano Chaves	Paulo Brossard
Electoral vote	355	226
Percentage	61.1%	38.9%
President before election
Ernesto Geisel
ARENA
Elected President
João Figueiredo
ARENA

Indirect presidential elections were held in Brazil on 15 October 1978. The opposition Brazilian Democratic Movement (MDB) chose an anti-candidate to fill the spot and denounce the restrictive democracy. The MDB chose General Euler Bentes Monteiro to run against João Figueiredo from the National Renewal Alliance Party (ARENA). Figueiredo won with 355 electoral votes against 226 votes for Euler Monteiro.

== Results ==
Candidate	Running mate	Party	Votes	%
João Figueiredo	Aureliano Chaves	National Renewal Alliance	355	61.10
Euler Bentes Monteiro	Paulo Brossard	Brazilian Democratic Movement	226	38.90
Total			581	100.00
Total votes			581	–
Registered voters/turnout			591	98.31
Source: Folha de S.Paulo
