= Newton Cruz =

Brazilian Army general (1924–2022)

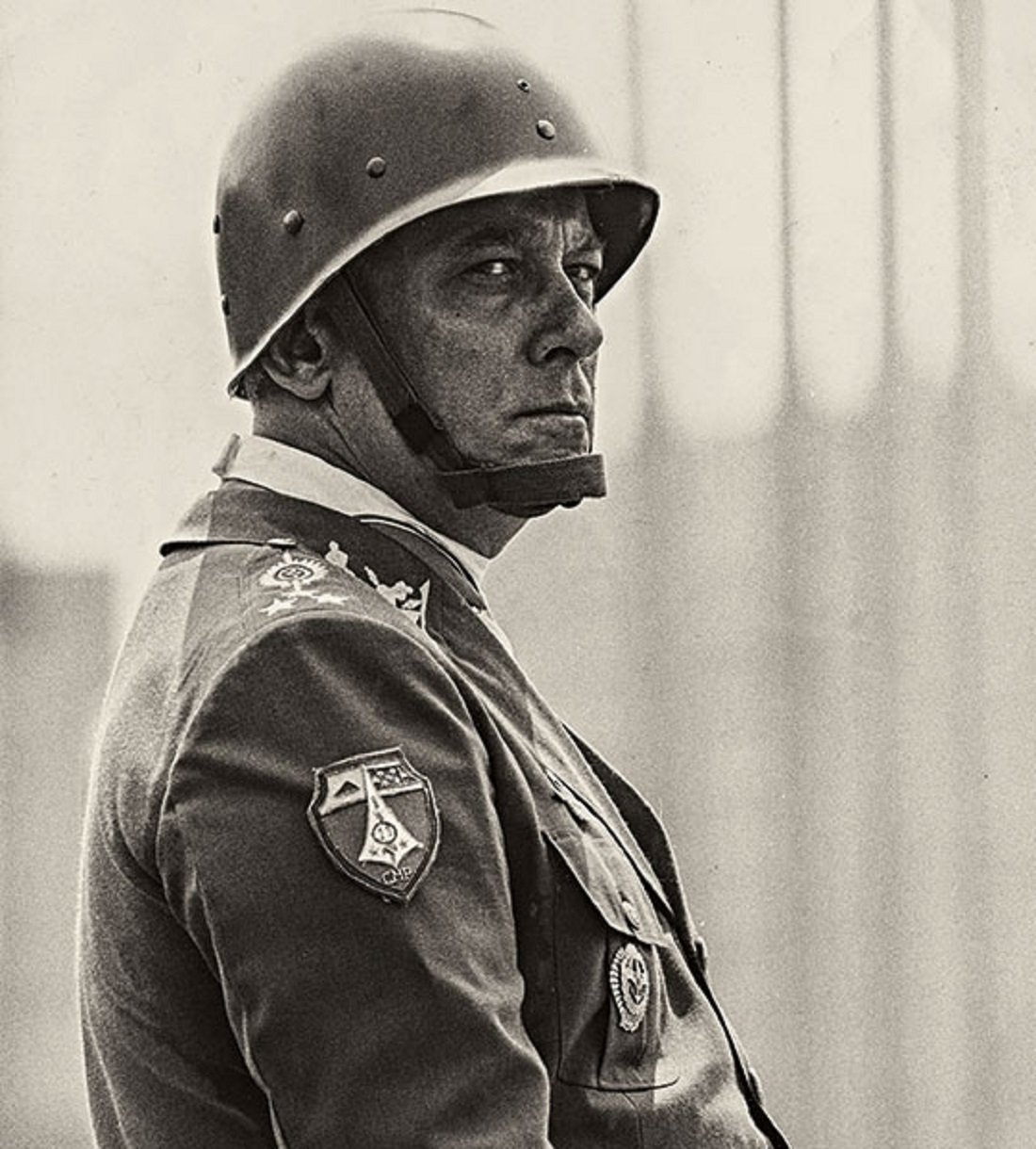
- Born: Newton Araújo de Oliveira e Cruz; 30 October 1924; Rio de Janeiro, Federal District, Brazil
- Died: 15 April 2022 (aged 97); Rio de Janeiro, Rio de Janeiro, Brazil
- Military career
- Allegiance: Brazil
- Branch: Brazilian Army
- Rank: Divisional general
- Commands: Fort Tamandaré da Laje; 3rd Section of the Eastern Military Command; 1st Howitzer Regiment 105; Divisional Artillery of the 4th Army Division; Central Agency of the National Information Service; Planalto Military Command

Newton Araújo de Oliveira e Cruz (30 October 1924 – 15 April 2022) was a division general in the Brazilian Army, noted for his participation in the repressive activities of the military dictatorship in Brazil between 1964 and 1985.

== Formation ==
After graduating from the Military School of Realengo in Artillery, Newton Cruz was also a classmate of General Otávio Aguiar de Medeiros, and later his partner in political-military life. On 31 March 1964, he attended the School of Command and General Staff (ECEME) in Urca, Rio de Janeiro, when the Military Dictatorship began.

== Posts occupied ==
Newton Cruz was head of the Central Agency of the National Information Service, from 1977 to 1983, and of the Planalto Military Command.

On a number of occasions, he was accused of crimes committed throughout his army career. Notably, he was charged with the death of journalist Alexandre von Baumgarten, based on the testimony of dancer Claudio Werner Polila. The general denied being involved and claimed to have been informed of the identity of the person responsible for the murder, but the disclosure was denied.

For a long time, Newton Cruz was related to the Riocentro bomb attack, which occurred on 30 April 1981. About this attack, Newton Cruz stated that the group of soldiers represented acted independently with the objective of dropping the bomb in the surroundings of the event, and that the attack was not intended to kill anyone, would have been just an "act of presence". In an interview with the cable television channel Globo News, the general said that he prevented another attack, planned in the wake of the Riocentro Attack, extrapolating the functions of his position. In May 2014, Newton Cruz was indicted, along with four Army Reserve officers and two other defendants, for crimes by bombing Riocentro in 1981. However, in July 2014 habeas corpus issued by the Regional Court Federal of the 2nd Region, for having considered that the crime was already prescribed.

Newton Cruz said in an interview that in 1985 the then indirect candidate for the presidency of Brazil, Paulo Maluf, went to his house for a conversation. He began by saying that the right thing was to prevent the inauguration of Tancredo Neves and indifferent to the death of his political opponent, imagining that he was a murderer. Maluf denied it, and sued Newton Cruz.

== Cruz' aggression against a journalist ==
At a press conference in 1983, General Cruz told journalist Honório Dantas to shut up, grabbed him by the neck and dragged him by the arm.

== Political career ==
In 1994, he ran for governor of Rio de Janeiro for the Social Democratic Party (PSD), finishing third, with 14% of the votes, behind Marcello Alencar (PSDB, 37%) and Anthony Garotinho (PDT, 30%).

== Death ==
Cruz died in Rio de Janeiro on 15 April 2022, at the age of 97.
