= Fernando Lyra =

Brazilian politician (1938–2013)

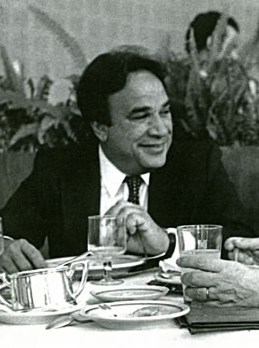

Minister of Justice
- In office 15 March 1985 – 14 February 1986
- President: José Sarney
- Preceded by: Ibrahim Abi-Ackel
- Succeeded by: Paulo Brossard

Personal details
- Born: 8 October 1938 Recife, Brazil
- Died: 14 February 2013 (aged 74) São Paulo, Brazil

Fernando Lyra (8 October 1938 – 14 February 2013) was a Brazilian politician who served as Minister of Justice from 1985 to 1986. Born in Recife in 1938, Lyra died of multiple organ failure in São Paulo on 14 February 2013, at the age of 73
