= Euler Bentes Monteiro =

Brazilian politician and military officer

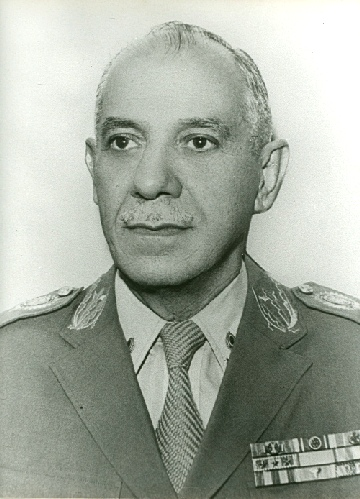
- Born: 15 January 1917; Rio de Janeiro, Federal District, Brazil
- Died: 23 July 2002 (aged 85) Rio de Janeiro, Rio de Janeiro, Brazil
- Allegiance: Brazil
- Branch: Brazilian Army
- Rank: General
- Education: Military School of Realengo

Euler Bentes Monteiro (15 January 1917 – 23 July 2002) was a Brazilian military officer.

== Career ==
In 1933 he entered the Military School of Realengo. Already a captain, in 1945 he supported the conspiracy against Getúlio Vargas.

In 1950 he defended the state oil monopoly in the elections to the Military Club, joining the nationalist list. He graduated from the Escola Superior de Guerra, class of 1961. In 1964, he refused to participate in the coup d'état that deposed João Goulart. Even so, he became a brigadier general in 1965, and two years later he was appointed by General Albuquerque Lima superintendent of the Sudene, position he held from 31 March 1967 to 27 January 1969.

Between 30 November 1966 and 26 March 1967, he was in command of the Escola de Aperfeiçoamento de Oficiais (EsAO, Officers' Training School) of Río de Janeiro.

With the inauguration of Ernesto Geisel in 1974, he was promoted to General of the Army. While he was head of the Artillery Department, he created the state company IMBEL.

A front of opposition to the military dictatorship, articulated by Severo Gomes, led him to run for president of Brazil, for the Brazilian Democratic Movement (MDB) in the indirect election of 1978, with Senator Paulo Brossard as vice president. He was defeated by General João Figueiredo, by 355 votes against 226.

During the Figueiredo government he was reprimanded by the Brazilian Army for having signed the manifesto Em defesa da Nação ameaçada ("In defense of the threatened Nation"), which called for effective actions to recover the national identity and regain control of the country's destiny. Other personalities that signed the document, in addition to Bentes Monteiro, include Ariano Suassuna, Barbosa Lima Sobrinho and Fernando Henrique Cardoso.
