= Saraminda =

Historical romance novel

- Author: José Sarney
- Language: Brazilian Portuguese
- Genre: Historical romance
- Publisher: Siciliano
- Publication date: 2000
- Publication place: Brazil
- Pages: 256
- ISBN: 978-8526708594

Saraminda is a 2000 historical romance novel written by 31st president of Brazil José Sarney. It takes place during the late 19th century at the Amapá-French Guiana border, which was being disputed between French and Brazilian authorities. It tells the fictional story of Saraminda, a 15-year-old black girl who falls in love with French courier Jacques Kemper, causing her husband-owner Cleto Bonfim to grow jealous of her.

The book was published internationally to positive reception. French ethnologist Claude Lévi-Strauss described the book as a "picturesque" reconstruction of a forgotten episode of French-Brazilian relations. Carlos Heitor Cony described it as a "counterpart" to José de Alencar's Iracema.

== Plot ==
The novel is told from the perspective of the ghost of Brazilian mine owner Cleto Bonfim. Bonfim had been used to taking sex workers to his mine and sending them away shortly afterwards, he had impregnated eight of them. After he arrived in a brothel where women were being sold, Saraminda, a 15-year-old prostitute, declares herself to be his, and he takes her to his home.

In a passage narrated by Saraminda, she says that she did not love Bonfim and had only offered herself to him because of his wealth. She says that she had expected him to let her go back to her home in Caiena after a brief relationship. After realizing that he had fallen in love with her and did not intend to let her go, she subtly attempts to undo their bond by asking for expensive gifts, but he complies with each of her requests. She then starts flirting with some of his employees, also to no result.

When French courier Jacques Kemper arrives at their home in order to give Saraminda a special gift on behalf of his company, which had bought Bonfim's gold, she falls in love with him. In trying to prevent Kempter from leaving, she falsely tells Bonfim that Kemper is a spy and asks him to imprison the French traveler. Bonfim then locks Kemper in a cell, which Saraminda has access to. Kemper eventually falls in love with Saraminda, to the point that he no longer wants to return to France. Bonfim eventually starts to suspect that Saraminda was having an affair with Kemper, and he asks a fortune teller about the situation. The fortune teller answers that Bonfim had welcomed a "female devil" into his house and that a "golden blade" would "save" him.

After arriving at his home, Bonfim comes upon a sleeping Saraminda in her bed. He raises his golden blade and the story ends. The book leaves it ambiguous whether he killed Saraminda, himself or both, but it narrates that after that moment the clouds grew black and it rained for three days straight.
