= Gaucho (currency) =

Proposed common currency between Argentina and Brazil

The gaucho was a proposed currency intended to be used by Argentina and Brazil in the context of the Argentina-Brazil Integration and Economics Cooperation Program or PICE (Spanish: Programa de Integración y Cooperación Económica Argentina-Brasil) to make interregional payments. It was named after the gauchos typical of both Argentina and Southern Brazil.

After the signing of Protocol Number 20, in 1987, no further action was ever taken by any of the countries to effectively put the currency into use. Mercosur, an economic bloc including Brazil and Argentina, establishing broader economic integration, was created in 1991, without any initial plans to establish a common currency. Later, in 1994, Brazil established the Brazilian real, still in use, putting an end to the frequent currency changes that took place in the country throughout the 1980s and the 1990s. On such a panorama, the Gaucho plan has been virtually shelved.

== Declaration ==
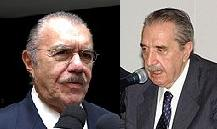
Former Brazilian President José Sarney (1985-1990) and former Argentine President Raúl Alfonsín (1983-1989). Pioneers of the Brazilian-Argentine integration.

On 17 July 1987, in the city of Viedma (Río Negro, Argentina), President Raúl Alfonsín of Argentina and President José Sarney of Brazil signed Protocol Number 20 which stated the following:

Considering:

The importance of ensuring the strengthening of the financial and monetary relationships between the Argentine Republic and the Republic of Brazil, and at the same time contributing to ensure the stability of commercial ties and qualitative and quantitative expansion of trade, in a dynamic and balanced way;

The influence of third-party currencies whose degree of availability escapes the decision-making capacity of both countries over the level of bilateral trade;

The Latin American objective to create a currency unit to enable regional payments;

The necessity of initiating a process to create such a common currency unit;

The convenience of making progress with the current system of reciprocal financing established in Protocol Number 6 for the achieving of the objective of an entire and durable monetary integration;

They Decide:

1. To create a common currency unit named “Gaucho”, expressing its value in terms determined by agreement by the Central Banks of both countries. The Central Banks will issue and back the new currency with a reserve fund;
2. To create such objective an Argentina-Brazil Reserve Fund administered by both Central Banks;
3. To determine that the results of the bilateral clearing performed each quarter should be paid with the common currency unit up to an issuing limit initially agreed at 200 million units;
4. To determine that each Central Bank opens accounts in its books aimed to register the movements of the Reserve Fund;
5. To determine that the Central Banks establish, before 30 October 1987, an interbank agreement for the implementation of the Argentine-Brazilian currency unit (Gaucho).

Viedma, 17 July 1987

== See also ==
- Mercosur
- Dedollarisation
