= Alexandre von Baumgarten =

Brazilian writer and journalist

Alexandre von Baumgarten (1930 - 1982) was a Brazilian writer and journalist, murdered in 1982 in mysterious circumstances. He was an agent of the National Intelligence Service of Brazil (SNI), the political police of the military dictatorship. He wrote the book Yellow Cake, supposedly fiction, about the uranium trafficking operation from Brazil to the Middle East.
