= Paulo Brossard =

Brazilian politician

His Excellency Paulo Brossard
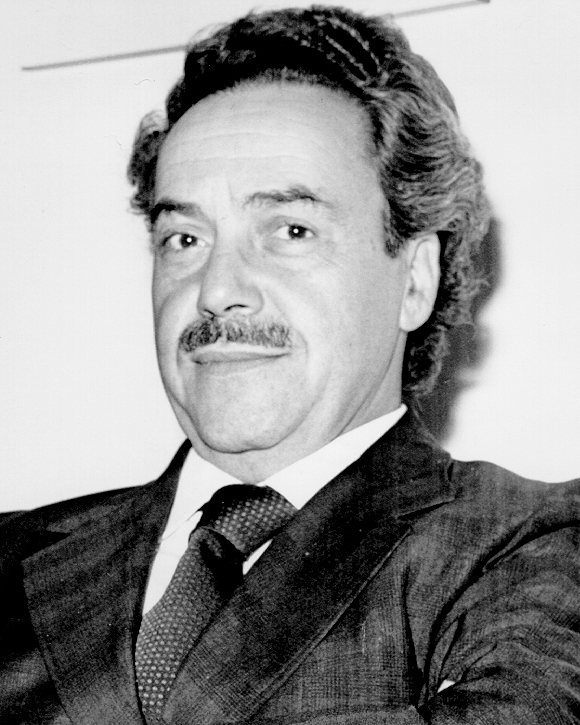
- Brossard in the 1970s

Justice of the Supreme Federal Court
- In office 5 April 1989 – 24 October 1994
- Appointed by: José Sarney
- Preceded by: Djaci Falcão
- Succeeded by: Maurício Corrêa

Minister of Justice
- In office 15 February 1986 – 18 January 1989
- President: José Sarney
- Preceded by: Fernando Lyra
- Succeeded by: Oscar Corrêa

Senator for Rio Grande do Sul
- In office 1 February 1975 – 1 February 1983

Federal Deputy for Rio Grande do Sul
- In office 1 February 1967 – 1 February 1971

State Deputy of Rio Grande do Sul
- In office 1 February 1955 – 1 February 1967

Personal details
- Born: 23 October 1924 Bagé, Rio Grande do Sul, Brazil
- Died: 12 April 2015 (aged 90) Porto Alegre, Rio Grande do Sul, Brazil
- Party: MDB; MDB; PL
- Spouse: Lúcia Alves
- Children: 3
- Parents: Francisco de Souza Pinto; Alila Brossard
- Education: Federal University of Rio Grande do Sul
- Reference(s)
- Other judicial positions: 1993–1994: Vice President, Supreme Federal Court; 1992–1993: President, Superior Electoral Court; 1991–1992: Vice President, Superior Electoral Court; 1991–1992: Effective Minister, Superior Electoral Court; 1989–1991: Substitute Minister, Superior Electoral Court

Paulo Brossard de Souza Pinto (23 October 1924 – 12 April 2015) was a Brazilian jurist and politician. Born in Bagé, Rio Grande do Sul, he graduated in Law and served several terms as a parliamentarian in his state and in the National Congress as well. He also was a member of the Supreme Federal Court and the Superior Electoral Court of Brazil.

Brossard was born in 1924 at Bagé, Rio Grande do Sul. He studied law at the Federal University of Rio Grande do Sul and specialized itself on constitutional and civil law areas, starting his career as a teacher at the Pontifical Catholic University of Rio Grande do Sul, before his début as a politician. Later, he was elected as a lawmaker for the State Assembly of Rio Grande do Sul, from there to the National Congress of Brazil, first as a representative and as a senator at last.

He ran for the Vice Presidency of Brazil in the 1978 indirect elections for the MDB ticket (General Euler Bentes as President), during the Brazilian military government. He was defeated by Aureliano Chaves, while João Figueiredo was elected as President of Brazil.

He played an important role in the crisis that arose when President elect Tancredo Neves could not be able to take office in 1985, as the first civilian citizen to bear such position after the 1964 Brazilian coup d'état. Confusion and discrepancies were spreading many different understandings on the Brazilian laws as Neves was unable to take office, at the same time his running mate for vice presidency, José Sarney, was empowered as acting president. He strongly supported Sarney's ability and rightness to exercise the presidential powers, stating "this is the reason why vice presidents exist". (In the aftermath, Tancredo Neves has died, never taking the oath, and Sarney completed his tenure).

He died on 12 April 2015 at his home in Porto Alegre, at the age of 90.

Legal offices
Preceded by Djaci Falcão	Minister of the Supreme Federal Court; 1989–1994	Succeeded by Maurício Corrêa
