= Ibrahim Abi-Ackel =

Brazilian politician

Minister of Justice
- In office 9 January 1980 – 15 March 1985
- President: João Figueiredo
- Preceded by: Golbery do Couto e Silva
- Succeeded by: Fernando Lyra

Federal Deputy
- In office 3 January 1989 – 1 February 2007
- Constituency: Minas Gerais
- In office 19 March 1975 – 9 January 1980
- Constituency: Minas Gerais

Personal details
- Born: 2 March 1926 (age 100) Manhumirim, Minas Gerais, Brazil
- Party: PP (since 1995)
- Other political affiliations: PSD (1962–1965); ARENA (1966–1979); PDS (1980–1993); PPR (1993–1995)
- Children: 2, including Paulo
- Profession: Lawyer and teacher

Ibrahim Abi-Ackel (born 2 March 1926) is a Brazilian politician. Ackel began his public life in 1955 as councilman in the city of Manhuaçu, Minas Gerais. He was Minister of Justice in the government of João Figueiredo from 1980 to 1985.

Political offices
Preceded by Golbery do Couto e Silva	Minister of Justice; 1980–1985	Succeeded by Fernando Lyra
