= Paulo Abi-Ackel =

Brazilian politician (born 1963)

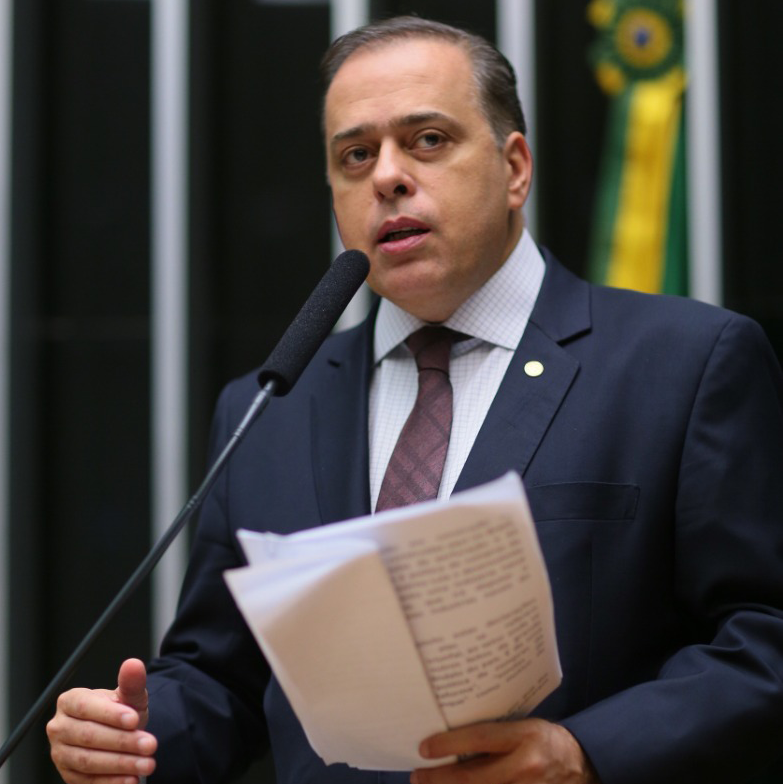

Member of the Chamber of Deputies
- Incumbent
- Assumed office 1 February 2007
- Constituency: Minas Gerais

Personal details
- Born: 21 June 1963 (age 63) Belo Horizonte, Minas Gerais, Brazil
- Party: PSDB (since 2005)
- Other political affiliations: PDS (1986–1993); PPR (1993–1995); PPB (1995–2000); PTB (2000–2005)
- Parent: Ibrahim Abi-Ackel (father)
- Profession: Lawyer

Paulo Abi-Ackel (born 21 June 1963) is a Brazilian politician and pastor. He has spent his political career representing his home state of Minas Gerais, having served as state representative since 2006.

== Personal life ==
He is the son of Ibrahim Abi-Ackel and Jacéa Cahú Abi-Ackel. His father Ibrahim is also a politician, who has served in both the state and national legislature. Before becoming a politician he worked as a lawyer.

== Political career ==
Abi-Ackel voted in favor of the impeachment of then-president Dilma Rousseff. Abi-Ackel voted in favor of the 2017 Brazilian labor reform, and would vote against a corruption investigation into Rousseff's successor Michel Temer.

Abi-Ackel was one of Temer's strongest defenders from his party, drafting a proposal defending the then-president from corruption allegations.
