= José Sarney =

President of Brazil from 1985 to 1990

- Official portrait, 1985

31st President of Brazil
- In office 15 March 1985 – 15 March 1990; Acting: 15 March 1985 – 21 April 1985
- Vice President: None
- Preceded by: João Figueiredo
- Succeeded by: Fernando Collor de Mello

20th Vice President of Brazil
- In office 15 March 1985 – 21 April 1985
- President: Tancredo Neves (died before taking office)
- Preceded by: Aureliano Chaves
- Succeeded by: Itamar Franco

President of the Federal Senate
- In office 2 February 2009 – 1 February 2013
- Preceded by: Garibaldi Alves Filho
- Succeeded by: Renan Calheiros
- In office 1 February 2003 – 14 February 2005
- Preceded by: Ramez Tebet
- Succeeded by: Renan Calheiros
- In office 2 February 1995 – 4 February 1997
- Preceded by: Humberto Lucena
- Succeeded by: Antônio Carlos Magalhães

Senator for Amapá
- In office 1 February 1991 – 1 February 2015
- Preceded by: Seat established
- Succeeded by: Davi Alcolumbre

Senator for Maranhão
- In office 1 February 1971 – 15 March 1985
- Preceded by: Vitorino de Brito Freire
- Succeeded by: Américo de Souza

Governor of Maranhão
- In office 31 January 1966 – 14 May 1970
- Vice Governor: Antônio Dino
- Preceded by: Newton Bello
- Succeeded by: Antônio Dino

Member of the Chamber of Deputies
- In office 6 June 1955 – 31 January 1966
- Constituency: Maranhão

Personal details
- Born: José Ribamar Ferreira de Araújo Costa; 24 April 1930 (age 96) Pinheiro, Maranhão, Brazil
- Party: PMDB (1985–present)
- Other political affiliations: Other parties: PFL (1985) PDS (1979–1985) ARENA (1965–1979) UDN (1955–1965)
- Spouse: Marly Macieira (m. 1952)
- Children: Roseana, Fernando, José
- Education: Federal University of Maranhão (UFMA)
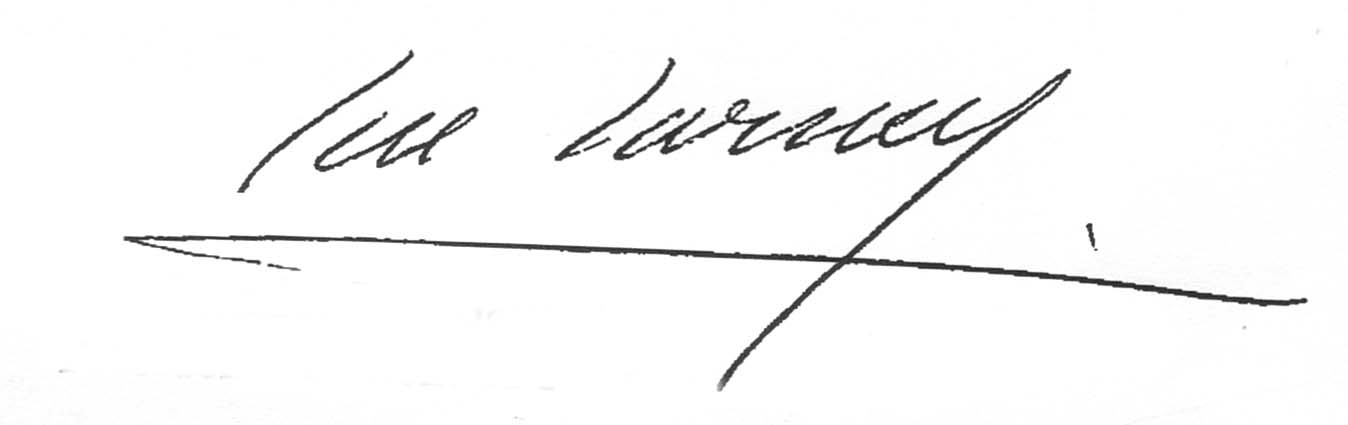
- Signature

José Sarney de Araújo Costa (Portuguese pronunciation: [ʒuˈzɛ saʁˈnej dʒi aɾaˈuʒu ˈkɔstɐ]; born José Ribamar Ferreira de Araújo Costa; 24 April 1930) is a Brazilian politician, lawyer, and writer who served as the 31st president of Brazil from 1985 to 1990. He briefly served as the 20th vice president of Brazil for a month between March and April 1985.

Sarney was a member of the Chamber of Deputies from 1955 until 1966 and of the Senate from 1971 until 1985. He was also the Governor of Maranhão from 1966 until 1970. During the Brazilian military dictatorship, Sarney affiliated himself with the government party, ARENA, becoming the president of the party in 1979. Sarney joined the dissenters, and was instrumental in the creation of the Liberal Front Party. Sarney ran for Vice-President on the ticket of Tancredo Neves of PMDB, formerly the opposition party to the military government. Neves won the presidential election, but died before taking office, and Sarney became president.

During his presidency, Sarney implemented ambitious plans to try to reverse the severe inflation inherited from João Figueiredo's government. Together with Finance Minister Dilson Funaro, he launched the Cruzado Plan and Cruzado II, which froze prices in an attempt to curb rising inflation. Even though both plans failed, Sarney made further attempts to freeze prices through the Bresser Plan and the Summer Plan, which also proved ineffective. In foreign policy, he signed the Iguaçu Declaration, which initiated the project for the creation of Mercosur. Additionally, during his administration, diplomatic relations between Brazil and Cuba — which had been suspended since the beginning of the military dictatorship — were restored. Sarney also convened the 1987 National Constituent Assembly, which drafted the 1988 Brazilian Constitution, replacing the 1967 authoritarian constitution. Overall, Sarney started out his term with great popularity, but public opinion shifted with the Brazilian debt crisis and the failure of Plano Cruzado to abate chronic inflation. His government is seen today as disastrous and clientelism was widespread having longlasting consequences for the Brazilian Republic post military dictatorship.

Following his presidency, Sarney resumed his senate career elected again in 1991 and serving until 2015. He also held the position of President of the Federal Senate three times following his presidency. At age 96, he is the oldest living former Brazilian president, and at the time of his retirement in 2015, had one of the longest congressional careers in Brazilian history.

== Early life ==
Born in Pinheiro, Maranhão, as José Ribamar Ferreira de Araújo Costa, he was the son of Sarney de Araújo Costa, a wealthy land-owner and sugarcane producer, and Kiola Ferreira. His family has origins in Viseu in Portugal. He attended Colégio Marista and the Licéu Maranhense before attending the Federal University of Maranhão. In 1953, he graduated from the federal university receiving his bachelor's degree in law. After his graduation, he launched a postmodernist literary journal titled A Ilha.

In 1965 he legally adopted the name José Sarney de Araújo Costa, usually shortened to José Sarney, for electoral purposes. He was known as "Zé do Sarney", as in "José, son of Sarney". Sarney's father acquired the name after being born on a land owned by an Englishman named "Sir Ney".

== Political career ==
=== Early activities ===
Sarney started his political career in the 1950s after becoming a replacement deputy and later as a federal deputy in 1955. He was a member of the centre-right National Democratic Union (União Democrática Nacional—UDN), aligned with the progressive wing of the party. He strongly supported so-called "Revolution of 1964", a military coup that overthrew leftist President João Goulart in 1964. After the military coup, Sarney followed most of the UDN into the National Renewal Alliance (ARENA), the political party of the military government. He was elected governor of the state of Maranhão in 1966, serving until 1971. He was then elected to the Brazilian Senate and became ARENA's president.

=== Vice presidency ===
Despite his support for the government's heavy-handed measures against dissent, Sarney had never been quite accepted by the military establishment, which tried to block his career. In 1979 ARENA reorganized as the Democratic Social Party (PDS), and Sarney remained the party's president. In 1984, the junta was under pressure due to popular protests to reinstate direct elections for president (Diretas Já movement). PDS was divided but launched Paulo Maluf as its candidate for the presidency in indirect elections.

Sarney disagreed with this decision and left PDS to form the Liberal Front Party (PFL), which then allied with the PMDB. As part of the deal, Sarney became Tancredo Neves' running mate on the opposition ticket. Neves won the election of 15 January 1985, but became gravely ill the night before his inauguration. Sarney assumed office as vice-president and acting president until Neves died on 21 April, and he formally became the first civilian president in 21 years.

=== Presidency ===
Sarney's succession raised some question because as Neves could not attend the inauguration ceremony on 15 March, several politicians contended at the time that Sarney should not have been inaugurated as vice-president and allowed to become acting president. They believed that Sarney had been elected vice-president only by virtue of the election of his running mate as president. Each member of the Electoral College cast one vote, for president, and the choice of president carried with it the automatic selection of the ticket's running mate as vice-president, Sarney could take office only as vice-president together with Neves. Some critics argued that in the event of the head of the presidential ticket not being able to assume office, the presidential powers and duties should pass to the speaker of the Chamber of Deputies, Ulysses Guimarães.

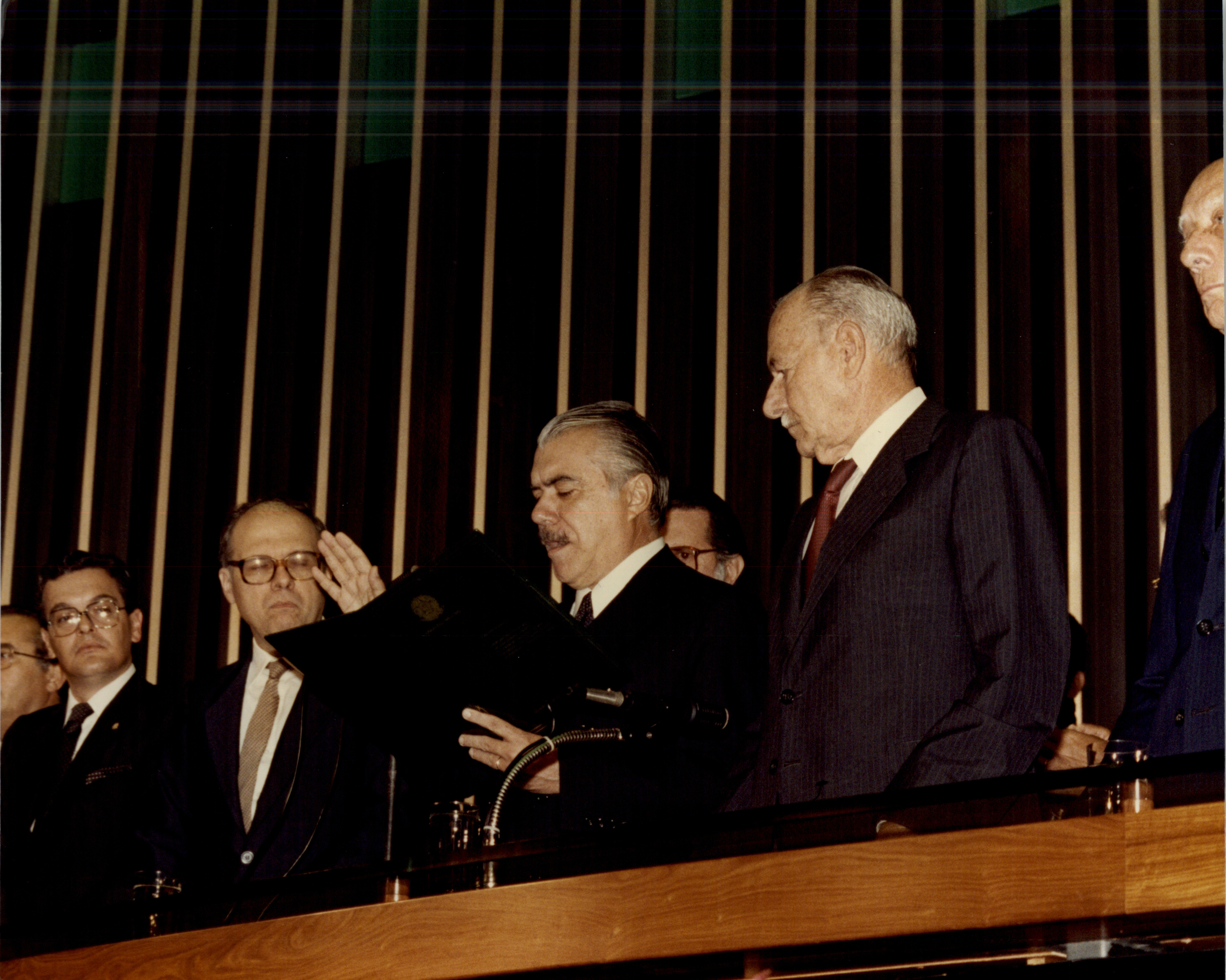
Sarney takes the oath of office as Vice President of Brazil on 15 March 1985, immediately becoming Acting President

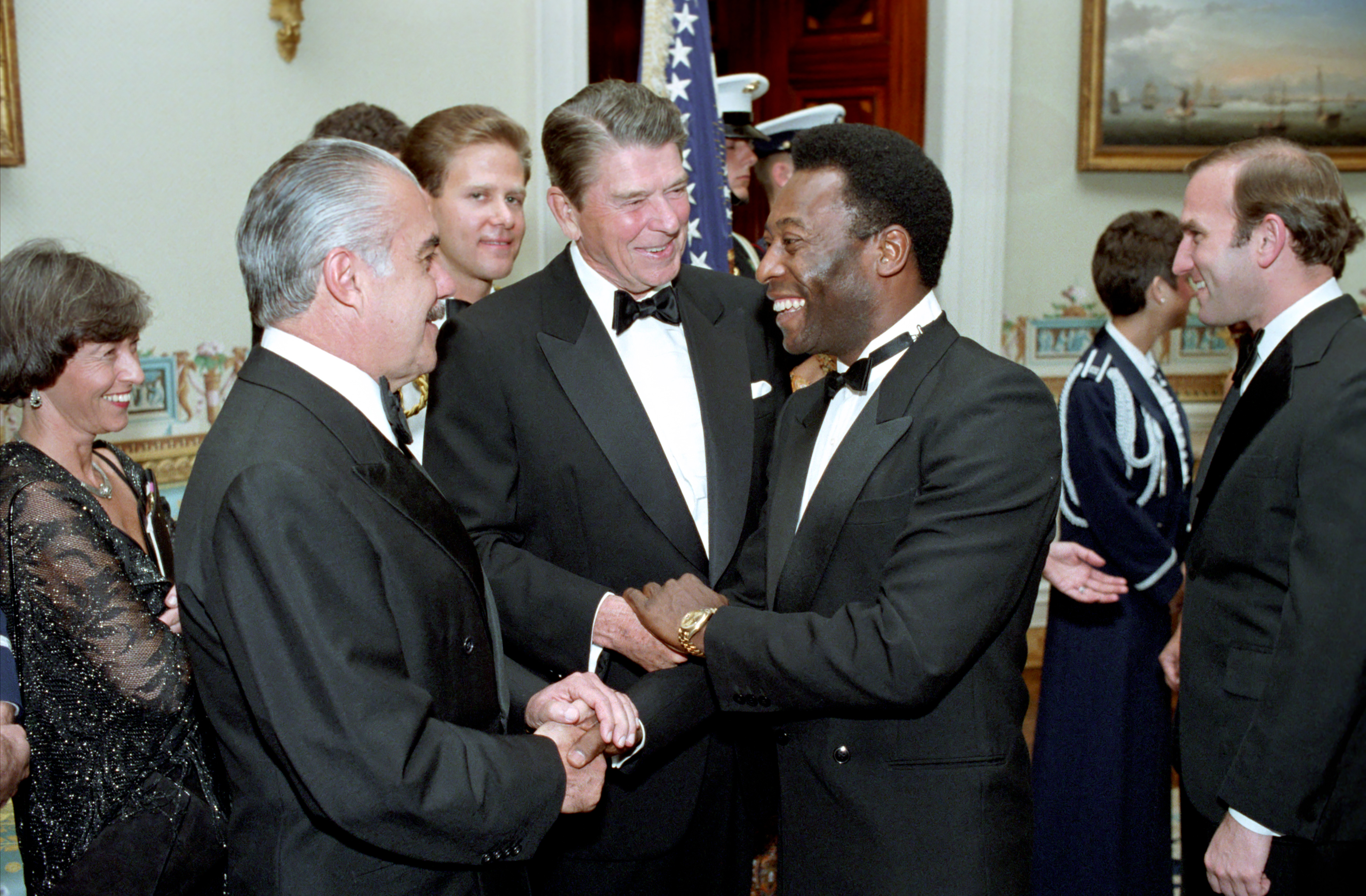
President Sarney with U.S. President Ronald Reagan and Pelé during a state dinner at the White House, 1986

There was some partisanship in this line of thought since both Neves and Guimarães were members of the same party, and Sarney was not. He had been a supporter of the military, and only recently had joined the coalition to defeat the military's candidate in the electoral college. The challenge to Sarney's inauguration was short-lived, however, because in the early hours of inauguration day, Guimarães himself stated that he believed that Sarney had the right to be inaugurated even without Neves, as the role of the vice-president was precisely that of replacing the president when needed.

Sarney and the president of Argentina, Raúl Alfonsín, started the process of creating a common market between the two nations in 1985. As first steps, they agreed to subsidize regional trade with a special currency for the purpose (the Gaucho). The agreement led to the formation of the Mercosur in 1991. He also oversaw constitutional amendments that purged the remaining vestiges of authoritarianism from the 1967/1969 Constitution.

Sarney faced many problems: enormous foreign debt, rampant inflation and corruption as well as the transition to democracy. During his presidency, the country had a 934% inflation rate and was overshadowed with union strikes and corruption scandals. Sarney launched an economic plan to stabilize the economy, called "Plano Cruzado", successful at first. The inflation worsened however under Sarney's Plano Cruzado. A new, fully democratic constitution was promulgated in 1988, and in the following year, the first direct elections since 1960 were held. Sarney was barred from running for president in his own right in that election. In Brazil, whenever the vice president ascends as president, it counts as a full term. At the time, Brazilian presidents were barred from immediate re-election.

=== Post-presidency ===
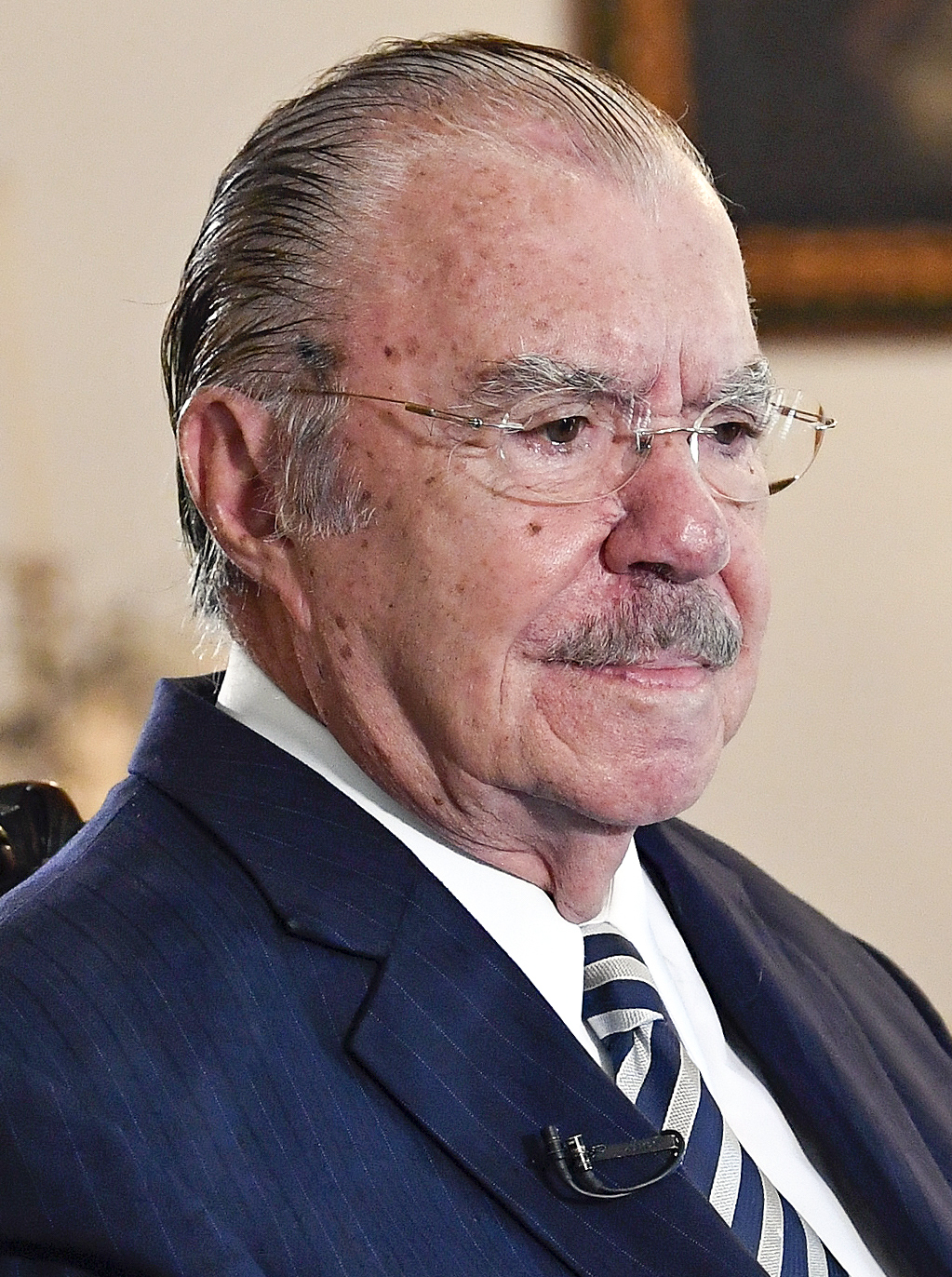
Sarney in March 2020

Sarney supported Fernando Henrique Cardoso as presidential candidate in 1994 and 1998 and Luiz Inácio Lula da Silva in 2002. He returned to the Senate after his presidency, this time representing Amapá, and served as President of the Senate from 1995 to 1997, 2003 to 2005, 2009 to 2011, and 2011 to 2013. He retired from politics in 2015 and was the longest-serving member of the Brazilian Congress at the time of his retirement. His retirement was noted by The New York Times as a "decline of a political dynasty" which would cause a political shift in the country. All told, he spent all but 23 months in elected office from his first election as deputy in 1955 until his retirement from the Senate in 2015.

Sarney is regarded as the foremost of Brazil's oligarchs. Sarney owns the most important newspapers and television stations in Maranhão. Sarney has also faced multiple allegations of nepotism and corruption in his career. In 2009, the British weekly The Economist called his election as President of the Senate "a victory for semi-feudalism" and "a throwback to an era of semi-feudal politics that still prevails in corners of Brazil and holds the rest of it back." Veja columnist Roberto Pompeu de Toledo deemed him "the perfect oligarch".

Sérgio Machado, former president of Transpetro, said in his plea agreement within the Operation Car Wash that Sarney received R$18.5 million of the bribe money from a Petrobras subsidiary, in the PMDB account during the period in which he directed the company (2003–2015).

Sarney appeared casting his vote during the 2026 presidential election during the runoff vote of October 25.

=== Electoral history ===
| Year | Election | Party | Office | Coalition | Partners | Party | Votes | Percent | Result |
|---|---|---|---|---|---|---|---|---|---|
| 1965 | State Election of Maranhão | UDN | Governor | Allied Oppositions (UDN, PSP, PTN) | Antônio Dino | PSP | 121,062 | 53.63% | Elected |
| 1970 | State Election of Maranhão | ARENA | Senator | —N/a | Odilo Costa Filho | ARENA | 236,618 | 42.35% | Elected |
| 1978 | State Election of Maranhão | ARENA | Senator | —N/a | Bello Parga | ARENA | 409,633 | 64.16% | Elected |
| 1985 | Presidential Election | MDB | Vice President | Democratic Alliance (PMDB, Liberal Front) | Tancredo Neves | MDB | 480 | 72.73% | Elected |
| 1990 | State Election of Amapá | MDB | Senator | —N/a | Paulo Guerra | MDB | 53,004 | 24.55% | Elected |
| 1990 | State Election of Amapá | MDB | Senator | —N/a | Marcos Rocha | MDB | 53,004 | 24.55% | Elected |
| 1998 | State Election of Amapá | MDB | Senator | Fight Front (PMDB, PFL, PSDB, PPB, PL, PSL, PTB, PRONA, PMN, PSD) | Jorge Nova | MDB | 97,446 | 59.31% | Elected |
| 1998 | State Election of Amapá | MDB | Senator | Fight Front (PMDB, PFL, PSDB, PPB, PL, PSL, PTB, PRONA, PMN, PSD) | Salomão Alcolumbre | MDB | 97,446 | 59.31% | Elected |
| 2006 | State Election of Amapá | MDB | Senator | Union for Amapá (PDT, PP, PMDB, PSC, PV, PRONA) | Salomão Alcolumbre | MDB | 152,486 | 53.87% | Elected |
| 2006 | State Election of Amapá | MDB | Senator | Union for Amapá (PDT, PP, PMDB, PSC, PV, PRONA) | Jorge Nova | MDB | 152,486 | 53.87% | Elected |

== Personal life ==
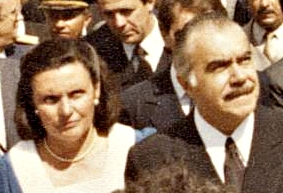
Sarney with his wife Marly Macieira

In 1952, Sarney married Marly Macieira. Their children are Congressman José Sarney Filho, Governor Roseana Sarney, and the businessman Fernando Sarney.

As a writer, his best known work is the poetry book Os Marimbondos de Fogo ("The Fire Wasps"). Sarney was elected to a chair in the Brazilian Academy of Letters in 1980.

In April 2012, Sarney was hospitalized and underwent an angioplasty. In July 2021, he was hospitalized for pleural effusion and had a procedure to remove fluid from his lungs.

In July 2023, Sarney was hospitalized after a fall and was diagnosed with cerebral ischemia.

He released three novels in 2025: O Dono do Mar, Saraminda, and A Duquesa Vale uma Missa.

== Awards and decorations ==
Below is a selected list of awards Sarney has received:

=== National honours ===
| Ribbon bar | Honour | Date |
|---|---|---|
| | Grand Cross of the Order of the Southern Cross | 1985 – automatic upon taking presidential office |
| | Grand Cross of the Order of Rio Branco | 1985 – automatic upon taking presidential office |
| | Grand Cross of the Order of Military Merit | 1995 – automatic upon taking presidential office |
| | Grand Cross of the Order of Naval Merit | 1985 – automatic upon taking presidential office |
| | Grand Cross of the Order of Aeronautical Merit | 1985 – automatic upon taking presidential office |
| | Grand Cross of the Order of Military Judicial Merit | 1985 – automatic upon taking presidential office |
| | Grand Cross of the National Order of Merit | 1985 – automatic upon taking presidential office |

=== Foreign honours ===
| Ribbon bar | Country | Honour |
|---|---|---|
| | France | Grand Cross of the Legion of Honour |
| Sacro Militare Ordine Costantiniano di San Giorgio | Italy | Medal of the Sacred Military Constantinian Order of Saint George |
| Den kongelige norske fortjenstorden storkors stripe | Norway | Grand Cross of the Royal Norwegian Order of Merit |
| PER Order of the Sun of Peru - Grand Cross BAR | Peru | Grand Cross with diamonds of the Order of the Sun of Peru |
| PRT Order of Saint James of the Sword - Grand Collar BAR | Portugal | Collar of the Military Order of Saint James of the Sword |
| | Portugal | Grand Cross of the Order of Christ |
| | Portugal | Grand Cross of the Order of Prince Henry |
| | Romania | Grand Cross of the Order of the Star of Romania |

== See also ==
- List of presidents of Brazil
- History of Brazil (1964-present)
- Presidency of Sarney

Political offices
| Preceded by Newton Bello | Governor of Maranhão; 1966–1970 | Succeeded by Antônio Dino |
| Preceded by Aureliano Chaves | Vice President of Brazil; 1985 (de jure) | Vacant Title next held by Itamar Franco |
| Preceded by João Figueiredo | President of Brazil; 21 April 1985 – 15 March 1990; Acting: 15 March – 21 April 1985 | Succeeded by Fernando Collor |
| Preceded by Tancredo Neves; Elect | President of Brazil; 21 April 1985 – 15 March 1990; Acting: 15 March – 21 April 1985 | Succeeded by Fernando Collor |
| Preceded by Humberto Lucena | President of the Federal Senate; 1995–1997; 2003–2005; 2009–2013 | Succeeded by Antônio Carlos Magalhães |
| Preceded by Ramez Tebet | President of the Federal Senate; 1995–1997; 2003–2005; 2009–2013 | Succeeded by Renan Calheiros |
| Preceded by Garibaldi Alves Filho | President of the Federal Senate; 1995–1997; 2003–2005; 2009–2013 | Succeeded by Renan Calheiros |
Academic offices
| Preceded by José Américo de Almeida | 6th Academic of the 38th chair of the Brazilian Academy of Letters; 6 November 1980–present | Incumbent |
