= Aureliano Chaves =

Vice President of Brazil from 1979 to 1985

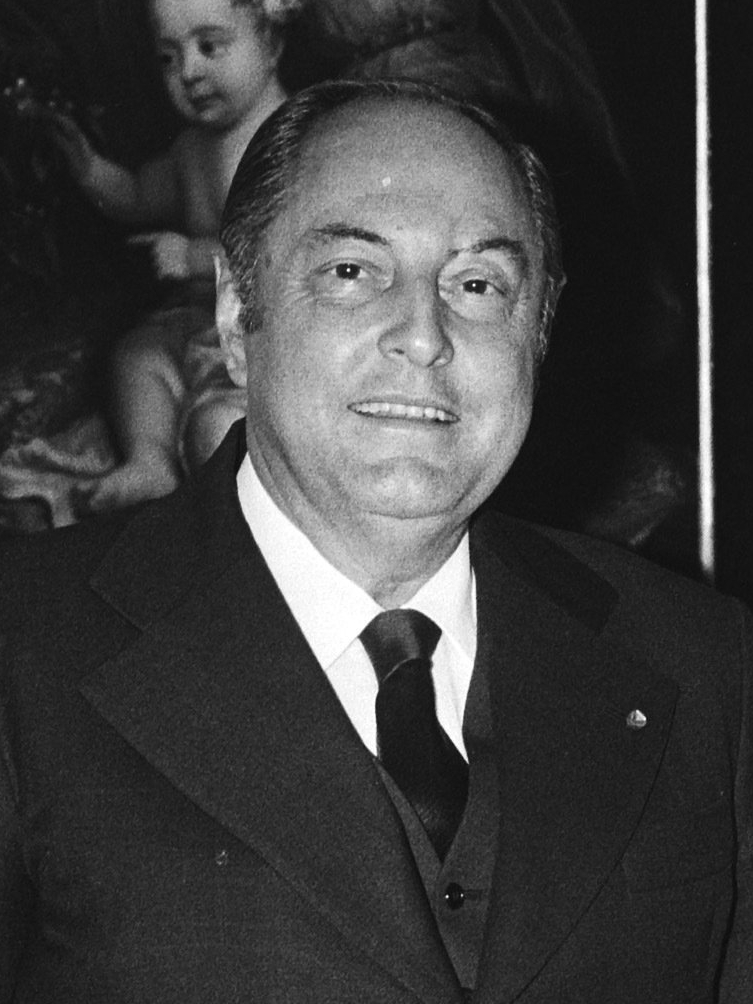

19th Vice President of Brazil
- In office 15 March 1979 – 15 March 1985
- President: João Figueiredo
- Preceded by: Adalberto Pereira dos Santos
- Succeeded by: José Sarney

Minister of Mines and Energy
- In office 15 March 1985 – 22 December 1988
- President: José Sarney
- Preceded by: César Cals
- Succeeded by: Iris Rezende

Governor of Minas Gerais
- In office 15 March 1975 – 5 July 1978
- Vice Governor: Levindo Ozanam Coelho
- Preceded by: Rondon Pacheco
- Succeeded by: Levindo Ozanam Coelho

Member of the Chamber of Deputies
- In office 1 February 1967 – 1 February 1975
- Constituency: Minas Gerais

State Deputy of Minas Gerais
- In office 1 February 1959 – 1 February 1967
- Constituency: At-large

Personal details
- Born: 13 January 1929 Três Pontas, Minas Gerais, Brazil
- Died: 30 April 2003 (aged 74) Belo Horizonte, Minas Gerais, Brazil
- Party: UDN (Before 1966); ARENA (1966–1979); PDS (1979–1985); PFL (1985–2003)
- Spouse: Vivi Chaves

Aureliano Chaves (13 January 1929 – 30 April 2003) was a Brazilian politician.

Born in Três Pontas, state of Minas Gerais, he was a Representative of this state in the Chamber of Deputies in 1967 from the ARENA party. He was selected as the governor of Minas Gerais state from 1975 to 1978 and was elected vice-president in 1979 under João Baptista de Oliveira Figueiredo. He acted as president during Figueiredo's health crisis in 1981 and 1983.

After the democratization of Brazil, he ran unsuccessfully for the presidency of Brazil. After the elections of 1989 he retired from politics.

== See also ==
- List of governors of Minas Gerais

Political offices
Preceded by Adalberto Pereira dos Santos	Vice President of Brazil; 1979–1985	Vacant Title next held by Itamar Franco
