= João Figueiredo =

President of Brazil from 1979 to 1985

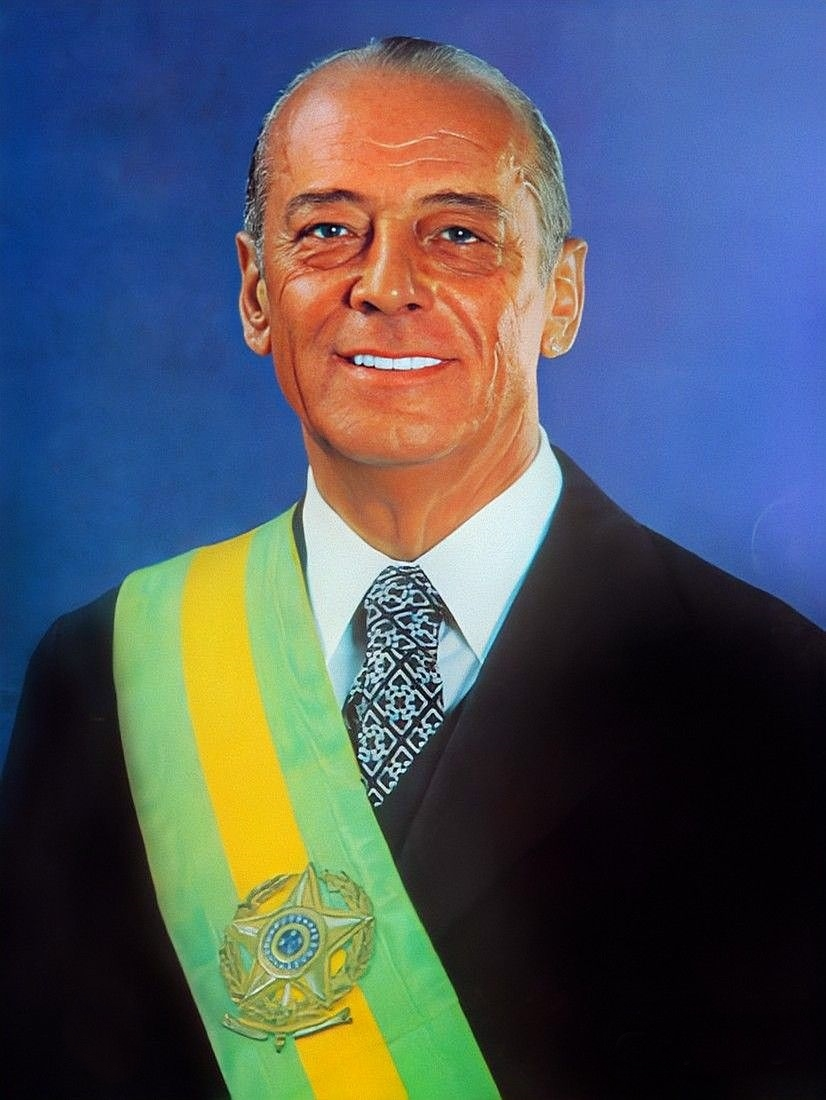
- Official portrait, 1979

30th President of Brazil
- In office 15 March 1979 – 15 March 1985
- Vice President: Aureliano Chaves
- Preceded by: Ernesto Geisel
- Succeeded by: José Sarney

Head of the National Information Service
- In office 15 March 1974 – 15 June 1978
- Nominated by: Ernesto Geisel
- Preceded by: Carlos Alberto da Fontoura
- Succeeded by: Otávio Aguiar de Medeiros

Chief Minister of the Military Cabinet
- In office 30 October 1969 – 15 March 1974
- Nominated by: Emílio Garrastazu Médici
- Preceded by: Jaime Portela de Melo
- Succeeded by: Hugo de Abreu

Personal details
- Born: 15 January 1918 Rio de Janeiro, Federal District, Brazil
- Died: 24 December 1999 (aged 81) Rio de Janeiro, Rio de Janeiro, Brazil
- Resting place: São Francisco Xavier Cemetery
- Party: PSD (1989-1999); PDS (1980–1989); Independent (1979-1980); ARENA (1978–1979)
- Spouse: Dulce Castro (m. 1942)
- Children: 2
- Education: Military School of Realengo; Officers Improvement School
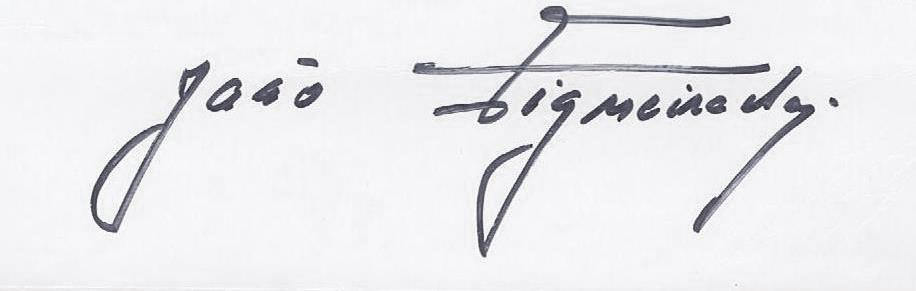
- Signature

Military service
- Allegiance: Brazil
- Branch/service: Brazilian Army
- Years of service: 1935–1979
- Rank: Army General
- Commands: See list: National Information Service Rio de Janeiro Section; Department of Public Security of São Paulo; 1st Guards Cavalry Regiment; General Staff of the Third Army
- Battles/wars: Brazilian communist uprising of 1935; 1964 Brazilian coup d'état

João Baptista de Oliveira Figueiredo (Portuguese: [ʒuˈɐ̃w baˈtʃistɐ dʒi oliˈvejɾɐ fiɡejˈɾedu, ˈʒwɐ̃w -]; 15 January 1918 – 24 December 1999) was a Brazilian military officer who served as the 30th president of Brazil from 1979 to 1985, and the last of the military regime that ruled the country following the 1964 Brazilian coup d'état. He was chief of the Secret Service (SNI) during the term of his predecessor, Ernesto Geisel, who appointed him to the presidency at the end of his own term.

Amendments to the Constitution increased the presidential term length from five to six years, while Figueiredo's presidency continued the political liberalization started under Geisel. Shortly after taking office, he approved a broad amnesty for politicians who had been removed from office under the Institutional Acts. In 1980, the two-party system was abolished, leading to the creation of the Brazilian Democratic Movement Party (PMDB) as the successor to the MDB and the Democratic Social Party (PDS) as the successor to ARENA, along with several new parties. Figueiredo joined the PDS. On September 22, 1981, he was awarded Portugal's Grand Collar of the Military Order of Saint James of the Sword. In 1982, electoral reforms were introduced to secure a majority for the ruling PDS in the upcoming elections against four opposition parties. However, his presidency saw several terrorist attacks attributed to hardline right-wing and military factions.

Figueiredo's term was marked by a severe global economic crisis, rising international interest rates, the second oil shock of 1979, and skyrocketing inflation, which surged from 45% to 230% over six years. Brazil's foreign debt exceeded $100 billion for the first time, forcing the government to seek assistance from the International Monetary Fund (IMF) in 1982. That same year, the state of Rondônia was created. In 1983, the Diretas Já movement pushed for direct presidential elections, but the proposal was rejected by Congress. However, the Figueiredo administration allowed an indirect presidential election, ultimately leading to the end of Brazil's military regime.

According to CIA documents, João Figueiredo supported the continuation of summary executions of political dissidents, in violation of legal and constitutional norms, as well as human rights principles.

== Biography ==
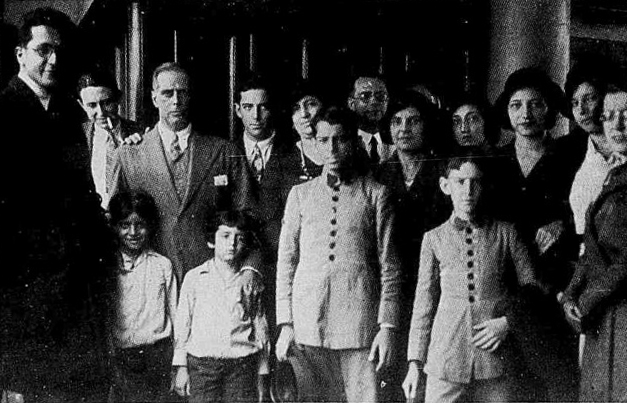
14-year-old Figueiredo (center, in cadet uniform) with his family and others aboard Itajubá, 18 October 1932

João Baptista de Oliveira Figueiredo was born in Rio de Janeiro at 11:30 BRT on 15 January 1918. He was the son of General Euclides Figueiredo and Valentina Silva de Oliveira Figueiredo, the third of six siblings.

His father was exiled for trying to topple the Estado Novo regime of Getúlio Vargas in 1938. Two of his brothers were also generals. The family could trace its origins in Brazil to the 1650s, having arrived from Barcelos in Northern Portugal and owning several slaves and sugar plantations. After studying at military schools of Porto Alegre and Realengo, Figueiredo was promoted to captain (1944) and to major (1952). He served as the Brazilian military attache in Paraguay (1955–1957) and worked for secret service of the Army General Staff (1959–1960). In 1961 he was transferred to the National Security Council. While teaching at the Army General Staff Command College (1961–1964), Figueiredo was promoted to colonel and appointed the department head in the National Information Service. In 1966 he assumed the command of public defense force in São Paulo. In 1967–1969 he commanded a regiment in Rio de Janeiro and was promoted to general. When General Emílio Garrastazu Médici assumed the presidency, Figueiredo was appointed head of the president's military staff (30 October 1969 – 15 March 1974).

Figueiredo as Chief Minister of the Military Cabinet, 1972

In 1974 he assumed the leadership of the National Intelligence Service of Brazil (15 March 1974 – 14 June 1978), a Brazil's internal security agency. Picked by President Ernesto Geisel as his successor, Figueiredo campaigned vigorously, even though he could not possibly be defeated; the president was elected by a legislature dominated by the pro-military National Renewal Alliance Party. As expected, he won easily against the nominal opposition candidate, General Monteiro.

As president, he continued the gradual abertura (democratization) process instituted in 1974. An amnesty law, signed by Figueiredo on 28 August 1979, amnestied those convicted of "political or related" crimes between 1961 and 1978. In the early 1980s, the military regime could no longer effectively maintain the two-party system established in 1966. The Figueiredo administration dissolved the government-controlled National Renewal Alliance Party (ARENA) and allowed new parties to be formed. In 1981 the Congress enacted a law to restore direct elections of state governors. The general election of 1982 brought victory to ARENA's successor, the pro-government Democratic Social Party (43.22% of the vote), and to the opposition Brazilian Democratic Movement Party (42.96%).

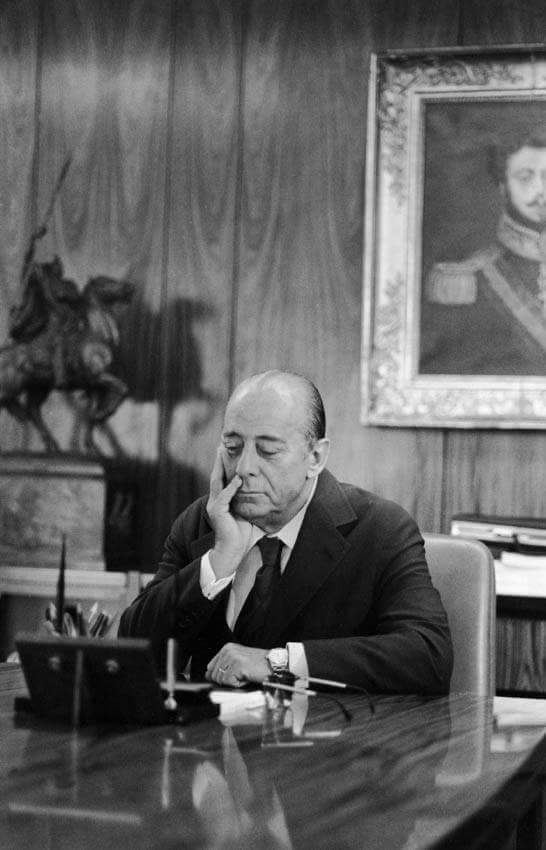
Figueiredo at the Palácio do Planalto during his presidency; behind him is a portrait of Pedro I, Brazil's first emperor.

The governorships of three major states—São Paulo, Rio de Janeiro, and Minas Gerais—were won by the opposition. However, political developments were overshadowed by economic problems. As inflation and unemployment soared, foreign debt reached massive proportions, making Brazil the world's largest debtor, owing about US$90 billion to international lenders. The government's austerity program showed no signs of economic recovery by the end of Figueiredo's term. The president suffered a heart attack and sustained injuries from horse riding, requiring two extended medical leaves in 1981 and 1983. However, his civilian vice president, Antônio Aureliano Chaves de Mendonça, did not wield significant political power. The opposition vigorously campaigned for a constitutional amendment to allow direct popular presidential elections in November 1984, but the proposal failed to pass in Congress. Instead, opposition candidate Tancredo Neves succeeded Figueiredo after Congress held an indirect election for the new president.

=== Post presidency and death ===
After his presidency, Figueiredo did not return to politics and lived away from public attention. He would live his last years in his apartment in São Conrado, in the South Zone of Rio de Janeiro. At 9:35 BRST on 24 December 1999, at the age of 81, Figueredo died due to kidney and heart failure. After his death President Fernando Henrique Cardoso declared three days of mourning. He is buried in the Caju Cemetery in Rio de Janeiro.

== 1978 electoral college results ==
Candidate	Running mate	Party	Votes	%
João Figueiredo	Aureliano Chaves	National Renewal Alliance	355	61.10
Euler Bentes Monteiro	Paulo Brossard	Brazilian Democratic Movement	226	38.90
Total			581	100.00
Valid votes			581	98.14
Invalid/blank votes			11	1.86
Total votes			592	100.00
Registered voters/turnout			592	100.00

== Gallery ==
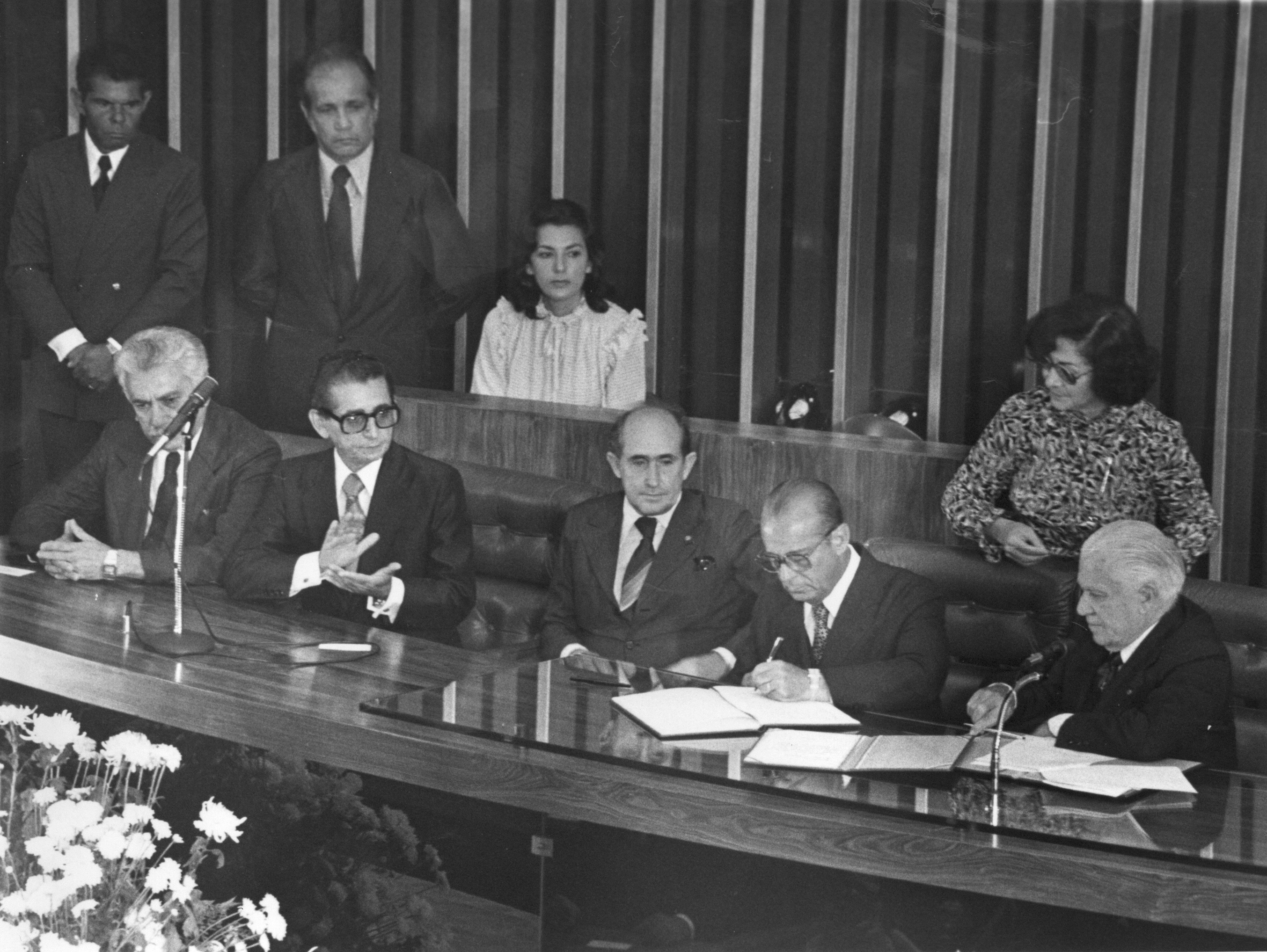
Figueiredo signs official documents during his inauguration ceremony in the National Congress, 15 March 1979

João (right) and Dulce Figueiredo with U.S. President Ronald Reagan and First Lady Nancy Reagan before a State Dinner at the White House, 12 May 1982

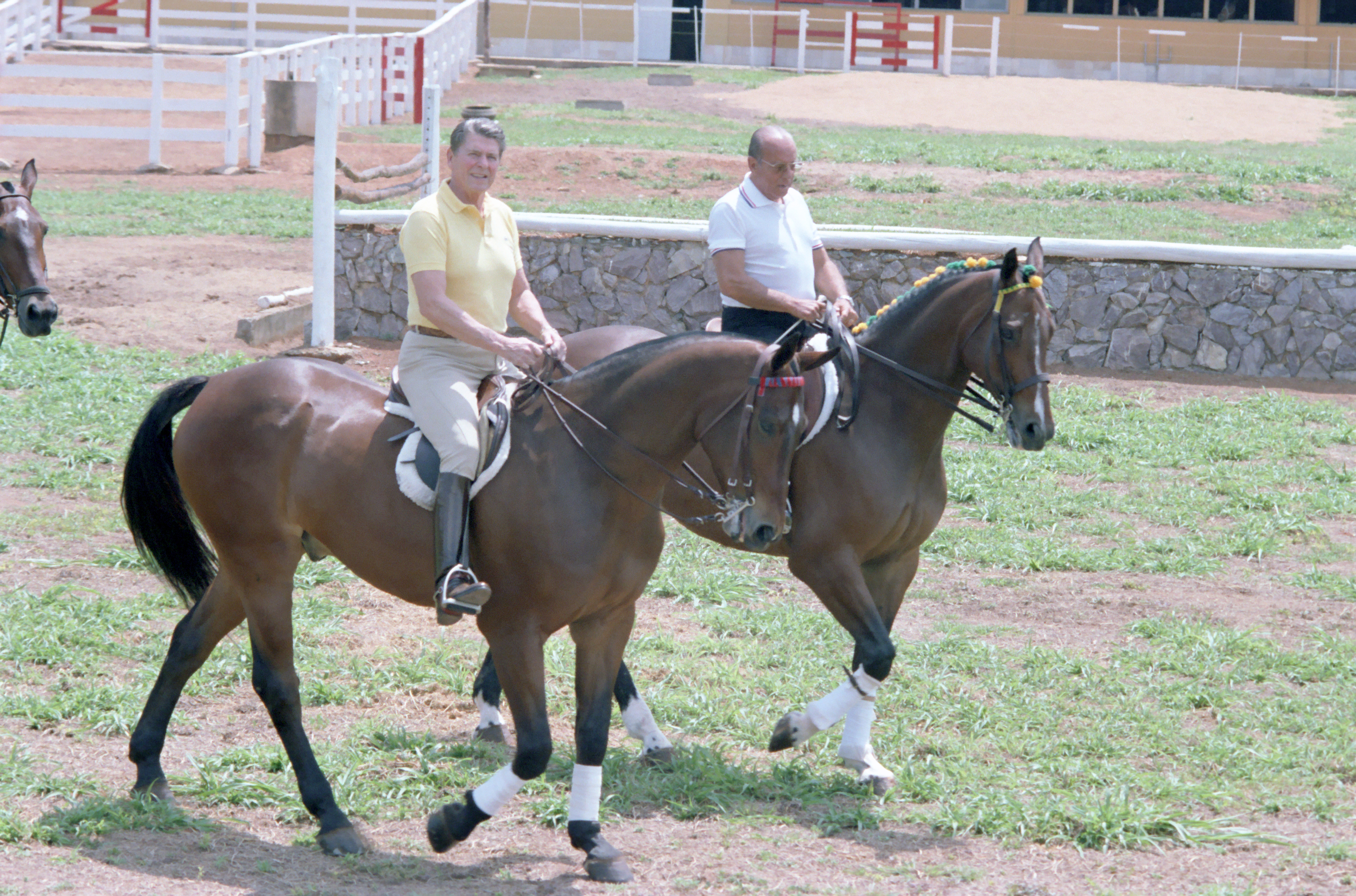
Presidents Figueiredo and Reagan riding horses in Brasília, 1 December 1982

== Honours ==
=== Foreign honours ===
- Grand Cross of the Military Order of Aviz (27 July 1972)
- Grand Cross of the Military Order of Christ (26 July 1973)
- Grand Collar of the Military Order of Saint James of the Sword (22 September 1981)
- Collar of the Order of Isabella the Catholic (9 May 1983)
- Grand Cross of the Order of Prince Henry (2 July 1991)

== See also ==
- List of presidents of Brazil

Political offices
Preceded by Jaime Portela de Melo	Chief Minister of the Military Cabinet; 1969–74	Succeeded by Hugo de Abreu
Preceded by Carlos Alberto da Fontoura	Head of the National Intelligence Service; 1974–78	Succeeded by Otávio Aguiar de Medeiros
Preceded by Ernesto Geisel	President of Brazil; 1979–85	Succeeded by Tancredo Neves; Elect, de jure
Preceded by Ernesto Geisel	President of Brazil; 1979–85	Succeeded by José Sarney
