= National Information Service (Brazil) =

Intelligence Agency of Brazil under the military government

- Serviço Nacional de Informações
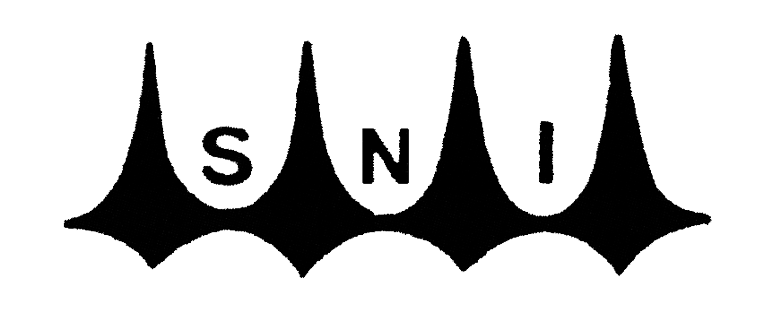

Agency overview
- Formed: 13 June 1964
- Preceding agency: Federal Service of Information and Counterinformation (SFICI)
- Dissolved: 15 March 1990
- Superseding agency: Department of Intelligence (DI/SAE)
- Jurisdiction: Federal government of Brazil
- Status: Dissolved
- Headquarters: Brasília, Federal District, Brazil
- Agency executives: Golbery do Couto e Silva, First Head; Ivan de Sousa Mendes, Last Head

The Serviço Nacional de Informações (English: National Information Service) or SNI was the intelligence agency of Brazil during its military dictatorship. It was created by President Castelo Branco via Law 4371/64 and remained active until dissolved by Fernando Collor in 1990. Intelligence activities in Brazil were then subordinate to the Brazilian Federal Police until Fernando Henrique Cardoso sanctioned Law 9883/97, which created the Brazilian Intelligence Agency.

== History ==
Originally, the SNI was a civilian agency under the retired General Golbery do Couto e Silva in 1964. It provided Castelo Branco with an alternative intelligence source and was initially trained by the PIDE of the Salazar regime.

After the political dominance of Brazilian hard-liners in 1967, the SNI came under military control and began to be trained by the CIA. The agency was the backbone of the regime's anti-communist actions. Although there have been secret police in Brazil since at least the Vargas era, military involvement reached new heights with the creation of the SNI. It grew out of the Institute for Research and Social Studies (Instituto de Pesquisas e Estudos Sociais or IPES), which Couto e Silva had established to undermine the former Goulart government (1961–64).

In 1973, control over the domestic intelligence community with the opening of the Escola Nacional de Informações (EsNI or National Intelligence School) was established. The following year, the EsNI absorbed the Escola Superior de Guerra postgraduate intelligence course.

Supposedly, the EsNI did not train police agents and selected its own students. By 1980 some officers were saying that the EsNI would be as useful as the ESG to their careers.

== Structure ==
In theory, the SNI supervised and coordinated the intelligence agencies of the three services, but in practice the service agencies maintained their autonomy.

The three service agencies were:

- The Army Information Center (Centro de Informações do Exército, or CIE)
- The Air force Information Center (Centro de Informações da Aeronáutica, or CISA)
- The Naval Information Center (Centro de Informações de Marinha, or Cenimar).

The branch chiefs of staff were technically responsible for the intelligence work in their designated service. But in fact, CIE activities followed a parallel chain of command, and so the officers were often left uninformed.

Each command also had an Informations Operations Department-Internal Defense Operations Center (Portuguese: Departamento de Operações de Informações-Centro de Operações de Defesa Interna)—known as DOI-CODI.

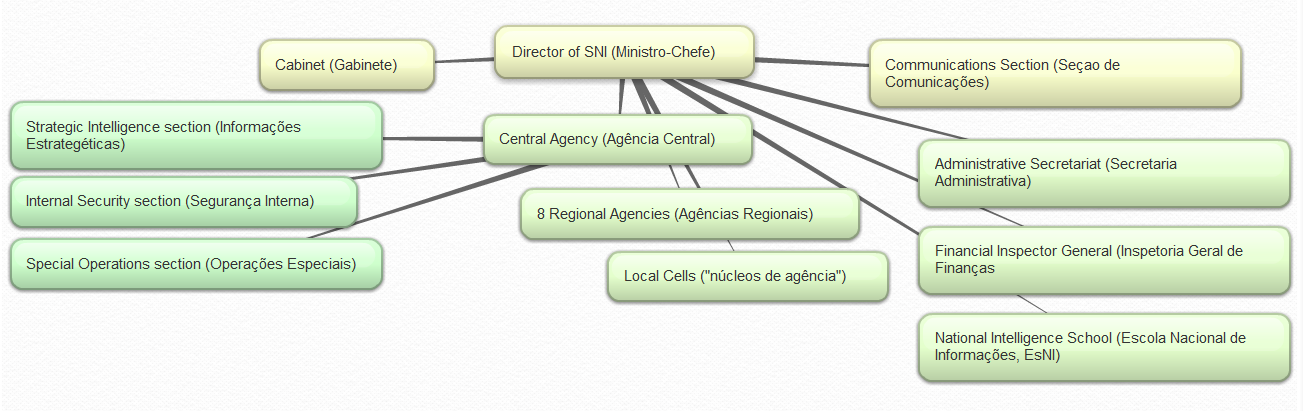
SNI Organizational Chart

== CIE ==
From the outset, there was resistance to the idea of the CIE. In 1966 President Castelo Branco rejected the idea of creating an army intelligence service, because it would weaken the General Staff. The next year, 1967, the new minister of the army, General Aurélio de Lira Tavares, established the CIE over the objections of the chief of staff, General Orlando Geisel.

As early as 1968, the CIE began bombing theaters, destroying bookstores, and kidnapping people. When insurgents began terrorist violence in late 1968, the CIE expanded to about 200 officers and began a counter-offensive, eliminating all signs of violence in three years.

President Geisel, a retired general, struggled to have his orders fulfilled by the CIE system. Consequently, the CIE sought to undermine his government and to make Army Minister Sylvio Couto Coelho da Frota the next president. The CIE also waged a pamphlet war against the previously mentioned Couto e Silva, chief of Geisel's Civilian Household, who wanted to shut down the CIE.

== Methods of surveillance ==
The SNI provided clearance for anyone seeking a government job or requesting to conduct research in the army archives. Using an elaborate system of informants and telephone taps, the SNI accumulated and analyzed reports on many sources.

One study by political scientist David V. Fleischer and Robert Wesson suggests that there were as many as 50,000 persons employed in the SNI during the 1964-85 regime. Furthermore, both Presidents Médici and Figueiredo had been SNI chiefs.

== Notable differences ==
Alfred Stepan, a professor of political science at Columbia University, observed that the SNI differed from similar agencies in other countries. In retrospect, he noted that it had quite a monopoly in operations and training, with a voice as a ministry in the presidential cabinet and representation in almost every facet of public life. High-ranking officials helped achieve SNI security goals through their government positions. Moreover, the SNI was completely autonomous, giving it an unprecedented power.

== See also ==
- Department of Political and Social Order
- Operation Condor
