= 1964 Brazilian coup in the Paraíba Valley =

Military deployments during the 1964 Brazilian coup d'état

Confrontation between the 1st and 2nd Armies
- Part of the 1964 Brazilian coup d'état
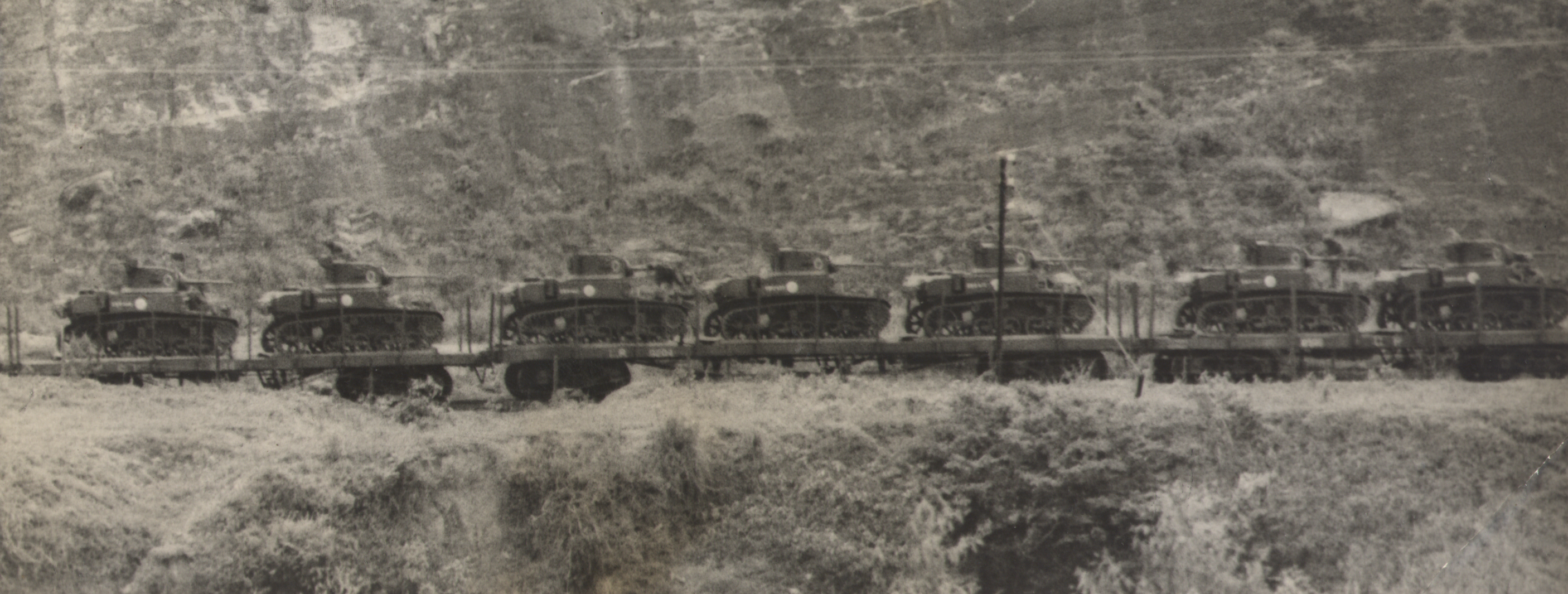
- 2nd Army tanks being transported by rail
Date	1 April 1964
Location	Brazil
Result	Rebel victory: Surrender of the 1st Army

Belligerents
Rebels: Brazilian Army (rebel); AMAN	Loyalists: Brazilian Army

Commanders and leaders
Amaury Kruel; Aluísio Miranda Mendes; Emílio Garrastazu Médici	Armando de M. Ancora; Anfrísio da Rocha Lima

Units involved
2nd Army; 2nd Infantry Division; 1st Army (rebel); AMAN cadet corps; 1st Armored Infantry Battalion	1st Army (loyalist); School Units Group

Strength
250 AMAN infantry soldiers; 70-80 AMAN cavalry soldiers; Howitzer Battery	800 soldiers in the GUE's vanguard battalion; 3 Howitzer batteries; Tank company

The Paraíba Valley was the stage of military deployments by opposing forces during the 1964 Brazilian coup d'état: the rebel 2nd Army, coming from São Paulo towards Rio de Janeiro along the Via Dutra highway, and the loyalist School-Unit Group (Grupamento de Unidades-Escola; GUEs), coming from Rio de Janeiro in the opposite direction. The 2nd Army was commanded by General Amaury Kruel, in rebellion against the government of president João Goulart. The GUEs, led by Anfrísio da Rocha Lima, was subordinated to General Armando de Morais Âncora, from the 1st Army. Such movements were in progress or preparation in the early hours of 1 April, although the loyalist 2nd Army General Euryale de Jesus Zerbini delayed his army's movement. The Military Academy of Agulhas Negras (Academia Militar das Agulhas Negras; AMAN), led by General Emílio Garrastazu Médici, and the 1st Armored Infantry Battalion (1º Batalhão de Infantaria Blindado; 1º BIB), were halfway the road, respectively in the municipalities of Resende and Barra Mansa. Médici, forced to choose a side, joined the coup. The 1st BIB did the same.

In the morning, before the arrival of the 2nd Army and the GUEs, Médici occupied Resende and used his cadets to establish defensive positions along Via Dutra, towards Barra Mansa, from where he could resist the loyalists. The forces from São Paulo and Rio de Janeiro arrived around noon, with the former remaining further back, in Resende and Itatiaia, and the latter around Barra Mansa, with the academy's force in the middle, facing the loyalists. Combat, if it occurred, would begin between the cadets and GUEs soldiers. The loyalists were elite troops, with superior numbers and weaponry. The use of cadets on the front line also had a bad record in other countries. What Médici had in his favor was the effect of a "psychological brake" on the loyalist officers, who were unwilling to attack. Of the three artillery batteries sent against the academy, two immediately crossed the lines and defected to the rebels.

No confrontation occurred, as in the afternoon operations were interrupted by the arrival of generals Kruel and Âncora to negotiate within the academy. The defense mounted by Médici is considered important in forcing Âncora to negotiate, but it was part of a larger context of deterioration in the government's position. The resulting meeting "would once and for all mark the History of Brazil": the end of the 1st Army's resistance to the coup and the return of the troops to their barracks. Médici's reputation among the military grew, and his decision became part of the Army's collective memory.

The 1st BIB did not participate in the meeting of the military forces, as it was in Volta Redonda, where trade unionists, who opposed to the coup, unsuccessfully tried to paralyze the Companhia Siderúrgica Nacional, revealing themselves to be less organized than the military and industrial leaders.

== Military background ==
In a meeting with his generals around midnight on 31 March, Amaury Kruel sided his 2nd Army with the coup and ordered the invasion of Rio de Janeiro. At this time, the Tiradentes Detachment, a unit sent on campaign by general Olímpio Mourão Filho, had already crossed the border between Minas Gerais and Rio de Janeiro and come into contact with the loyalist forces sent from Guanabara and Petrópolis to confront it. By noon on 1 April, the detachment had advanced to the Areal region, facing the 2nd Infantry Regiment (2º Regimento de Infantaria; 2º RI). Meanwhile, the School-Unit Group (GUEs) would form the loyalist reaction to the 2nd Army.

Outside the Rio-São Paulo-Minas Gerais axis, São Paulo's western flank was Mato Grosso, whose 9th Military Region (9ª Região Militar; 9ª RM) was subordinate and loyal to the 2nd Army. The 16th Battalion of Caçadores, in Cuiabá, was ordered to advance to Brasília. The other flank was the southern region of Brazil, where the situation had not yet been decided until 2 April. The 5th Military Region, in Paraná and Santa Catarina, joined the coup, but not the entirety of the 3rd Army. Thus, on that day the 2nd Army sent reinforcements to the 5th Military Region, but the crisis ended before they were needed.

== Beginning of the deployments ==
=== General Zerbini and loyalist reinforcements ===
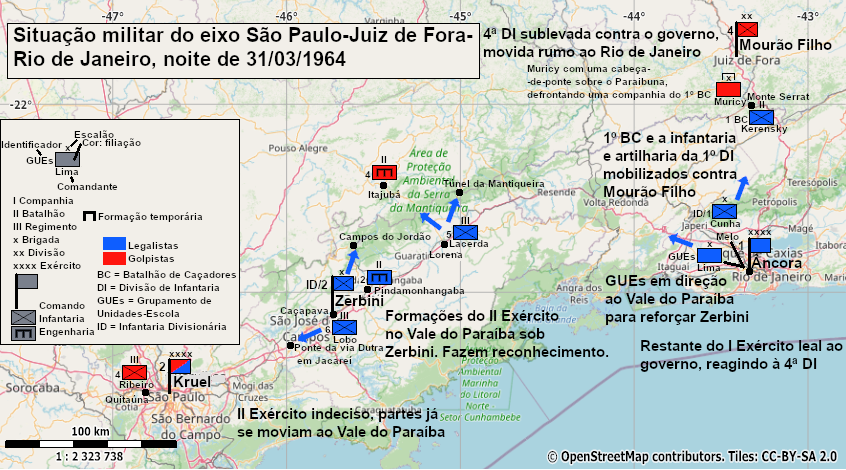
Orders given by Zerbini and their context

The "military apparatus" of João Goulart's government, that is, the group of officers considered loyal and appointed to important positions, had as one of its most important figures in São Paulo the brigade general Euryale de Jesus Zerbini, commander of the Divisional Infantry of the 2nd Infantry Division (2nd DI). Zerbini did not attend the meeting of generals in São Paulo; having arrived in the city from 18:30 to 19:00, he was called by his superior and commander of the 2nd Infantry Division, Aluísio Miranda Mendes, before entering the HQ. Both sided with the government, with Aluísio promising to arrest Kruel if he rebelled. Zerbini was tasked with commanding the forces in the Paraíba Valley, a possible São Paulo–Rio invasion route through the Via Dutra highway. The local garrison consisted of the 5th and 6th Infantry Regiments (RIs) and the 2nd Combat Engineering Battalion (2nd BE Cmb). Zerbini was to be ready to move them.

At 21:00, Zerbini arrived at his headquarters in Caçapava, confirmed the loyalty of his subordinates and sent them in the direction of the rebels in Minas Gerais: the 5th RI of Lorena would take up positions in the direction of Itajubá, where the 4th BE Cmb from Minas Gerais was located, and in the Mantiqueira Tunnel, while the 6th RI from Caçapava would advance to the Paraíba do Sul river bridge in Jacareí and Campos do Jordão, on the way to Minas Gerais. Reconnaissance teams observed nothing unusual in these places and the regiments remained on standby in their barracks. But as the situation changed, at 22:30 Zerbini refused Aluísio's call to São Paulo. Contacted by general Assis Brasil and the president himself at 23:00 and 23:30, Zerbini said he was loyal and in control, but unable to resist an advance by the rest of the 2nd Army, and was then informed he'd be reinforced by tanks and general Anfrísio da Rocha Lima's GUEs.

The School-Unit Group's artillery component was the Artillery School-Group (GEsA). Each day a battery was on standby, and on the 31st it was 1st Lieutenant Hamilton Otero Sanches' 2nd Battery. According to his testimony, his group lived a moment of tension, and subordinates were uninformed and heard nothing from superiors. At night, a call to the group ordered an entire battery to follow the Infantry School-Regiment (REsI). He obeyed, but only to follow orders, as his political position was against "so much anarchy in our country". At the suggestion of one of his staff officers, Captain Sílvio Pereira Brunner, he first consulted his commander. That was loyalist Colonel Aldo Pereira, who was sleeping. Once awake, he simply said "Yes, they called you, you will go", without showing the slightest interest in what one of his own batteries would do, negatively impressing Sanches. To save time, he presented himself without his troops to the REsI's commander, Colonel Abner Moreira. In what Sanches' saw as an absurd moment, Abner gave orders to his sub-unit even though it belonged to another formation whose commander was in the same barracks. He was sent to the Rio–São Paulo axis, leaving after midnight, and on the way he met the REsI battalion, which had already left, under Major Simon. They talked found themselves with a similar political position.

The 3rd Battery belonged to Captain Affonso de Alencastro Graça. He was, in contrast to the loyalists, "among those who thought something had to be done". Their operations staff officer, Captain Willy Seixas, and the battery commanders found that it would be impossible to rise up inside the barracks, as they would be surrounded. Instead, they agreed to move forward and, wherever they went, they would join the "revolutionary forces". The 3rd Battery and the 1st, of Captain José Antônio da Silveira, followed behind the vanguard.

The GUEs also had the 1st Group of 90mm anti-aircraft guns, from which the 2nd battery was moved, under Captain Brilhante Ustra. Ustra recounted an unusual arrangement: the soldiers, corporals and captain were actually from the 4th battery, and an older captain, Cavalero, accompanied him in the command jeep. Ustra had realized that the objective of the arrangement was for the most politically reliable elements, Cavalero and the sergeants, to take control, and after protests he managed to get the soldiers and corporal to be his own. In addition to the division between supporters and opponents of the government within the battery itself, it would leave without nurses and kitchen supplies and with very little food and water. A movement over asphalt would wear out the rubber tracks on the tractors that towed the guns, and the battery would be useless in providing anti-aircraft support to a moving column, as its function was to defend sensitive points and it took hours to get into position. This battery was to depart in the morning.

=== Movement of the 2nd Army ===
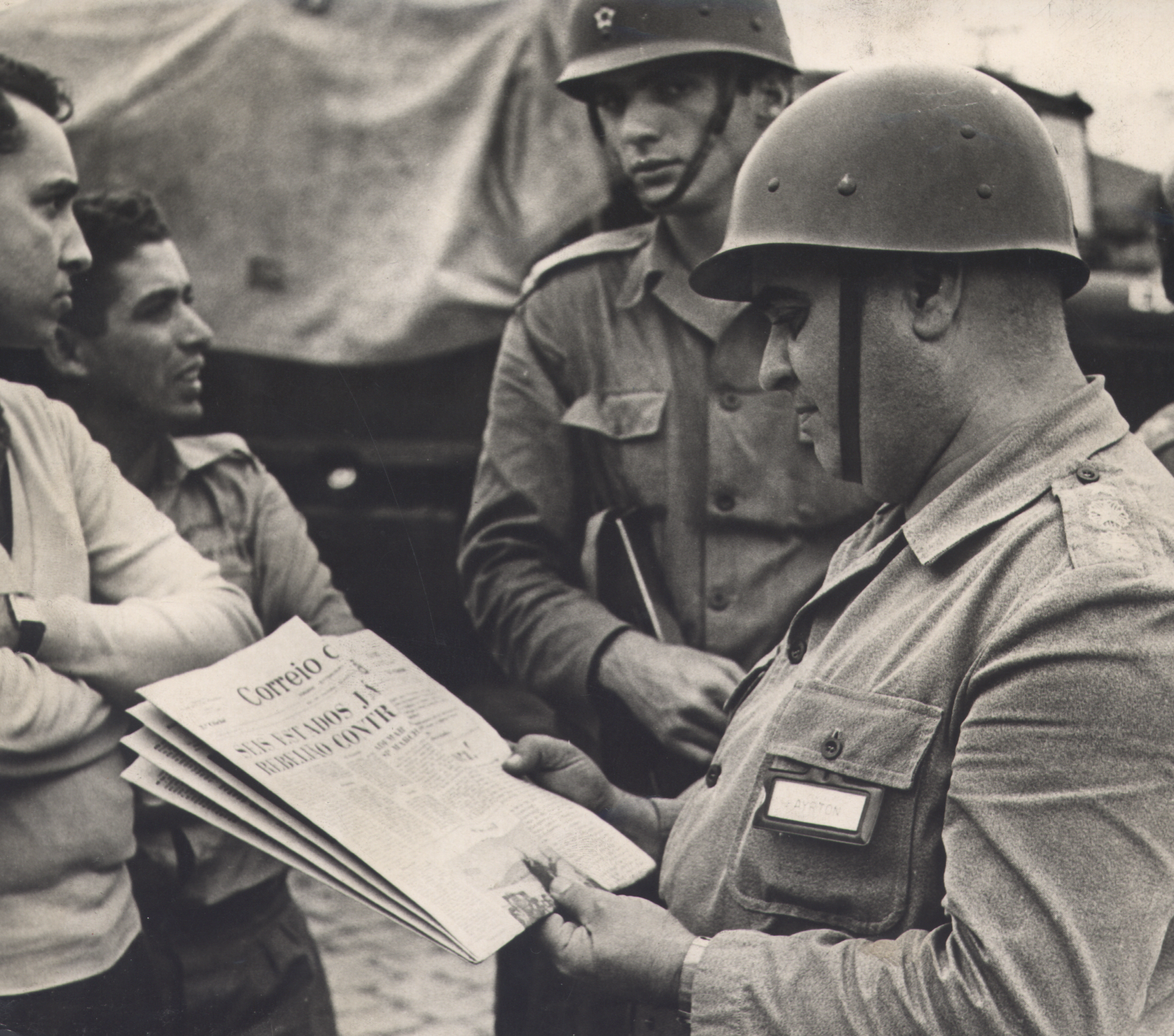
The 6th RI in Queluz

Zerbini managed to retain his troops in their quarters on the night of 31 March, but in the early hours of 1 April his authority dissolved. At 01:00 he tried to contact the 5th RI, only to discover that the barracks were empty and the men had left in trucks. He sent a motorized patrol in search of the regiment, but it never gave him any news. At 06:00 he heard from the commander of the 6th RI that he would advance to Resende under direct orders from Kruel. (Note: Motta 2003, book 14, p. 121 claims that the sixth regiment did not leave Caçapava. He also makes reference to a regiment that, instead of going to Rio de Janeiro, came to São Paulo, and later reversed its direction.) Between 6 and 7 o'clock, he communicated with Aluísio, who declared himself on the rebel side and moved through the valley with the 2nd Mechanized Reconnaissance Squadron. For Zerbini, the only thing left to do was delay the 2nd Army until the arrival of troops from Rio de Janeiro. He managed to accompany Aluísio to Resende, from where he intended to leave for Rio de Janeiro, but ended up being arrested at AMAN.

The 5th RI managed to travel in army trucks and three private buses, and the 6th, in private trucks and the Pássaro Marrom company's buses. The 1st Light Tank Battalion (BCCL) from Campinas continued to board trains, although, according to Colonel Cid de Camargo Osório, from the General Staff of the 2nd Army, its movement was delayed by the "internal enemy", which managed to cut off electricity supply. The transport situation was difficult, and they had to provide resources to personnel who were still on foot. Fuel along the way was guaranteed by governor Adhemar de Barros. Under his order, Postos Atlantic's petrol stations filled vehicle tanks "without bureaucracy; a 'note' was signed and that was it".

The movement of the 2nd 105 mm Howitzer Regiment (2nd RO 105), from Itu, is detailed in two testimonies from participating officers. (Note: Captain Luiz Gonzaga de Toledo Camargo and 1st lieutenant Geraldo Luiz Nery da Silva, both in História Oral do Exército.) Ready since Monday, the regiment anxiously awaited confirmation from Kruel until seeing him on television at dawn. At night, sub-lieutenant Rubens had tried to convince corporals and soldiers not to stand against the government and the "workers' movement", being workers themselves; he was personally arrested by the regiment's intelligence staff officer. (Note: Captain Luiz Gonzaga Camargo.) Lacking vehicles, the regiment received eight civilian ones. Colonel Benedicto Maia Pinto de Almeida was in command. The 1st Howitzer Battery of Captain Dario Scoralick went first, leaving for São Paulo at 07:30 with four of the civilian trucks. Two had ammunition and two had camping material, but were covered in tarpaulin inscribed the writing: "Ammunition - Danger", in a bluff to hide their lack of ammunition. On the way, it was reached by two to three vehicles from the Regimental General Staff and a regimental health team. In Jundiaí, they feared a reaction from the commanders of the Divisional Artillery and the 2nd 155 mm Howitzer Group (2nd GO 155), whose base was well positioned to block the road. Colonel Benedicto made a phone call to trusted officers there (Note: Major Manoel Augusto Teixeira and captains Jayme Britto Júnior and Della Nina, among others.) and they kept the two commanders in the artillery barracks, in the center, far from the city, where they did not interfere with the route. From São Paulo, they continued to the entrance to Via Dutra waiting for the 4th RI, which, however, was not there. (Note: According to Silva 2014 p. 359, this regiment was part of the 2nd Army's reserve and not of the forces that would immediately proceed to Rio de Janeiro.) Itu's artillery continued ahead.

=== AMAN's decision ===
The Military Academy of Agulhas Negras (AMAN), in Resende, was halfway along the road where then 2nd Army and GUEs converged. Thus, its commander, Brigade General Emílio Garrastazu Médici, was forced to choose a side. The strategic location of the academy was no coincidence, having been chosen based on geopolitical criteria. According to then Colonel Antônio Jorge Côrrea, deputy commander of the academy, inaction would have meant watching with "arms crossed, like eunuchs", as the 1st and 2nd Army fought in Resende, threatening life in the Academic City. Médici chose the 2nd Army. He had been in contact with Kruel and Mourão Filho since 1963, agreeing with the uprising as soon as he heard about it on 31 March. However, until then he had not participated in the conspiracy against Goulart. Therefore, his choice to side with Kruel and Mourão Filho's cause may have been a way to gain prestige with the coup's leadership. But on an ideological and psychological level, the decision was not sudden, as anti-communism, which targeted Goulart among right-wing officers, had been cultivated at the academy for years.

At 17:30 on 31 March, under orders from the 1st Army, the Command and Services Battalion (BCSv) was already on standby. It was a large unit, although it only consisted of a Company of Guards and support elements. The Operational General Staff was activated, drawing up plans to occupy the city and requisition supplies; by evening the manifesto was ready. At 20:30 the cadets were informed of the rebellion taking place in Minas Gerais. (Note: Motta 2003, p. 127-128, book 15 places this event at 22:00, after the wedding of an officer with the daughter of Colonel Junqueira, professor of topography.) At 02:00, Artur da Costa e Silva, the "revolutionary" leader in Guanabara and a friend of Médici, called to request his support, which was promised. Then, at 02:30, Kruel called and received a guarantee of free passage through the Paraíba Valley. Âncora called at 03:00 and informed that the GUEs was on its way and would pass through Resende at noon. Ten minutes later, Médici informed his officers that he would use the cadets in his operation. The decision was to participate in the "revolutionary movement" defending Via Dutra in the stretch between Itatiaia and Barra Mansa.

In the morning, the manifestos "Brothers in Arms", addressed to the entire country but especially to the 1st Army, and "Brothers of the Armed Forces", to the Naval Academy and the Aeronautics School, were issued by all available means. Elio Gaspari described the manifesto as "poetic in vein" and cautious, being "capable of surviving an agreement". The news of AMAN's defection to the coup raised the morale of the rebels throughout the country.

There was dissent within the academy, leading to the arrest of sergeants, cadets, and officers. Major Ernani Jorge Côrrea, commander of the Cavalry Course, mentioned the arrest of three lieutenants, noting that disagreements were few. Captain Geise Ferrari, commander of the Infantry Course, stated that he did not find any dropout among officers or cadets, but a cadet and a sergeant were preventively arrested. It was also necessary to deny the sergeants access to ammunition stocks, as it was feared that they could be government supporters. Captain Dickens Ferraz, the artillery instructor, stated that together with other officers, he had so much enthusiasm that, if Médici had not made up his mind, they would have crossed the Itatiaia mountain range to join the Minas Gerais rebels.

According to the plan, the city was occupied, including the City Hall; Mayor Augusto presented himself to be arrested and Médici refused his surrender. However, he was later detained. Teachers took over the press. Fuel stations were closed and fuel was only distributed with military authorization.

The closest 1st Army formation was the 1st Armored Infantry Battalion (1st BIB), from Barra Mansa. Its commander, Colonel Nilo de Queirós Lima, sided with Médici. (Note: Lemos, Renato (2001). "SILVA, Costa e". Dicionário Histórico-Biográfico Brasileiro. CPDOC FGV. "While the military situation was not defined in Rio, Costa e Silva transferred his headquarters from the headquarters of the former Ministry of War to a private residence in Botafogo. From there he communicated by telephone with general Emílio Garrastazu Médici, commander of the Military Academy of Agulhas Negras, informing him that general Amaury Kruel's troops, commander of the 2nd Army, who had joined the movement, would pass through there. Médici replied that the academy was ready to march alongside the rebels and that he had already obtained the support of the Armored Infantry Battalion, based in Barra Mansa".) The 1st BIB operated with a "very reduced structure", but had armored vehicles. It did not participate in the front line, remaining in Volta Redonda. Major Corrêa, who was one of the academy's troop commanders, and Captain Walter Kluge Guimarães, one of his subordinates, attested that they expected to find the 1st BIB defending the road in Barra Mansa (according to Corrêa, this was what the academy's deputy commander reported), but were surprised by a call from the battalion commander, who said he was busy dealing with the unrest at the plant. According to Colonel Osório, from the General Staff of the 2nd Army, Kruel's proposed plan was to mount a defense with the 5th and 6th RIs, the 1st BIB and the BCSv, but Médici refused, as he wanted to place the Cadet Corps on the frontline. Médici's refusal to replace the cadets is reiterated by the writer Eurilo Duarte.

== Meeting of the armies ==
=== Cadets in Via Dutra ===
The 2nd Army had not arrived: its most forward forces only crossed the border later on 1 April. As the 1st BIB was in Volta Redonda, the only obstacle on the highway to the passage of the loyalist forces were the cadets themselves. Their participation on the frontline may be surprising in two ways: the use of cadets in combat has a bad record in other countries, and the move of the Military School of Realengo to Resende had been done to keep students away from politics, which had led to the spread of tenentism and then communism.

Initially, from 06:00 to 08:30, a vanguard made up of a cavalry squadron and engineers left to take a defensive position on the heights that dominate Ribeirão da Divisa. Colonel Potyguara, commander of the Cadets Corps, remained at an outpost. At 09:30, the bulk of the cadets left in the following positions:

- At kilometer 277, the motorized Cavalry Squadron, under Major Ernani Jorge Corrêa, in a delaying position. (Note: Guimarães 2006, pp. 6 and 7: "it was decided to install the cavalry cadets in an advanced defensive position, with the mission of delaying the opposing forces in the lines of heights that covered the installations of the Barbará Plant, manufacturing seamless cast iron pipes, from the south. The left limit of the position was based on the elevation close to the Camargo Corrêa firm's construction site and machinery warehouse and its right limit was at the beginning of the old Rio—São Paulo road that led to the Babicock steam boiler factory. In front of the position, over the Rio–São Paulo highway, stretched the transverse concrete bridge that led to the city of Barra Mansa".) With 70–80 men, they could block the road with heavy vehicles from a construction company. According to Captain Guimarães, only half a lane was blocked to allow civilian traffic, and some drivers, after dialogue, returned to the Viúva Graça belvedere and returned with information about the loyalists.
- At kilometer 278, an Engineering Platoon. They were ready to detonate the Guarita and RFFSA viaducts. The destruction of the viaducts would force the loyalists to cross the river before Barra Mansa and approach from the other side, where the roads were nothing more than trails. When retreating, the cavalry would be met at kilometer 283, close to the Cilbrás factory, of the White Martins company, and the viaduct over the railway, by a reinforced Infantry Company under Captain Geise Ferrari. Any other force that arrived would not be considered friendly. There were 250 men, all that the Infantry Course could muster, organized into "three platoons of riflemen, a platoon of 106 recoilless guns, a platoon of 4.2 mortars, a section of 81 mortars, a section of 60 mortars, a section of 75 mm recoilless guns, a section of 57 recoilless guns and a section of heavy machine guns". The soldiers prepared their gun emplacements perpendicular to the highway. The infantry was fully motorized. Its original position was further back, in Ribeirão da Divisa, and was only later moved further ahead.
- At kilometer 286 there was a 105mm Howitzer Battery under Captain Dickens Ferraz. They loaded the ammunition on vehicles from 18:00 on the 31 March and headed to the highway in the morning, in fragile vehicles from the Engineering Course. While the commander and his Reconnaissance Officer looked for a place to occupy, they adopted a waiting position, leaving their howitzers in a roadside firing position, to fire on a bump further ahead if the enemy came.

In addition to them, there were two teams from the Communications Course. Lieutenant Taveira spent the night setting up telephone lines to the positions. Captain Guimarães recalled that, from his cavalry position, communication with the rearguard was only made through emissaries on the road. At the artillery position, there was no radio. The Command and Services Battalion, with its Company of Guards, maintained fuel stocks along the highway.

=== Arrival at Resende/Barra Mansa ===
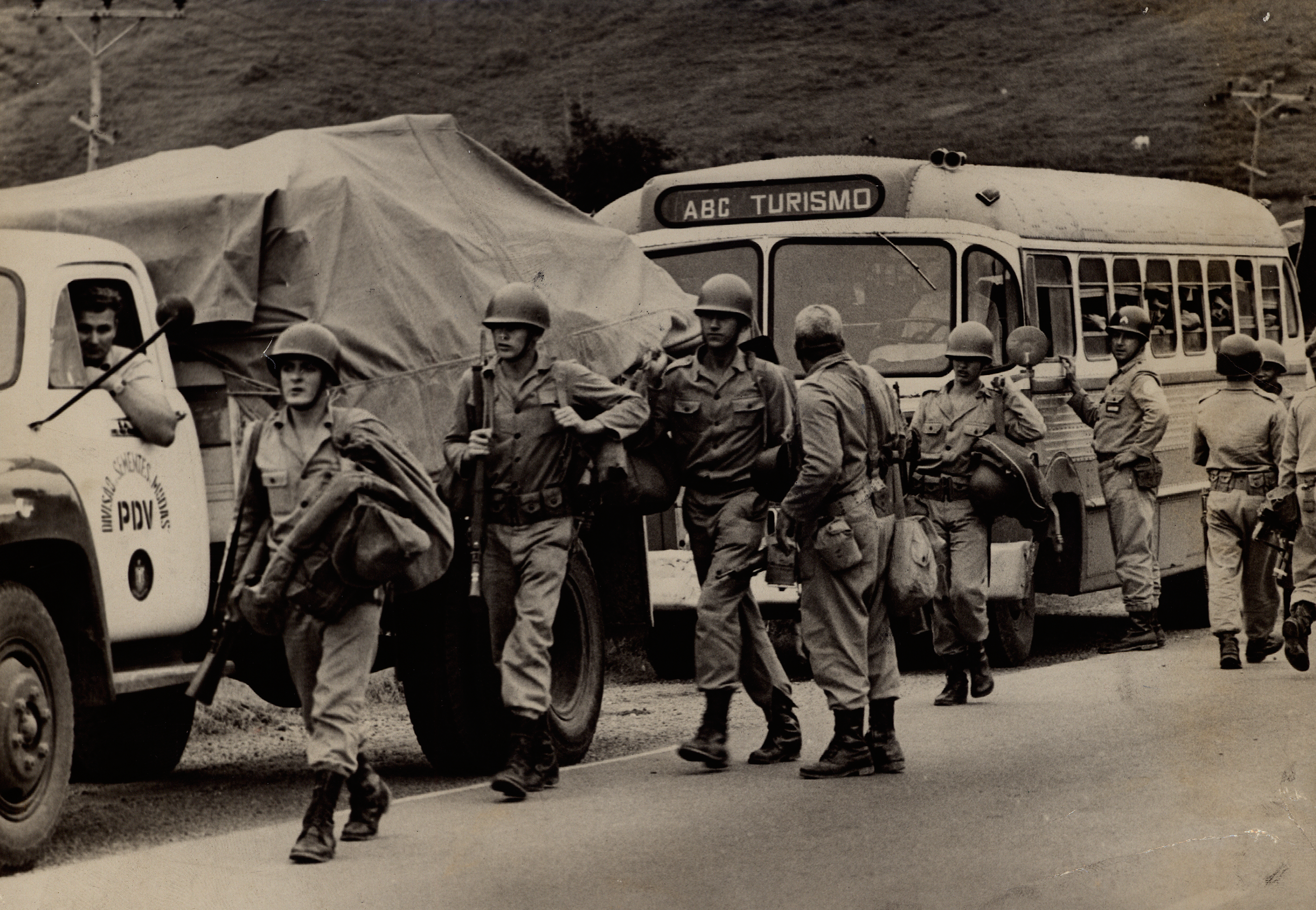
Soldiers in the road

The São Paulo troops had already arrived: at 11:30 the 5th RI approached Resende, staying in the east, at 12:30 the 2nd RO 105, CPOR/SP Battery and 1st Company of the BCCL arrived at AMAN and at 12:45 the 2nd Mechanized Reconnaissance Squadron to Itatiaia. According to Colonel Osório, General Aluísio was inefficient in using this squadron, holding it back instead of sending it forward as reconnaissance.

On the other side, the GUEs' vanguard arrived at the entrance to the city of Barra Mansa at 13:00, making contact with their opponents. It was made up of a reinforced battalion of the Infantry School-Regiment (REsI), with 800 men, a company of tanks and the 2nd Battery of the Artillery School Group (GEsA). The 2nd Battery occupied a firing position. The 1st and 3rd batteries arrived at 14:00. The logistical situation of the 2nd Battery was precarious, with little food. An academy patrol made first contact with the loyalists on an elevation after Barra Mansa.

The anti-aircraft component never arrived. It left at 09:00, but under orders from Captain Ustra, the movement was delayed: tires were deflated and vehicles broke down. At 20:00 it had not gone beyond Serra das Araras. A company from the Engineering School Battalion that accompanied the column also did not go beyond the Serra das Araras.

=== Climax ===
At noon, at kilometer 78, jeeps, water tankers, medical aid vehicles and REI trucks were on their way to concentrate their forces which, between kilometers 90 and 100, maintained a total of 100 vehicles along the road, with machine gun nests scattered across the nearby slopes. At the entrance to Barra Mansa, troops were spread out in the bush, on the side of the road.

— Correio da Manhã, 2 April 1964

The GUEs and the academy were no more than 5 or 30 km away. The terrain was the highway, with elevations making movement difficult on both sides. For the 2nd Army, "the prospect of a frontal clash with the Rio de Janeiro troops was terrible, and bloodshed was imagined". With the cadets on the road, however, it was kept further behind. The possibility of conflict would then be between the cadets and the troops coming from Guanabara. It would be disproportionate. The academy was outnumbered and outgunned — 800 REsI soldiers against 250 infantry and 70-80 cavalry cadets. The REsI was an elite troop, and the only infantry regiment with full personnel and the best equipment of the Brazil-United States Military Agreement.

Although the cadets are remembered as elite troops, those who passed or served at the academy emphasized their unpreparedness in testimonies. The difficult situation of the artillery is noted in the testimonies of Captain Ferraz and one of his subordinates, Lieutenant José Carlos Lisbôa da Cunha, an assistant on the fire line. Their battery had 250 shells, while the GEsA's 1st and 3rd combined had 35 thousand. The 3rd year cadets had barely begun artillery instruction and knew little about line of fire and shooting techniques. They were unaware of vertical fire, which was required by the rugged terrain and the position chosen for the howitzers. They received instructions in the field, but "anyone who knows shooting technique knows that you cannot improvise". There was still a lack of a topographic map and not even a single radio, with communication initially taking place through visual contact. Under these conditions, for the commander, "we would certainly be massacred, given the combat power of the troops in front of us". Despite recognizing the disproportion, Captain Ferrari opined that the advance of the GUEs would be difficult with the obstacles in the way and the destruction of the bridges would force it to reach the highway from the other side, where the roads were little better than trails, unfeasible for heavy vehicles. He praised the meticulousness of the cadets he commanded.

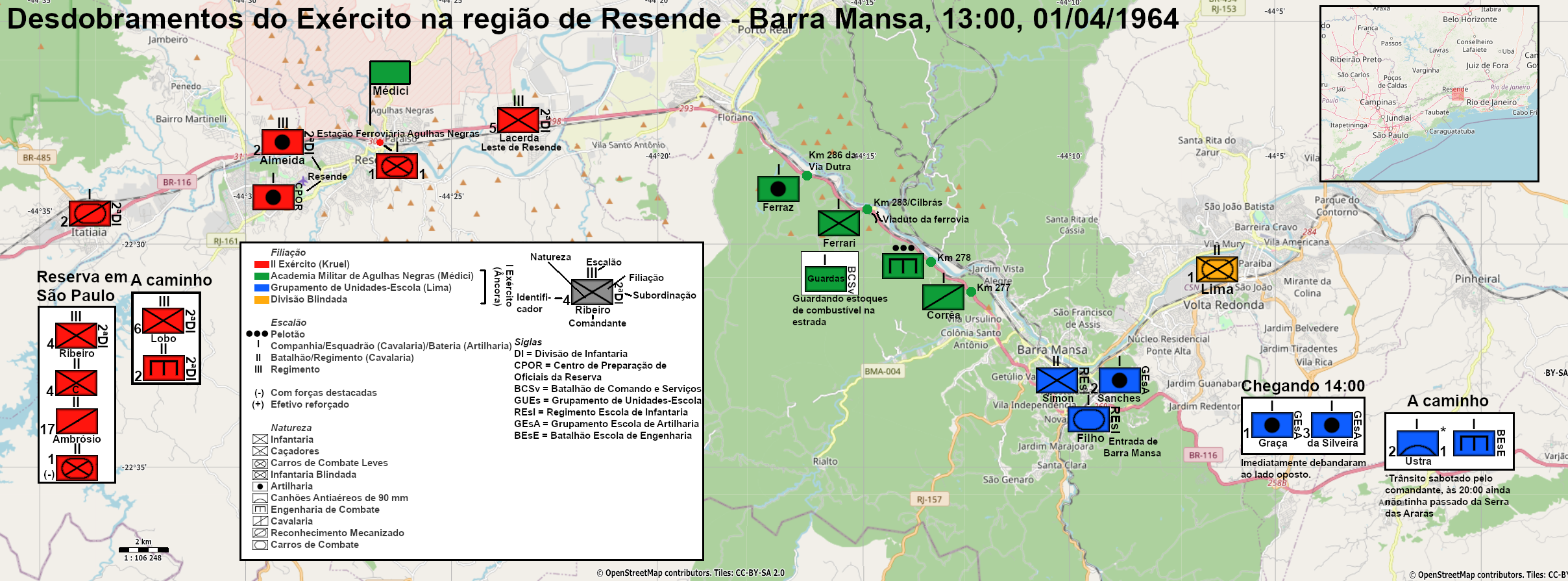
Positions of the 1st and 2nd Armies in their meeting

Médici's tactic, however, was psychological, using the cadets as a "psychological brake". This would have been precisely the reason why he insisted on having cadets, and not soldiers from São Paulo, on the front line. The "Brothers in Arms" manifesto made the following appeal: "Do not try to cut off so many vocations in the cradle". His logic was that the "School-Regiment's officers, knowing that they would face poorly-armed cadets, would have to wonder how to get over them. Many had children, brothers and relatives in AMAN. If they no longer had convincing arguments to support João Goulart's government, they'd be even less willing to shoot young men, almost children". The manifesto was even delivered to General Anfrísio.

The unwillingness to fight was seen in the two GEsA howitzer batteries that arrived at 14:00, the 1st and the 3rd. Instead of taking up firing positions, they proceeded at high speed along Via Dutra and joined the academy. After the cavalry passed, the infantry was unaware and there was almost friendly fire, but the confusion was soon resolved. The REsI's 4.2 Heavy Mortar Platoon refused the order to prepare to fire on the cadets.

In Queluz, Colonel Souza Lobo, commander of the 6th RI, spoke to journalists. The situation presented by Correio da Manhã was of a large additional number of 1st Army vehicles well before the Barra Mansa region, which the REsI, if it chose to defect, could resist in the mountains. There was no exchange of fire; at 15:00 a truce was reached, with both sides remaining in position, faced with a new reality: the arrival of General Âncora to negotiate with Kruel at the academy.

=== Defection of the loyalist batteries ===
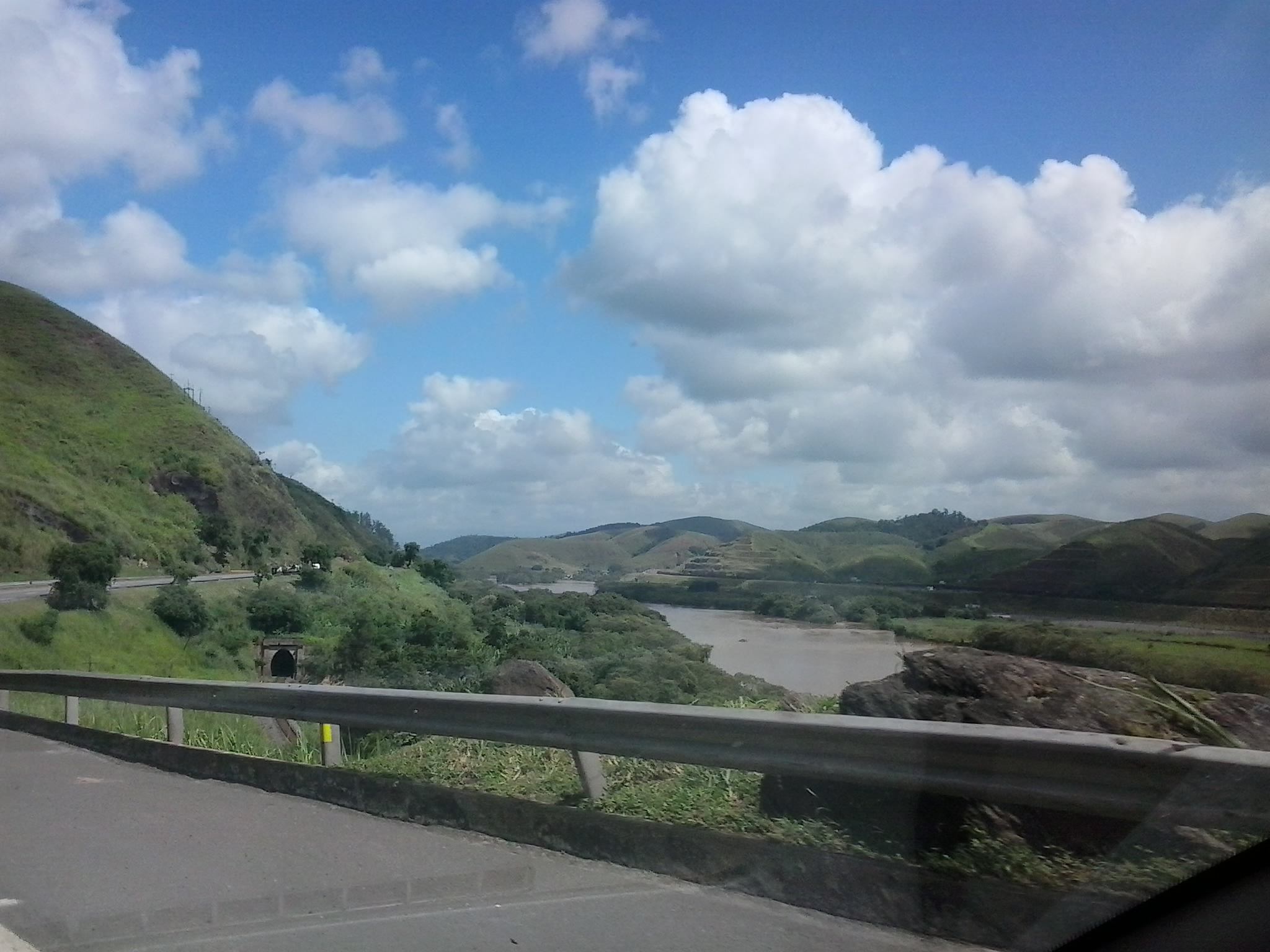
The Via Dutra in Barra Mansa

The defection of parts of the GEsA is detailed in testimonies from its participants, Captain Graça, commander of the 3rd Battery, and 2nd Lieutenant Oacyr Pizzotti Minervino, his deputy commander, in addition to 2nd Lieutenant Sanches, commander of the 2nd Battery and an eyewitness to what happened. The 1st Battery belonged to Captain Silveira. Captains Brunner, deputy commander of GEsA, and Seixas, from his General Staff, led the defection, which was already the intention when they left Guanabara. It broke with the authority of Colonel Aldo, commander of the GEsA.

Approaching the contact line, before the Dupont factory in Barra Mansa, GEsA stopped. Brunner asked, "Who is the enemy? Where does he come from?" Until then, they did not know. Along with his officers, Colonel Aldo ordered them to take a position and support the REsI against the academy. Until then, they were unaware of their opponent. Then the following dialogue took place between Seixas or Brunner and Colonel Aldo:

- Are you going to shoot cadets?
- We are soldiers and we receive orders. It's legal, the mission exists, and we must fulfill it. It is a bitter mission, but one that must be accomplished.

Seixas, Brunner, Graça and Silveira immediately decided on another course of action. The two captains formed their batteries into a group under the leadership of Seixas. Each captain informed his men that they would pass through REsI and meet the cadets, crossing to the other side. Captain Graça consulted 2nd Lieutenant Pizzotti regarding the loyalty of the officers — "I drag them". But as the sergeants were a risk, he ordered them to be kept without ammunition and information about their destination, telling them that it would be a reconnaissance task. "But it will be difficult to hide; reconnaissance with the entire force! People will be suspicious"; "It's your problem, get over it". In the seat of each vehicle, in addition to the driver and the sergeant, there was an officer. The sergeants, in fact, noticed an abnormality and Pizzotti, clarifying that it was "a different reconnaissance", insisted that they not question the order. Some ended up detained. They resisted due to legality and the government's ideological appeal, and with the exception of one, they would resume their functions upon return.

The movement would have to be quick, as it would cross the existing defensive line, with which there was no coordination and which, dominating the elevations, could target them in the back. The columns left as if to take up positions and hastily headed towards Resende. The Service Battery's ammunition vehicles followed, as their acting commander was also against the government. They crossed the REsI battalion and the 2nd Battery. The commander of the former stopped his jeep next to the latter and noted: "they crossed over to the other side..." and did nothing more than that: there was no problem on the part of the REsI, which was there unwillingly. Lieutenant Sanches ordered the telephone line to be cut to silence Colonel Aldo, who was approaching. The latter, from the road curb, noticed the desertion of most of his group, and "in tears", exclaimed: "Traitors! Traitors!". He threatened to commit suicide, but the REsI battalion's major held his hand.

Captain Graça went ahead in a jeep to warn the cadets that the group was passing alongside them and they should not be scared. They were welcomed by the cavalry and moved on.

The cavalry did not inform the infantry, who were moving to a position further ahead. As they crossed a curve, they saw an unknown force meeting them in the distance — 2.5-ton trucks pulling howitzers from the batteries. They immediately blocked the road with their vehicles and took up positions on the slopes. Through binoculars, Captain Ferrari saw Captain Adir, from the academy, in the first jeep, concluding that it was a deforce that had defected. With orders not to fire, the academy infantry blocked the batteries, and there was a gathering. The academy's artillery was also unaware of the defection. From above, they saw the GEsA trucks and knew they were from the other side, as the academy did not have those trucks. For a few tense moments they thought about opening fire, but then they saw soldiers standing next to the vehicles' passenger compartment, waving white shirts. As they approached, they saw the commander and lieutenants who had the sergeants at gunpoint. The GEsA batteries arrived at the academy, encountering 2nd Army artillery units.

== Âncora–Kruel conference ==
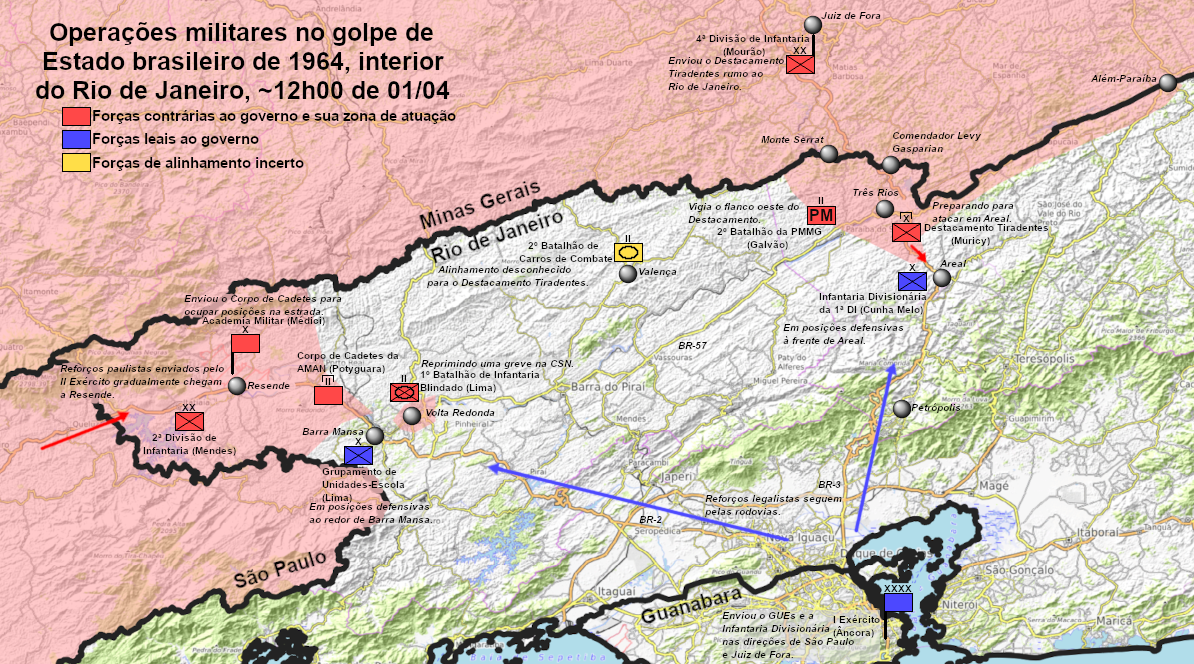
Military situation in Rio de Janeiro's countryside around noon, when Goulart left Guanabara

After Goulart's departure from Rio de Janeiro, Âncora's authority at the head of the 1st Army (and, on an interim basis, the Ministry of War) began to deteriorate. Goulart instructed him to negotiate with Kruel, in a last-ditch effort to make Kruel back down. When Âncora called the presidential palace for further clarification, the president had already left and the person who responded was the head of the Military Cabinet, General Assis Brasil; without assuming to speak on behalf of the president, Assis Brasil stated that Goulart had orderem them not to cause a military conflict. Thus, according to Thomas Skidmore, the time had come to stop resistance.

In the early afternoon (Note: Faria 2013, p. 432 mentions 13:30, and Gaspari 2014a, 14:30.) Âncora received a call from Costa e Silva, who asked him to join the coup, but he refused. "Âncora, you must imagine that this situation you are in, this movement you are noticing, did not sprout from the ground like nutsedge, which takes nothing to sprout". He recognized that his cause was lost and proposed negotiation with Kruel. Costa e Silva accepted and mediated the parties. At Kruel's request, the location was AMAN, in the territory already controlled by the 2nd Army. By car, Âncora arrived at 17:00 or in the middle of the afternoon "in a deplorable state, suffering from an asthma attack". Médici received him with buglers and all the honors due to his position. Âncora was reluctanct, defining himself as a losing commander, and hearing in response that "there are no losers but the enemies of the Fatherland". While waiting for Kruel, he spoke with General Aluísio Mendes and heard erroneous news on the radio that Goulart had resigned. Zerbini, who was also at AMAN, asked Âncora for a command in Rio de Janeiro in order to continue the loyalist cause, hearing in response "that the government was leaderless and that the president was no longer in Rio de Janeiro and was no longer president".

Kruel's car broke down on the way and he was late. He arrived at 17:40, with the meeting taking place at 18:00. It did not have the "humiliating formality of a surrender", but it was not very friendly; Kruel reportedly said: "You just came to say good night! You're no longer a minister and don't think about resisting!" While Âncora was away, Costa e Silva took over the Ministry of War at 17:00. Âncora originally went to Resende wanting to negotiate, but successive defections of his forces to the opponent led to his military defeat. For him, his mission was over. The 1st Army surrendered, and Costa e Silva's position was recognized — it was in Kruel's interest to deny the position to his rival, General Castelo Branco. Any possibility of resistance in Rio de Janeiro ended, although the loyalists still had power in Rio Grande do Sul. (Note: See Revolutionary 3rd Army for the situation.) "Âncora returns alone and will leave history".

== Aftermath ==
The operations came to an end, soldiers returned to their barracks and the rebellion triumphed. Médici's decision entered positively into military memory, and the historical narrative constructed around it was "almost mythological". His decision to defend the Via Dutra with his cadets is considered to be responsible for preventing the loyalist advance, and ultimately, ending Âncora's resistance to the coup. There is, however, another way of understanding what happened: Âncora was under pressure from Costa e Silva, who suggested surrender, and it was Âncora himself who proposed a meeting with Kruel. Elio Gaspari contextualized the surrender in the dissolution of the "military apparatus" in the 1st Army after Goulart left Rio de Janeiro.

Upon returning to the academy, the following day, the cadets with dirty and even torn uniforms were received by military personnel from the academy and from São Paulo and civilians from Resende, showing the support of part of the local population for Médici's position. The BCSv was not yet completely demobilized. The academy supported the activities of the 1st BIB in Volta Redonda and Barra Mansa and received prisoners sent from there.

== Strike at Companhia Siderúrgica Nacional ==
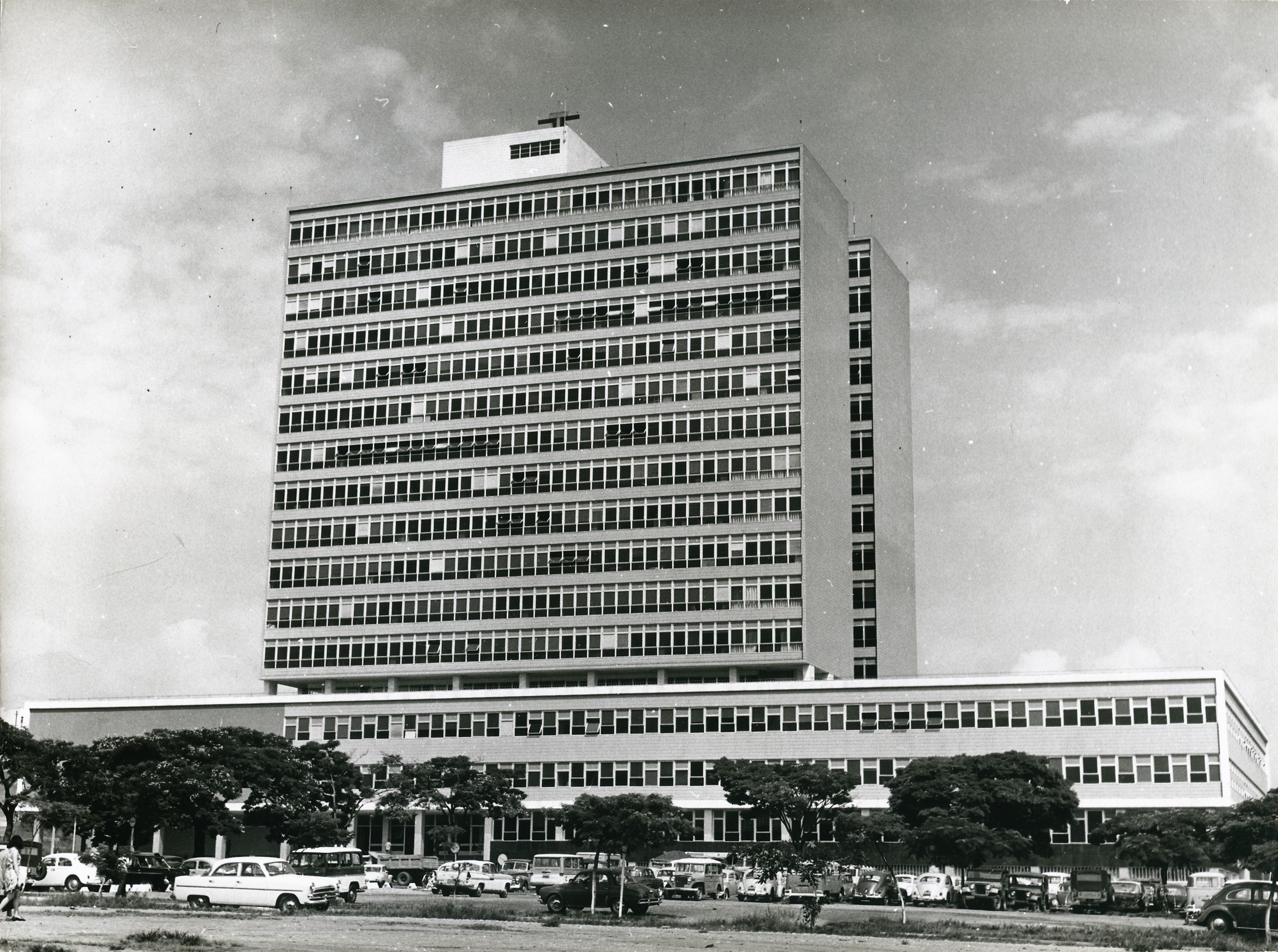
CSN's central office

The steel hub in Volta Redonda, the Companhia Siderúrgica Nacional (CSN), was a military-technocratic project from the Estado Novo era, a pillar of the Brazil's security and development strategy and still strongly associated with the military. The company's president, admiral Lúcio Meira, was a government supporter, but the board was divided, with a faction opposing him. CSN's industrial directorate had a Company Security Plan, a "secret police" and proximity to the 1st Armored Infantry Battalion. With two companies, the 1st BIB had been working to disperse labor unrest in the region since the 1950s.

Volta Redonda was of great importance for the Brazil's left, having been visited by Luís Carlos Prestes, Leonel Brizola, Maurício Grabois and Wladimir Pomar. The large number of workers supported an organized labor movement disputed between laborists and communists. In the 1950s, both had agreed to spare CSN from strikes due to its importance for Brazil's sovereignty, but under the leadership of communist João Alves dos Santos Lima Neto (1963-1964) a threat of strike at the company had been made for the first time.

Once the coup began, the Metalworkers Union prepared to react. Faced with imminent disturbances, industrial director Mauro Mariano activated the pre-existing plan, which aimed to keep the plant running and neutralize the strike. He put management on alert and mobilized supervisors, who occupied their positions until 06:00 on 1 April. The civil-military command proved to be well articulated. The union's telephones were blocked, and CSN's mutual traffic with the Companhia Telefônica Brasileira was controlled, prohibiting any call without the approval of the industrial director, in order to restrict the possibility of coordination between the union and the Plant Departments.

A labor group led by Othon Reis Fernandes occupied Rádio Siderúrgica, on Laranjal hill, and put it live at around 06:30. It was then closed by the intervention of the 1st BIB, which parked an armored vehicle in front of the radio station, but returned to air at 09:00 on orders from Lúcio Meira. Integrated into the pro-government "Legality Chain", it broadcast messages in favor of the president until 16:20, when it began to obey the orders of the Industrial Director.

Workers who showed up in the morning found the entrance at the upper passage guarded by the army, and pickets set up to prevent their entry. The crowd was dispersed at 07:00, and most ended up entering. Union activists led by Lima Neto managed to enter, but the strike inside was only partial. The leaders were arrested, (such as Lima Neto, who, arriving at 07:30, was already arrested at 10:00) to dismantle the strike and intimidate the union, but the news ended up encouraging workers to join the strike.

At the union headquarters, the possibility of dynamiting the Central do Brasil rail lines to prevent the passage of troops was considered, but the unionists chose to wait for events. After 9–11:00 they found that Lima Neto was arrested and the 1st BIB was in Arrozal, on Via Dutra. After 17:15, people leaving work gathered in front of the headquarters, where a crowd formed a cordon. Around dusk, the 1st BIB took positions on Amaral Peixoto, 200 meters away, with at least one armored car. They invaded the headquarters, dispersed the crowd and took all documents. A large number of trade unionists were ultimately imprisoned in the 1st BIB and AMAN.

Within a week, all union leaders were arrested. The unsuccessful mobilization of the trade union movement and communists showed disorganization, and after the coup the number of communists identified was not large, which also reveals a limited reach among the popular classes. Repressive action since the 1950s and the influence of the military on the daily lives of the population may have reduced the spread of communist ideas in the region.
