= Amaury Kruel =

Brazilian military officer and politician

Marshal Amaury Kruel
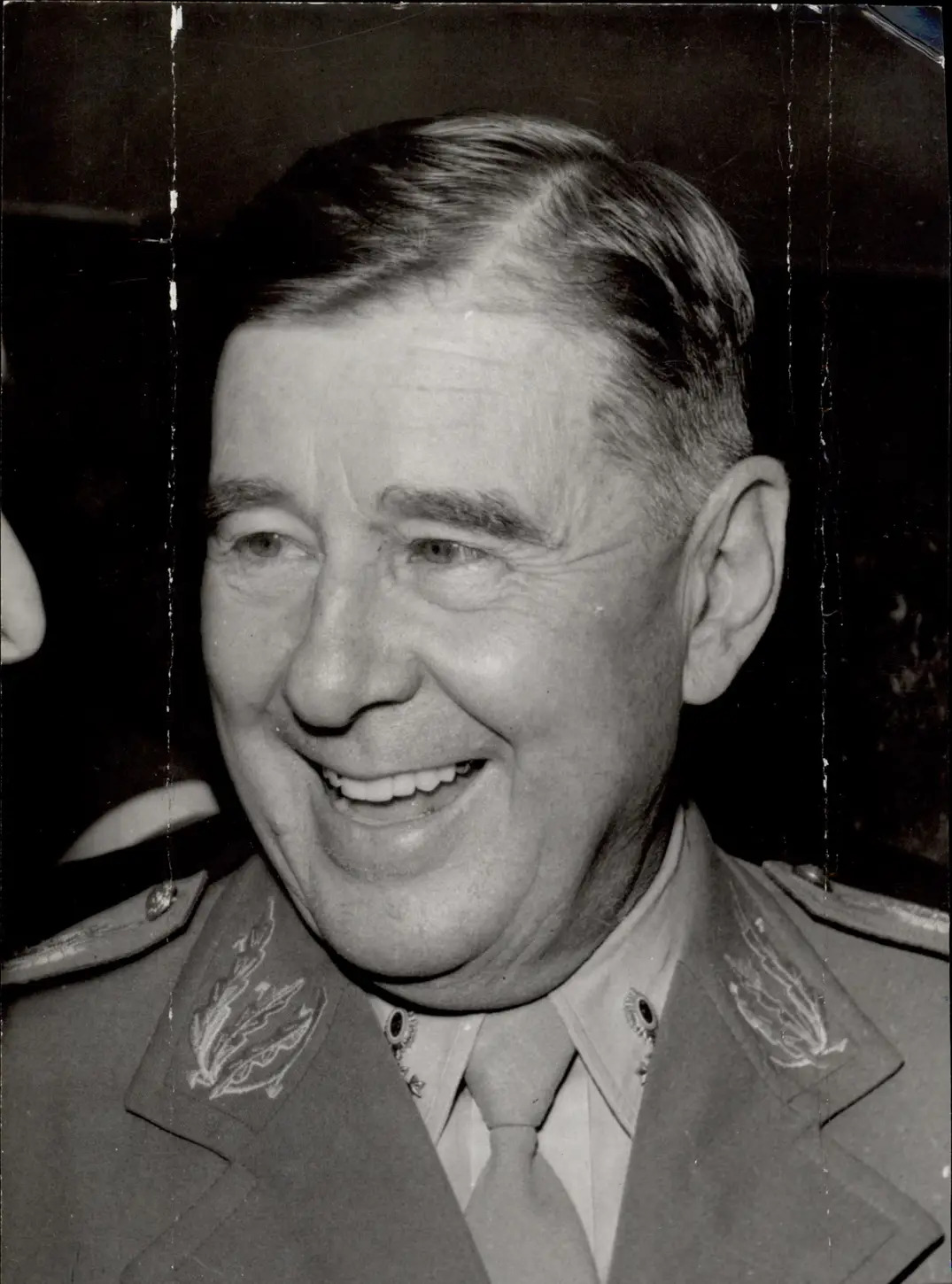
- Kruel in 1964

Minister of War
- In office 14 September 1962 – 15 June 1963
- President: João Goulart
- Preceded by: Nélson de Melo
- Succeeded by: Jair Dantas Ribeiro

Head of the Military Cabinet
- In office 12 July 1962 – 18 September 1962
- President: João Goulart
- Preceded by: Aurélio de Lira Tavares
- Succeeded by: Albino Silva
- In office 9 September 1961 – 19 September 1961
- President: João Goulart
- Preceded by: Ernesto Geisel
- Succeeded by: Aurélio de Lira Tavares

Member of the Chamber of Deputies
- In office 12 September 1967 – 1 February 1971
- Constituency: Guanabara

Personal details
- Born: 11 April 1901 Santa Maria, Rio Grande do Sul, Brazil
- Died: 23 August 1996 (aged 95) Rio de Janeiro, Rio de Janeiro, Brazil
- Party: MDB
- Spouse(s): Cândida Cezimbra Kruel; Maria Helena Kruel
- Education: Military School of Porto Alegre; Military School of Realengo; Army General Staff School
- Occupation: Military officer; politician

Military service
- Allegiance: Brazil
- Branch/service: Brazilian Army
- Years of service: 1916–1966
- Rank: Marshal
- Commands: List: Mechanized Reconnaissance Regiment; 1st Mechanized Reconnaissance Regiment; 1st Guard Cavalry Regiment; 1st Cavalry Division; Divisional Artillery of the 1st Infantry Division; Divisional Infantry of the 1st Infantry Division; Armored Division Core; Armored Division; Southeastern Military Command
- Battles/wars: Revolution of 1930; World War II; Italian campaign; 1964 Brazilian coup d'état
- Awards: Military Order of Aviz (Grand Cross)

Amaury Kruel (11 April 1901 – 23 August 1996) was a Brazilian military officer and politician who served as officer of the General Staff of the Brazilian Expeditionary Force (FEB) in 1944–1945, head of the Federal Office of Public Security (DFSP) in 1957–1959 and Minister of War in 1962–1963. Despite initially supporting president João Goulart, Kruel later switched sides and was one of the main participants in the 1964 coup d'état at the head of the 2nd Army, from 1963 to 1966. He reached the rank of army general, being promoted to marshal when he retired. He was then a federal deputy for Guanabara from 1967 to 1971.

A friend of Humberto de Alencar Castelo Branco since he was a teenager at the Military School of Porto Alegre, he participated in the Revolution of 1930 and fought in the FEB as head of the 2nd Section (information) of its General Staff. He broke his friendship with Castelo Branco (also an officer of the General Staff) at the end of 1944 due to disagreements in the Battle of Monte Castello. In the early 1950s, he supported the right in the political dispute at the Military Club and in 1954 he contributed to the downfall of João Goulart, then Minister of Labor under Getúlio Vargas, but in the following year they became personal friends. From 1957 to 1959, he was put in charge of the police forces in the capital (Rio de Janeiro) through the DFSP by president Juscelino Kubitschek. His anti-crime measures led to the first iteration of what would be called the "Death Squad". He had some diplomatic assignments in his career, almost being an ambassador in 1961. Kruel also owned land and worked in the business sector.

In 1961, he supported Goulart's inauguration as president of Brazil in the Legality Campaign. Until 1963, as head of the Military Cabinet and the Ministry of War, he was the president's strong man in the Brazilian Army, setting up a military apparatus to prevent a coup and apply political pressure. He was a right-wing figure in the government and conflicts with the left led to his fall from office. In his next command, the 2nd Army, responsible for São Paulo and Mato Grosso, Kruel was already in contact with the conspirators against the president. Even so, after the outbreak of the coup in 1964, he offered his support to Goulart if the president broke with the left. With the refusal, Kruel sent troops to Brasília, Paraná and the Paraíba Valley. His conference with general Armando de Moraes Ancora in Resende marked the end of loyalist resistance in the 1st Army.

After the coup, Kruel was a pre-candidate in the indirect election won by Castelo Branco, representing a tendency towards the center, associated with the deposed government. He was responsible for political repression under his authority during the military dictatorship. He participated in the conspiracy of São Paulo governor Ademar de Barros with various disgruntled sectors, including the Communist Party, for a "countercoup" against Castelo Branco, but it was unsuccessful. Ademar was removed without resisting in 1966 and Kruel went into reserve when the government wanted to transfer him from command. In his last years in public life he was an opposition federal deputy.

== Family and possessions ==
A descendant of German immigrants, (Note: See also Nicoloso, Fabricio Rigo (2013). Fazer-se elite em Santa Maria - RS: os imigrantes alemães entre estratégias políticas e sociais - 1830/1891 (PDF) (Thesis). Santa Maria: UFSM.) Kruel was the son of farmer José Carlos Kruel and Ana Weber Kruel. His brother Riograndino (1898–1989) and nephew Vinícius were also generals. Riograndino Kruel led the tenentist revolt in the 10th Independent Cavalry Regiment in Bela Vista, present-day Mato Grosso do Sul, at the time of the São Paulo Revolt of 1924, ending his career heading the Federal Police Department in 1964–1966. Vinícius Kruel was a major in 1964, serving at the 2nd Army HQ, and a brigadier general in 1981, when he accepted to lead the investigation into the Riocentro bombing on the condition that he would not accept pressure. The investigation did not stay with him and his career ended in that rank.

Amaury Kruel married Cândida Cezimbra Kruel, with whom he had a son (Nei Kruel); he later married Maria Helena Kruel. When Jango (João Goulart) was president, he got a job at Lloyd Brasileiro in New Orleans for Kruel's son. According to statements by Ernesto Geisel and general Rubens Restell to journalist Elio Gaspari, Jango also managed to obtain public funding for a coffee farm in Espírito Santo. Kruel owned the Piraquê farm in Linhares, on the banks of the Doce River, where he planted cacao. In 2014, his heirs compensated a worker held in conditions analogous to slavery on the farm from 1949 to 1963, when the lawsuit was filed. The lawsuit dragged on for 50 years. (Note: Gaspari 2014 does not clarify whether the coffee farm was Piraquê, but the worker's lawsuit refers to conditions that began years before the Goulart government.) Kruel would also have two farms in Bahia. He worked in the business sector, as part of the company Eletrônica Kruel S.A.

== Career ==
=== 1910s–1930s ===
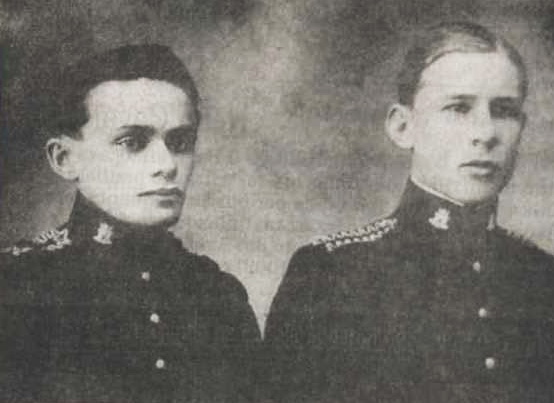
Castelo Branco and Kruel at the Military School of Porto Alegre, c. 1912–1917

Kruel studied at the Military School of Porto Alegre beginning when he was around 11–12 years old. Amaury and Riograndino were among Humberto Castelo Branco's best friends at the school, where they also met Artur da Costa e Silva. Castelo and the Kruel brothers were on the board of the Sociedade Cívica Literária, a student association that promoted soirées and a moralizing political tendency, contrary to the corrupt practices associated with the Borges de Medeiros government. On breaks, Amaury and Castelo attended the Legislative Assembly of Rio Grande do Sul, where they booed government supporters and applauded the opposition. In the streets, they joined the protests of workers and students, in one of which Kruel was shot in the leg by the Military Brigade, leaving a scar for the rest of his life.

Both went on to the Military School of Realengo, in Rio de Janeiro, in 1918, and Kruel remained Castelo's best friend. They were in the same class as other officers of great relevance in Brazil in the following decades, such as Olímpio Mourão Filho. Cadet Kruel joined the cavalry branch, ranking 18th among his peers. He left as an officer candidate in 1921.

In 1923, when he was first lieutenant in the 7th Cavalry Regiment, in Santana do Livramento, he participated with other soldiers in demonstrations in support of the Federalist Revolution, condemning the fifth consecutive re-election of Borges de Medeiros. During the Revolution of 1930 he was still a lieutenant, serving as aide-de-camp to the deputy chief of staff of the General Staff of the Army in Rio de Janeiro. In this position, he participated in the coup that brought Getúlio Vargas to power. He later joined the Clube 3 de Outubro, an organization of tenentists who defended the reforms instituted by the revolution. In 1931–1933 Kruel attended the General Staff School. In 1936–1937, already as a major, he commanded the Municipal Police of Rio de Janeiro.

=== Second World War ===
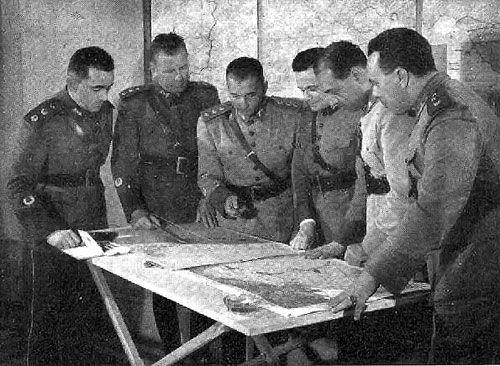
General Staff of the FEB. Kruel is second from right to left, between Brayner (on the right) and Castelo Branco (on the left)

Brazil entered World War II in 1942 and began preparing the Brazilian Expeditionary Force. Kruel was one of eleven Brazilian officers sent in 1943 to a three-month internship at Fort Leavenworth, in the United States. While abroad, he was promoted to lieutenant colonel. Brazilians learned to replace French doctrine with American maneuver warfare, and Kruel also participated in debates with American agents on police reform.

General Mascarenhas de Morais, commander of the 1st Expeditionary Infantry Division (1st DIE), designated the members of his General Staff (EM) to participate in the Italian campaign: Aguinaldo José Sena Campos to the 1st Section (personnel), Kruel to the 2nd (information), Castelo Branco in the 3rd (operations) and Thales Ribeiro da Costa in the 4th (logistics). The head of EM was colonel Floriano de Lima Brayner. Landing in Italy in 1944, Kruel took part in the offensive against the Gothic Line. The first attacks at the Battle of Monte Castello, from November to December, were costly defeats. The operation, planned by Castelo, had previously been criticized by Brayner and Kruel. Based on testimonies by German prisoners, the Information Section had warned about enemy fortifications, but Castelo managed to convince Mascarenhas to proceed. The plan used an estimate of the enemy reaction made by the Operations Section, not the Intelligence Section; Kruel attacked Castelo for going beyond his attributions, and Castelo responded that Kruel had failed to make the estimate.

The war ended his thirty-year friendship with Castelo. Kruel was further offended when the Operations Section overstepped his authority to send a telegram to Brazil, lying about tranquility at the front. Much to his frustration, Castelo became Mascarenhas' right-hand man. According to Flávio Tavares, Kruel was also offended when Castelo associated him with the enemy for descending from German immigrants. Lira Neto cited such association as made privately between Castelo and Mascarenhas. (Note: Neto 2004. Castelo's mockery, discrediting Kruel's arguments, was: "general, I've known Kruel since I was a boy. No wonder his nickname in the Military School: "German". In the Kruel family, at home, everyone spoke the same language as Hitler. Even their dog was a Germanophile. They raised a German Shepherd...") With the end of the campaign in 1945, Kruel was praised by Mascarenhas de Morais and decorated by Mark W. Clark, commander of the American 5th Army.

=== 1940s–1950s ===
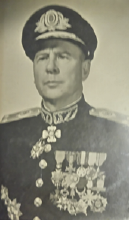
Kruel as commander of AD/1

After the war, Kruel served as a military attaché in London until his promotion to colonel in 1947. The position of attaché was a prestigious one and offered a more cosmopolitan life, isolated from barracks and bureaucracy. In diplomacy, Kruel was also Brazil's military advisor at the United Nations in 1960. In 1958 he was awarded the Grand Cross of the Military Order of Aviz of Portugal.

In January 1949 he was responsible for the 2nd Section of the 1st Deputy Chief of Staff of the Army, when he took a special information course and was in charge of an inquiry into communist activities in the Brazilian Army. Nelson Werneck Sodré accused Kruel to be one of the officers who abused their positions in the election of the Military Club's directorate in 1952, persecuting supporters of the Yellow ticket. Kruel supported the Blue ticket, from the military right (the "Democratic Crusade"), against the self-styled "nationalists". In July one of the prosecutors, Amador Cisneiros de Amaral, protested that prisoners were being held into solitary confinement for longer than the legal maximum period of three days. Kruel called Amaral a communist and ordered his arrest, a decision reversed by judge Adalberto Barreto. Some of the prisoners were FEB veterans, and their prestige could have strengthened the "nationalist" side. Many of the officers were acquitted in July, but their careers were ruined and the internationalists of the "Democratic Crusade" gained dominance of the army.

In February 1954, when commanding the 1st Guard Cavalry Regiment (Independence Dragoons) in Rio de Janeiro, Kruel was the first of 82 signatories of the "Manifesto dos Coronéis" and was responsible for delivering it to the Minister of War. The document criticized the administration of Getúlio Vargas, the lack of resources for the army, the living conditions in which the soldiers were left in, and the 100% increase in the minimum wage proposed by Minister of Labor João Goulart. The minister fell. However, shortly afterwards Kruel and Goulart became friends in São Borja, Rio Grande do Sul. Kruel had become the youngest brigadier general in March, commanding the Divisional Artillery of the 1st DI, (Note: From 28 April to 25 September. See "Galeria de Antigos Comandantes da AD/1". Site da AD/1. Archived from the original on 12 December 2018.) the 1st Cavalry Division and, after July 1955, the Chief of Staff of the Southern Military Zone. It was during this period that he met Goulart. In October, the person responsible for forging the "Brandi letter", with which journalist Carlos Lacerda accused Goulart of smuggling weapons, confessed his responsibility to Kruel in Rio Grande do Sul. The general was godfather to João Vicente, the son of Goulart born in 1956.

=== Public security (1957–1959) ===
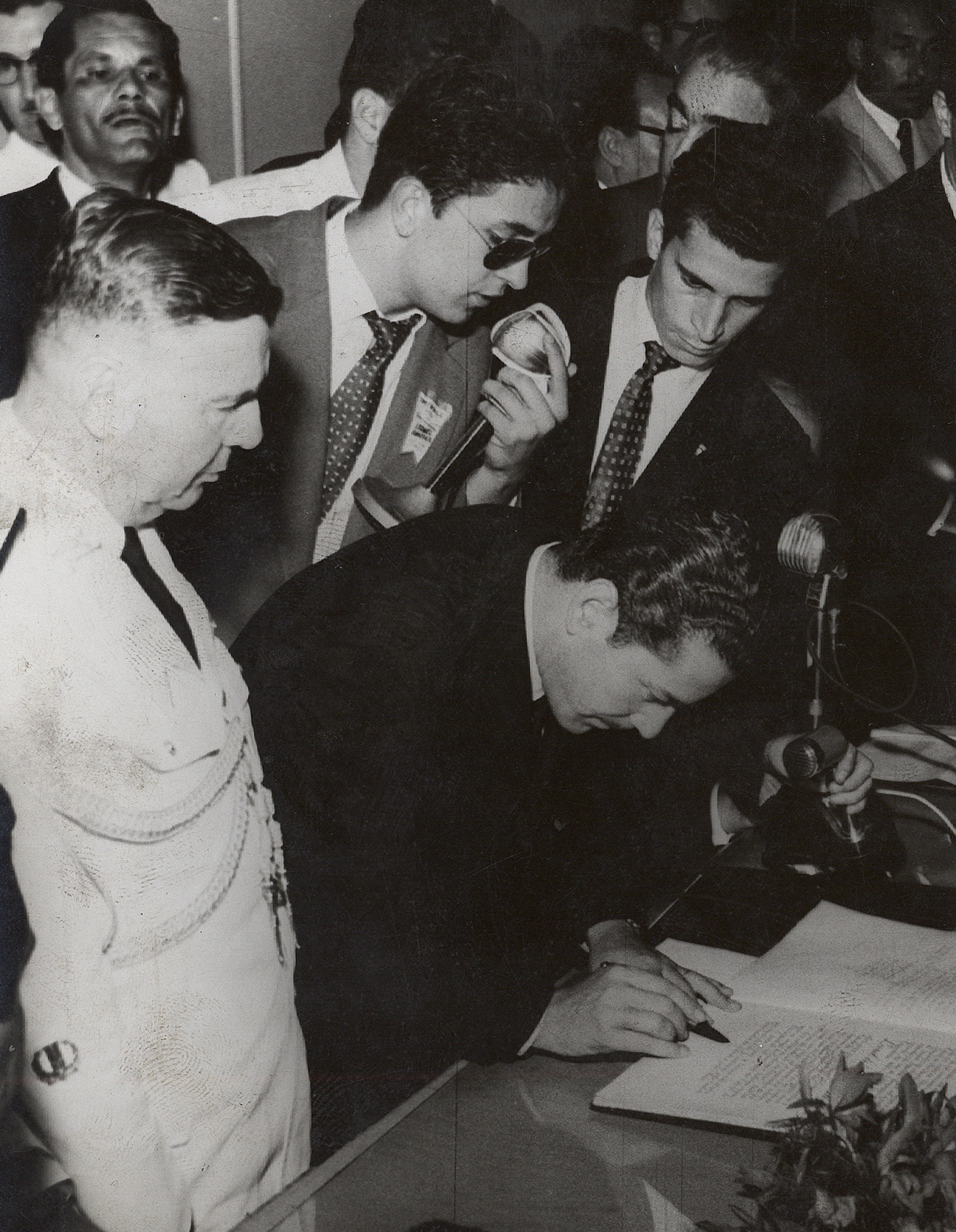
Kruel (on the left) in the inauguration of Leonel Brizola as governor of Rio Grande do Sul, 1959

In 1957, Kruel was appointed by president Juscelino Kubitschek as Chief of Police of the Federal Department of Public Security. In practice, the position was responsible only for the police forces in the Federal District, with some cooperation with the state police forces in political repression. Kruel tried to centralize his power with a National Police Conference in 1958, but the more powerful states did not accept federal interference in their police forces. To gain a trump card over the states, Kruel requested equipment and technical assistance from the United States through USAID. Contacts between Brazilian soldiers and Americans in the police area had existed since the Second World War, and there was a convergence of ambitions (maintenance of order, combating communism and modernization) of part of the Brazilian elite with the providers of American assistance. To secure American support, Kruel insisted he was anti-Communist. Assistance began to be implemented after his administration.

Kruel took office promising to moralize the institution and repress the growing violent attacks against property in Rio de Janeiro, with the order to shoot the assailants who resisted. The plan was to recreate five Surveillance Subsections in areas little covered by the Surveillance Police Station and build a new prison to remedy the shortage of prisons. The fourth station became known in the following decade as the Invernada de Olaria. Some newspapers attributed the creation of Invernada to Kruel, but it had earlier local roots. Kruel also created the "Turma Volante de Repressão aos Assaltos à Mão-Armada" (Note: In any case, the phenomenon did not begin with the "Death Squad". Before the expression was consolidated, the group of Malta was known as "Suicidal", "Suicidal Group", "Turma Volante de Repressão aos Assaltos à Mão-Armada" (TVRAMA), "Turma Volante Especial de Repressão aos Assaltos à Mão Armada" (TVERAMA), "Suicide Battalion”, "Suicide Platoon", "Suicide Patrol" and "Suicide Squad". Here, in summary, are the rudiments of a genealogy of the phenomenon "Death Squad". Oliveira 2016, p. 127.) (TVRAMA), consisting of seven police officers from the Special Diligence Section (SDE), (Note: Neto 2014 uses "Special Due Diligence Service", but according to Oliveira 2016, p. 105, there was no "Service" or "Group", only "Section". It emerged before the Kruel administration.) led by detective Eurípedes Malta, directly under his command. SDE is more widely known than TVRAMA.

The group created by Kruel had carte blanche to repress crime, being accused of torture and summary executions of criminals. The death of Edgar Farias Oliveira, a driver for TV Tupi, in 1958 led to the decline and dismantling of SDE/TVRAMA. Kruel is pointed out by several authors, with some inconsistencies, as the creator of the phenomenon of the "Death Squad", having TVRAMA as one of its manifestations. The name has been used for several different groups, including the Invernada de Olaria. The term already existed in the press at Kruel's time. In 1968, when executions carried out by the Death Squad were discussed in the press, Veja magazine named Kruel as its creator. He did not deny it, pointing out that the result was that "many dangerous criminals were handed over to prison" and added that at his suggestion an equivalent organization was founded in São Paulo.

The "Death Squad" case was not responsible for Kruel's dismissal. There was an atmosphere of dissatisfaction: violence increased despite the measures. Geraldo de Menezes Côrtes, a deputy of the National Democratic Union (UDN) and former foe and Chief of Police in 1955, attacked Kruel's administration and the journalist Mário Morel denounced the corruption of Kruel and the DFSP high command: the same scheme of extortion of businessmen denounced in the previous administration of Batista Teixeira. Nei Kruel, a member of his father's cabinet, was one of the beneficiaries.

A Parliamentary Commission of Inquiry was created to investigate the DFSP. On 26 June, Menezes Côrtes went to Kruel's office, where they exchanged reciprocal aggression. The press reported that Kruel had punched the deputy, leading to his resignation letter to president Juscelino Kubitschek. The inquiry into this incident was dropped, and the witness who incriminated Kruel was prosecuted for perjury; the witness was linked to Cecil Borer, an influential deputy at the disposal of the Chief Constable's office. None of Menezes Côrtes' speeches attacked Borer.

=== João Goulart's government ===
==== Military ally and Minister of War ====
João Goulart's presidential inauguration in 1961

Kruel was appointed ambassador to Bolivia by president Jânio Quadros in 1961, but before taking office, Jânio resigned on 25 August and the military ministers wanted to prevent vice president João Goulart from taking office, igniting a crisis. Kruel refused the position and supported the Legality Campaign, started by Leonel Brizola in Rio Grande do Sul to guarantee Goulart's inauguration. At that time, Kruel had no command of troops. According to journalist Jorge Otero, Kruel went clandestinely to Porto Alegre to assume command of the 3rd Army if its commander, general José Machado Lopes, did not accept Goulart's inauguration. Machado Lopes switched to Brizola on 28 August. Kruel participated in a meeting of generals in Rio de Janeiro, demanding that Minister of War Odílio Denys accept whatever solution the National Congress might have for the crisis. For Emílio Neme, deputy chief of the Military House of Brizola, Kruel only disembarked clandestinely in September, even so at Brizola's disposal.

Goulart appointed Kruel head of the Military Cabinet of the Presidency of the Republic in two periods, from 9 to 19 September 1961 and 12 June to 18 September 1962, and Minister of War from 14 September 1962 to 15 June 1963. While not arousing mistrust among the military right, Kruel was a friend of the president, making him one of the most influential officials, possibly more so than the Minister of War. Kruel maintained Goulart's mandate in the army, devising a defense scheme, isolating the conspirators who subverted the government and ensuring the obedience of various military currents.

According to deputy Wilson Fadul, a week after taking office in September, he accompanied Goulart and Kruel on a fishing trip to Bananal Island. Kruel simply suggested closing Congress, restoring the lost presidential powers to parliamentarism negotiated by congressmen, and passing the base reforms proposed by Goulart via decree. Goulart did not accept this proposal. Kruel accompanied the president on his trip to the United States in April 1962, and was impressed by the Strategic Air Command base in Nebraska.

Military policy also had an offensive use. In June–July 1962, Kruel engineered military pressure on Congress in the interval between the end of the parliamentary cabinet of Tancredo Neves and the beginning of that of Brochado da Rocha. The new cabinet was more suited to Goulart's goal, to bring forward the plebiscite to restore his presidential powers, and Kruel was one of only two military names preserved by the new ministry. According to Moniz Bandeira, Kruel had offered to close Congress during Tancredo's term; impatient with parliamentarism, he would defend a self-coup, but Goulart did not accept it. With the fall of Minister of War Nélson de Melo in October, Kruel took his place. Presidentialism was then restored in January 1963.

==== Crisis in the ministry ====
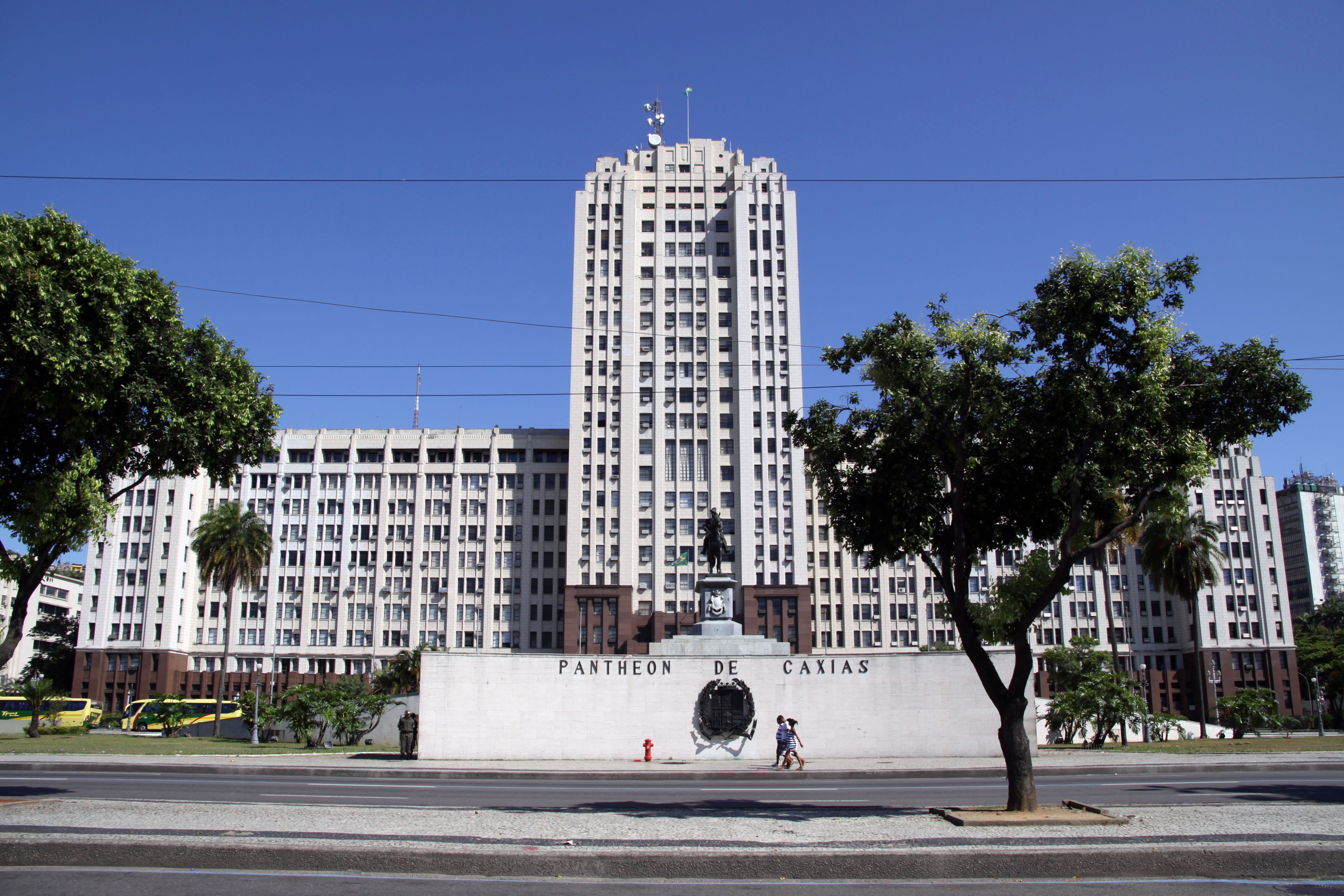
The Duke of Caxias Palace, then seat of the Ministry of War

At the head of the Ministry of War, Kruel was the target of criticism and invitations to conspire against Goulart, and also tried to push the government to the right. He was an arm to the right of the president's support base, matched on the left by Brizola, general Osvino Ferreira Alves and the sergeants movement. In 1963, with presidentialism restored and the military opposition isolated, the support base came into conflict.

In April, a rally of the Popular Mobilization Front was planned in Guanabara, which was governed by the oppositionist Carlos Lacerda; the president gave speeches in Marília, declaring himself to be more anti-Communist than Lacerda; Kruel announced that the army was ready to "carbonize the centers of unrest". Jacob Gorender and Moniz Bandeira, the latter based on accusations made in O Semanário, described these events as part of a maneuver for Lacerda to react violently to the demonstrators, justifying federal intervention in Guanabara and the neutralization of its governor. At the same time, this would allow Kruel to attack general Osvino (commander of the 1st Army, based in Guanabara), the General Workers Command (CGT) and Miguel Arraes, the leftist governor of Pernambuco. However, Bandeira considered Goulart would be afraid of also attacking the left. General Osvino denounced the rally, dismantling the planned operation.

Osvino made public statements of political support for the president, displeasing Kruel. Discontent arose and the name of Jair Dantas Ribeiro was discussed as the next minister of war. Goulart called Kruel and Osvino to a meeting in Brasília to cool the tensions, but the conflict continued to grow. Brizola began to attack Kruel, and in May he entered into conflict with general Antônio Carlos Muricy, commander in Rio Grande do Norte. Muricy received the solidarity of many officers, and Brizola demanded his resignation from the president, but Kruel did not accept it.

The candidacy of sergeants to run in the 1962 elections was a legal controversy, and Kruel was pressing the Supreme Federal Court to declare their ineligibility. The sergeants attacked Kruel's administration, and deputy sergeant Antônio Garcia Filho called him on Rádio Mayrink Veiga the "greatest protector of pimping here, smuggler and corrupt". In May there was a ceremony for sergeants and warrant officers in honor of general Osvino. In the presence of trade union representatives, peasants, students and politicians, sub-lieutenant Jelcy Rodrigues Corrêa spoke: "we will take our work tools and carry out the reforms together with the people, and let the reactionary gentlemen remember that the military's work tool is the rifle". As Minister of War, Kruel considered such politicization of the soldiers as an attack on discipline, calling it "sergeantism". He ordered the arrest of those involved and received the support of 51 officers, both anti-Goulart and 1961 loyalists.

Goulart could not stand the pressure, and Kruel's downfall was increasingly likely. In June 1963 the three military ministers were replaced. Kruel's departure was possibly "the moment when Goulart began to lose control of the military situation". Kruel's successor, Jair Dantas Ribeiro, represented a more left-wing military policy and did not have as much control over the Brazilian Army.

==== The 2nd Army and relationship with the conspirators ====
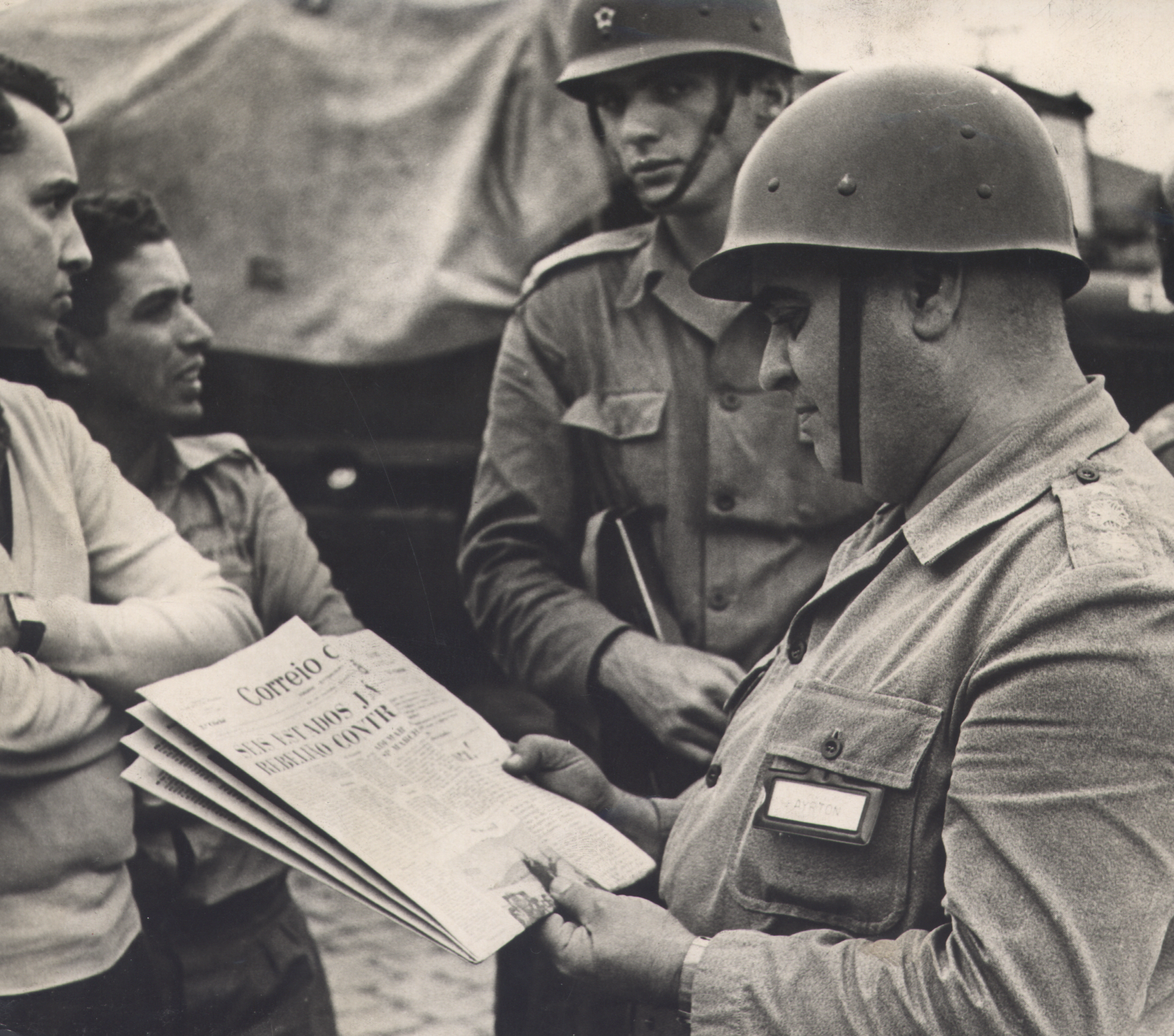
Soldiers of the 2nd Army

The conflict in the government's support base was viewed favorably by the military opposition, which tried to take advantage of it. When Kruel traveled to Rio de Janeiro, where he had been transferred to the War Material sector, he was received by a crowd of generals, including Mascarenhas de Morais and Cordeiro de Farias. They suggested that he refuse to hand over the Ministry of War, but he refused to conspire against the president. Kruel was promoted to army general in November. Since his resignation from the Ministry of War, he spent months without talking to Goulart, displeased, until he was surprised in December when the president called him to command the 2nd Army, in São Paulo. Kruel's name was suggested by his friend Assis Brasil, head of the Military Cabinet.

The timing of Kruel's joining the conspiracy against Goulart is controversial, with many authors considering it as last minute. He probably actually supported Goulart until at least April 1963, switching to the opposition in his last months in the Ministry of War and conspiring against the government after his dismissal. It is possible that he already had contact with conspirators while in office, but there is no proof that he conspired against the government in that position. A CIA report pointed out that Kruel would have participated in a conspiracy meeting in Rio de Janeiro in March 1963, but this is probably from an unreliable source and does not match what is known about the other participants cited. Riograndino Kruel claimed to have suggested to his brother, when he was still minister of war, that he stage a coup, but Amaury replied that he preferred to change the course of the government from within. In the testimonies in História Oral do Exército (Oral History of the Army), there is unanimity that Kruel did not believe in Goulart's political positions. Thus, Kruel faced an ethical dilemma due to personal loyalty, making him indecisive, but his image is positive.

Upon assuming command of the 2nd Army, Kruel was already in advanced contact with conspirators. In São Paulo there were already well-developed civilian and military conspiracies, and Kruel developed an alliance with the governor and conspirator Ademar de Barros. According to civilian conspirator Abreu Sodré, there was a plan to arrest both of them if they obstructed the movement. The American ambassador, Lincoln Gordon, through the military attaché Vernon Walters, brought Kruel and Castelo Branco, now one of the main conspirators, closer together after decades of rupture. Riograndino was the main intermediary between his brother and Castelo Branco.

The 2nd Army would be the "scale tipper" in the overthrow of the president Goulart, whatever its position; for Castelo Branco, the joining or not of São Paulo to the conspiracy was the difference between a calculated risk and an adventure. In March 1964, the government's military leadership already suspected Kruel would betray them. Weeks before the coup, military exercises simulated an action by the 1st Army against São Paulo. Newspapers published rumors of Kruel's transfer from the 2nd Army. On 28 March, meeting with 42 officers, Kruel declared that he would not hand over command. Some wanted him to start the revolt right then and there, but he replied that "the time has to be exact". The remaining conspirators were unsure of Kruel's loyalty. That same day, Olímpio Mourão Filho, conspirator and commander of the 4th Military Region/Infantry Division, in Minas Gerais, went to Rio de Janeiro, where he obtained a guarantee from Riograndino that he would not have São Paulo against him. On the 29th Kruel gave his "OK" to Castelo Branco. On 30 March, general Ulhoa Cintra reported that Kruel felt no obligation to obey the president. (Note: Joint Chiefs of Staff, Cable, Military attaché Vernon Walters Report on Coup Preparations, Secret, March 30, 1964. Cintra reported to Vernon Walters, through whom the information reached the CIA.)

=== 1964 coup d'état ===
==== Decision ====
At 07:00 on the morning of 31 March, Kruel received a call from general Lindolfo Ferraz, on vacation in São Lourenço, Minas Gerais. The Military Police of Minas Gerais left the city. At the same time, another phone call from Riograndino, informed by Castelo Branco, confirmed the start of the coup. In the morning, an emissary was sent to the 5th and 6th Infantry Regiments (RIs) in the Paraíba valley to convey the information and instruct them to only obey orders from the 2nd Army command. The 2nd Army was brought to readiness at 14:30, but its position was anyone's guess. Some subordinates were already preparing their regiments. Kruel did not believe in the success of the revolt started in Minas Gerais by Olímpio Mourão Filho. There was telephone contact with Rio de Janeiro, including with president Goulart, who tried several times to contact Kruel, only succeeding at 17:00. They had three conversations for the rest of the day. The president invited Kruel to Rio de Janeiro, but he declined.

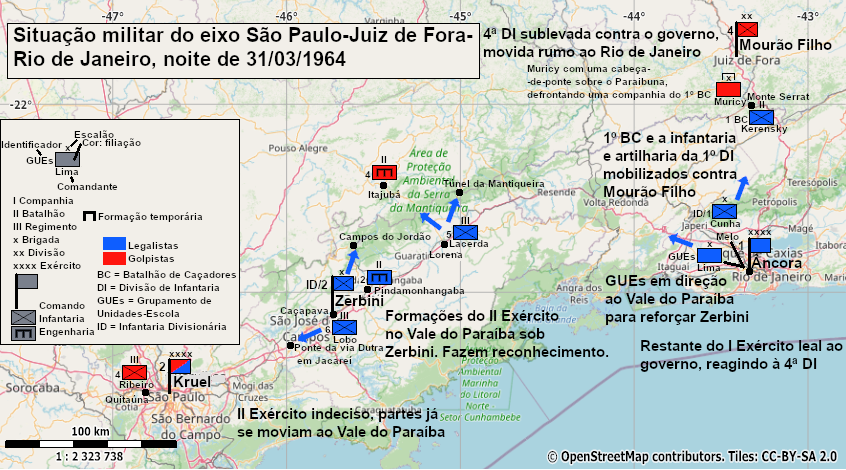
Military situation on the Rio-São Paulo axis on the night of 31 March, with Zerbini in the Paraíba valley

Three of Kruel's generals were part of the ruling military apparatus: Armando Bandeira de Morais, from the 2nd Military Region, Aloísio de Miranda Mendes, from the 2nd Infantry Division, and Euryale de Jesus Zerbini, from the Divisional Infantry of the 2nd DI. Morais and Mendes considered the beginning of the coup in Minas Gerais to be isolated and precocious. At 16:00 or 17:00 (Note: Zerbini's testimony in Silva 2014, p. 351, places what happened around 16:00, and Duarte 1964, p. 142, at 17:00.) Kruel called an evening meeting with his generals—these three and Lindolfo Ferraz Filho, from the Divisional Artillery of the 2nd DI, and Carlos Buick Júnior, from the Military Garrison of Santos. At 17:00, Kruel transferred his HQ to the headquarters of the 2nd DI, to facilitate the convincing of generals Morais and Mendes, returning to the HQ of the 2nd Army in the evening.

Around 18:00, according to the testimony of the then pharmaceutical major Erimá Pinheiro Moreira, Kruel was at the General Military Hospital of São Paulo. In Moreira's laboratory, Kruel had a secret meeting with Raphael de Souza Noschese, president of the Federation of Industries of the State of São Paulo (Fiesp), receiving six suitcases of money with a total of U$1.2 million. For witnessing the bribery, Moreira was later removed from office.

The generals' meeting began at 20:00, with Lindolfo and Zerbini absent. The former would only return from vacation three days later, upsetting Kruel, while the latter avoided the meeting and went to his headquarters in Caçapava to prevent the participation of the regiments from the Paraíba Valley in the coup. At 21:00, Artur da Costa e Silva got in touch with Kruel, who said he was willing to join the coup, but faced the reluctance of generals Morais and Mendes. Costa e Silva would then have convinced both. (Note: Faria 2013, p. 408. The source is Jaime Portela de Melo, who usually attributes decisive actions to Costa e Silva.) Kruel only wanted to participate in the coup after verifying the obedience of the troops and the governors of São Paulo and Minas Gerais having issued their manifestos. If he did not comply, some of his subordinates planned to arrest him and hand over command to colonel Carlos Alberto Cabral Ribeiro, of the 4th Infantry Regiment.

However, unlike the other participants in the coup, Kruel still wanted to leave the president an alternative. His priority was not to unseat him, but to impose a turn to the right in the government. In his second call, at 22:00, and in the last, around midnight, in the presence of the generals, Kruel offered his support if Goulart closed down the CGT and other popular organizations, intervened in the trade unions and removed the auxiliaries most associated with radicalism, such as Abelardo Jurema, Minister of Labor, and Darcy Ribeiro, from the Civilian Cabinet. However, Goulart estimated that he would become a mere decorative president. To the second phone call, Goulart replied: "I am a political man", who could not break with his allies in the parties and trade unions. Their principles conflicted. In the last phone call, with the conversation seeming like an ultimatum, Goulart's tone became ceremonious, declaring, according to the sources:

I never had the support of either the political forces or the Armed Forces during my government. I just had difficulties. If now, in this crucial hour, I get rid of those around me, it amounts to suicide. (Note: Testimony of Ladário Pereira Teles, heard from João Goulart in Porto Alegre. Silva 2014, p. 354.)

General, I don't abandon my friends. If those are your conditions, I don't examine them. I prefer to stay with my origins. You, sir, stick with your convictions. Put the troops in the streets and openly betray me.

And then hung up the phone.

==== Military operations ====
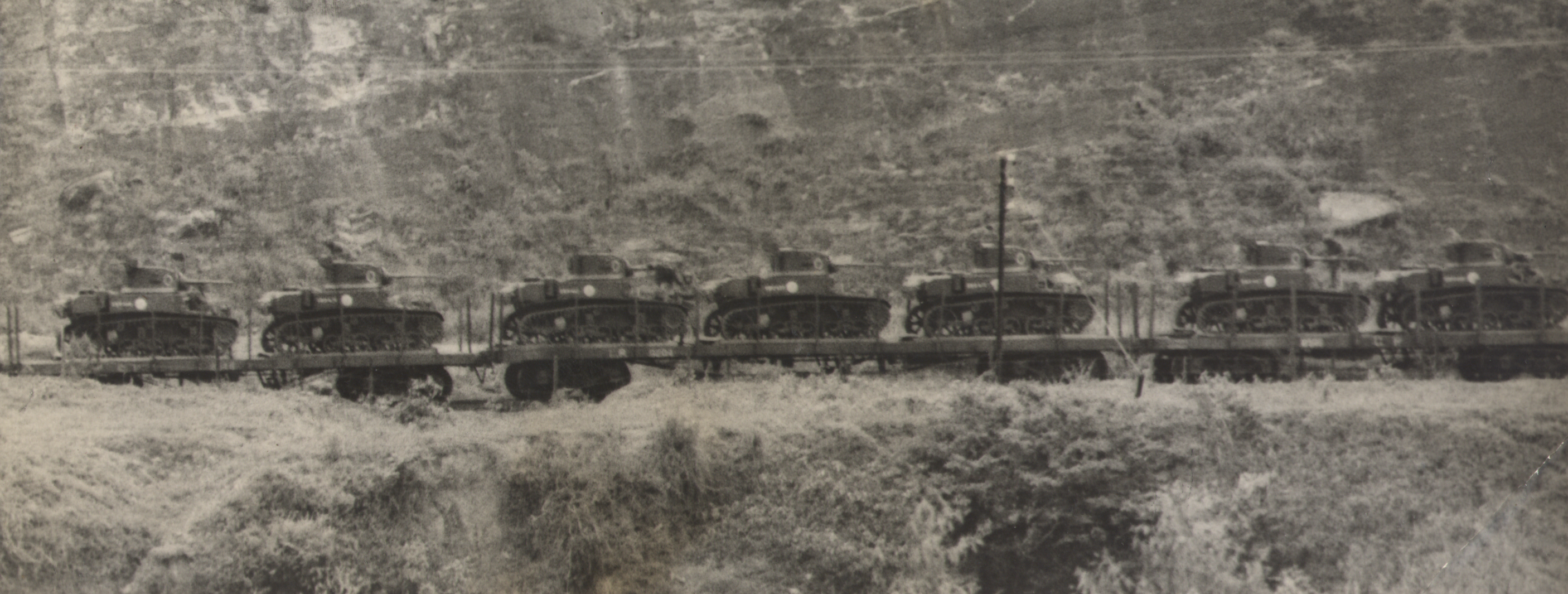
2nd Army tanks being rail transported

According to what he had heard from Goulart, Kruel was already putting the troops out on the streets. Shortly before midnight, he opened the door of his office and to an antechamber of colonels and majors, he said: "here is my order. I have already determined the displacement of the 2nd Army to Rio de Janeiro". He issued a proclamation talking about "saving the homeland in danger, freeing it from the red yoke", without, however, mentioning the president, still trying to wall him up without deposing him. Word spread across the country and reached Congress. Mourão Filho, who was leading Operation Popeye from Minas Gerais, felt relieved that he was no longer isolated. Military testimonies considered Kruel indispensable for the success of the coup. Due to being respected among a large part of the officers, many waited for his position before joining the coup, such as the commanders of Fort Copacabana, the Amazon Military Command and the 3rd Cavalry Division.

On 1 April, the 2nd Army ordered internal control in São Paulo, the march of the 16th Battalion of Hunters from Cuiabá to Brasília, passing through Jataí, and the advance of the forces from São Paulo towards Guanabara through the Paraíba valley. At dawn the valley regiments, until then held back by general Zerbini, began to accept Kruel's authority. In Guanabara, general Ancora's 1st Army sent the School Unit Group to face the São Paulo offensive.

Halfway down Via Dutra was the Military Academy of Agulhas Negras (AMAN) in the municipality of Resende. After 02:00 in the morning, Kruel telephoned its commander, general Emílio Garrastazu Médici, and obtained free passage for the 2nd Army. A battle of the loyalists against the 2nd Army and AMAN soldiers seemed inevitable. Kruel suggested to Médici that he make a defense with the regular forces available in the area, but instead Médici positioned the Cadets Corps on the road, blocking the advance of the School Units Group's soldiers. They made contact near Barra Mansa in the afternoon. The most advanced echelon of the 2nd Army stayed further back, in Resende.

Kruel's change of sides was one of the reasons for Goulart's departure from Rio de Janeiro at 12:45. The military apparatus in the 1st Army began to crumble. In the afternoon, general Ancora, who responded temporarily for the Ministry of War, agreed with Kruel a conference at AMAN to negotiate. When Kruel arrived at 18:00, Ancora acknowledged the military defeat of the 1st Army. His troops were withdrawn without engaging in combat. The tone was not very friendly. Kruel stated: "you just came to say good night! You're no longer a minister and don't think about resisting!" An important point of the meeting was the recognition of Costa e Silva's tenure at the Ministry of War, blocking the occupation of the position by Castelo Branco.

On 2 April, the 3rd Army remained, to where Goulart went to, where there were still loyalists in Rio Grande do Sul. The 5th Military Region/Infantry Division, in Paraná and Santa Catarina, already participated in the coup and was transferred from the 3rd to the 2nd Army. Tactical Group 4 was sent from São Paulo to Curitiba. Kruel issued a proclamation to the military of Rio Grande do Sul. According to Cordeiro de Farias, he had a personal reckoning to do with Leonel Brizola, using the forces sent by Paraná. They stayed in Curitiba and then returned, as Goulart left Rio Grande do Sul and there was no more loyalist resistance.

=== Career in the military dictatorship ===
==== Post-coup d'état ====
With Goulart's fall, Kruel traveled to Rio de Janeiro on 3 April. His position at the time was that the military should not be in power. However, when the succession of a military officer to the presidency of Brazil became clear, Kruel was considered as a possible candidate, although the favorite one was Castelo Branco. Ademar de Barros endorsed his name, as it was customary for governors to propose the generals of their states, before supporting Castelo Branco. Kruel was considered a centrist general. Costa e Silva was in favor of the anti-Castelo candidacy. Sectors of the Brazilian Labor Party (PTB), Goulart's party, defended Kruel's candidacy as a way, albeit ineffective, to bring together what was left of the military left, and a few politicians saw it as a way to preserve the power of the PTB alliance with the Social Democratic Party (PSD). On the other hand, precisely because of his association with Goulart, Kruel's candidacy was frowned upon by many officers, who also did not accept him for having a troop command post. Kruel's supporters offered Eurico Gaspar Dutra, another alternative candidate for Castelo, to join forces, but he declined. Kruel abandoned his candidacy in the name of military unity.

Kruel was one of the supporters of the "cleaning operation", articulating, together with the Department of Political and Social Order, the immediate arrest of leftist leaders, especially of the CGT, starting on 1 April. He ordered the purge of military personnel considered leftist and identified by the General Staff of the Second Army. The National Truth Commission named Kruel as one of those responsible for "managing structures and carrying out procedures aimed at committing serious violations of human rights".

==== "Countercoup" and final years in politics ====
Ademar de Barros

Politically, Kruel was one of the "independent officers" with no clear faction. In 1966, he supported the Minister of War Costa e Silva in his dispute with Castelo Branco. Since 1964 he had some involvement in conspiracies against Castelo Branco, allied with Ademar de Barros, whose deposition by the federal government was possible. According to a report that reached the Guanabara Security Secretariat in 1965, a colonel visited João Goulart in exile in Uruguay claiming to represent Kruel. He allegedly said that "we are in a position to overthrow the Caestelo (sic) government, as long as the former president no longer thinks about three things: CGT, communism and Brizola". Ademar intensified his articulations in the first half of 1966, uniting discontent from leftist groups such as the Communist Party to former coup supporters in a "countercoup" project.

In addition to his alliance with Ademar, Kruel worked against Castelo Branco due to the frustration of his plan to run for governor of São Paulo. The Ineligibility Law (applied to all ministers under Goulart from 1963) and the Electoral Domicile Law (requiring an electoral domicile of four years or more to run in elections in the contested state) prevented Kruel's candidacy. General Joaquim Justino Alves Bastos, of the 3rd Army, had the same frustration and participated in the plan. An emissary arrested at the Uruguayan border in 1966 was found with documents linking both to Uruguayan asylum seekers. The planned revolt would depend on the strength of both for a possible armed conflict. There was a plan to restore general Zerbini to command. The objectives of the "countercoup" would be direct elections, restitution of closed political parties and the abolition of the Institutional Acts.

Under increasing pressure from the federal government, Ademar de Barros ended up giving in without resistance, being removed from office for corruption in 1966. Castelo Branco summoned Kruel and informed him of his intention to depose Ademar. Kruel, whose loyalty the government already doubted, made no objection and personally handed over the copy of the Diário Oficial da União with the act of removal, keeping the 2nd Army in readiness. The general also fell under the radar, being informed of his irrevocable transfer to the General Staff of the Army, in Rio de Janeiro. It was the same maneuver previously used by Goulart against Castelo Branco. Kruel deviated from the measure by asking to go to the reserve. With that, he was automatically promoted to marshal. On 11 August, Kruel launched a manifesto against the dictatorship, calling the recent impeachments "an instrument to elect candidates of the personal liking of the head of the Executive branch". Riograndino Kruel tried to intercede for his brother with the president, and failing that, he resigned as head of the Federal Police Department.

At that time Kruel criticized political repression, indirect elections and the regime's direction. For the Brazilianist Maud Chirio, Kruel acted out of "frustrated ambitions, a feeling of illegitimacy of power and real liberal concerns". The manifesto had so much repercussion that Diário de S. Paulo announced Kruel's arrest, which did not happen. He ran in the 1966 elections for the opposition party Brazilian Democratic Movement, winning an alternate seat as federal deputy for Guanabara. In this position, held from 1966 to 1971, he was an effective member of the Security Commission and defended the creation of a state-owned company for nuclear technology. At the end of his term, Kruel withdrew from public life, dedicating himself to his farm in Linhares and business work.

== Notes ==
Political offices
Preceded by Ernesto Geisel	Head of the Military Cabinet; 1961	Succeeded by Aurélio de Lira Tavares
Preceded by Aurélio de Lira Tavares	Head of the Military Cabinet; 1962	Succeeded by Albino Silva
Preceded by Nélson de Melo	Minister of War; 1962–1963	Succeeded by Jair Dantas Ribeiro
