= 12th Light Infantry Brigade (Airmobile) =

- 12.ª Brigada de Infantaria Leve (Aeromóvel)
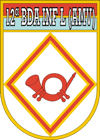
- The brigade's insignia
- Active: 1995 - present
- Country: Brazil
- Branch: Brazilian Army
- Part of: 2nd Army Division
- Garrison/HQ: Caçapava, São Paulo
- Nickname: Fornovo di Taro Brigade
- Colors: Beige (beret)
- Website: bdaamv.eb.mil.br

Commanders
- Current commander: Rodrigo Ferraz Silva

The 12th Light Infantry Brigade (Airmobile) (Portuguese: 12.ª Brigada de Infantaria Leve (Aeromóvel), 12ª Bda Inf L (Amv)) is a large unit of the Brazilian Army based in Caçapava, São Paulo. It is subordinated to the 2nd Army Division. Since 1995 its elements have been transported by Army Aviation helicopters, being able to quickly operate in any part of Brazil's territory.

Its troops can be infiltrated on the front lines, with different risks, in the enemy rear in airmobile assaults. The brigade has participated in several political-military events in Brazil's history, and some of its personnel was part of the Brazilian Expeditionary Force in World War II, giving rise to its name "Brigada Fornovo di Taro" (Fornovo di Taro Brigade) in honor of the homonymous battle.

== History ==
=== Development of the organization ===
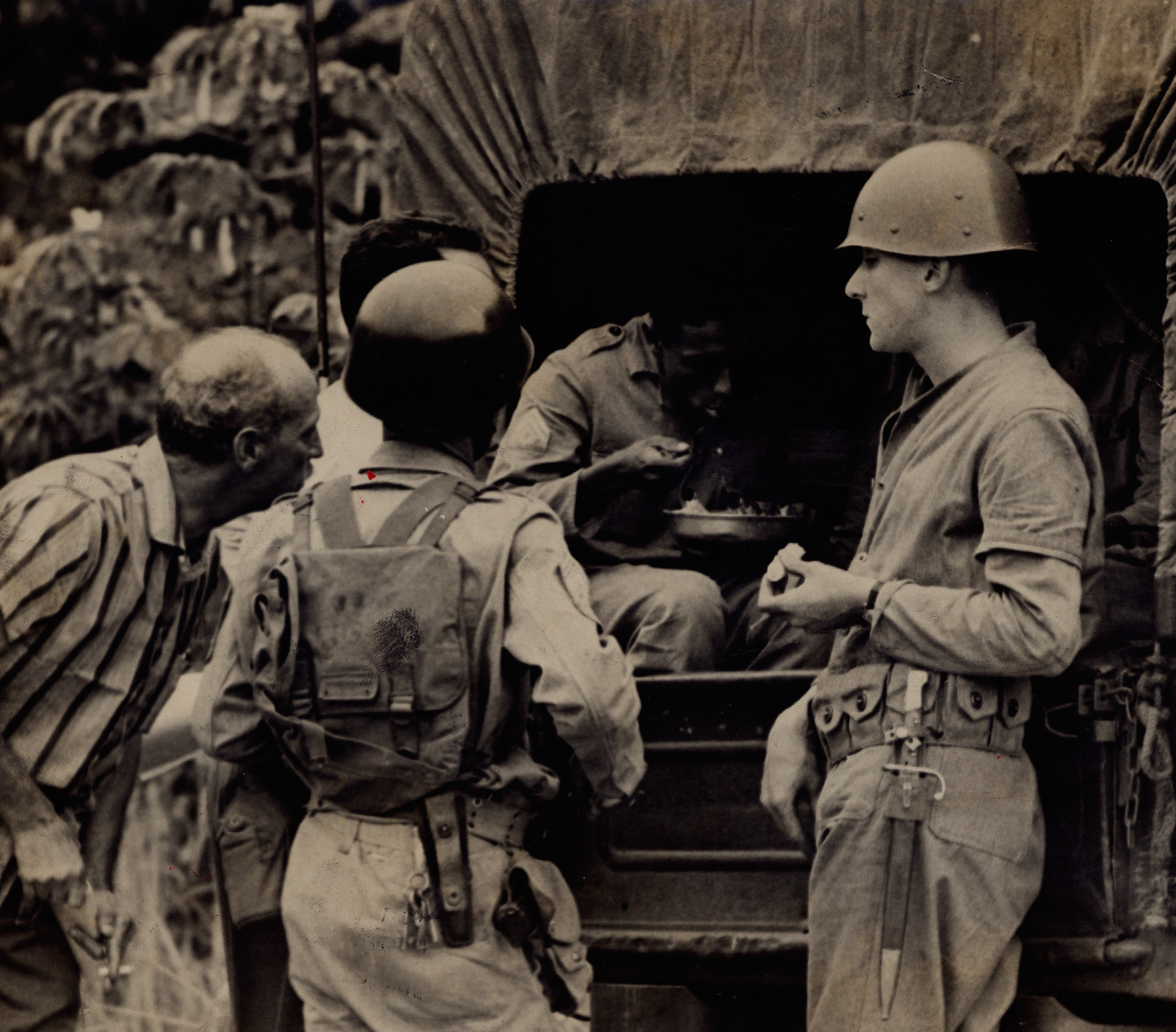
São Paulo soldiers in 1964

At the beginning of the 20th century, the reorganization of the Brazilian Army in the Old Republic created several infantry brigades within the new divisions. Consisting solely of infantry, they had no autonomy. After two command predecessors, first in Mato Grosso do Sul and then in Minas Gerais, the 4th Infantry Brigade was formed in Caçapava in 1919.

It consisted of the 6th Infantry Regiment (RI), at headquarters, and the 4th, 5th and 6th Battalions of Caçadores (BCs), respectively in São Paulo, Lorena and Ipameri. They were all in São Paulo, with the exception of the 6th BC, in Goiás, where it was strategically on the Goiás Railroad. At the time, Goiás was part, along with São Paulo, of the 2nd Military Region.

In 1938 the Infantry Divisions (DIs) regiments were grouped into Divisional Infantries; in the 2nd Infantry Division, in São Paulo, they were the 4th, 5th and 6th Infantry Regiments. The 4th, 5th, and 6th BCs did not belong to the new formation. The 4th Infantry Brigade became the Divisional Infantry of the 2nd DI, or ID/2. Its two new regiments (4th and 5th) came from the 3rd Infantry Brigade, which was disbanded. All were in the state of São Paulo. Between 1946 and 1952 it was transformed into the Subcommand of the 2nd DI, then returning to Divisional Infantry.

In 1960, ID/2 was composed of the 4th RI, in Osasco, with two battalions, the 5th, in Lorena, with one battalion, and the 6th, in Caçapava, also with only one. From the end of the decade the brigade became the major main unit of the Brazilian Army, endowed with sufficient maneuver and support units for its autonomy, while the infantry regiments were suppressed. ID/2 became the 12th Infantry Brigade, composed of the 5th Infantry Battalion (BI, from the 5th RI), 6th BI (from the 6th RI), 39th BI Motorized (BI Mtz, from the 4th RI) and 20th Field Artillery Group (GAC). The 4th RI also gave rise to the 4th Armored BI (BIB), which remained with the 11th Infantry Brigade. The area of responsibility was Greater São Paulo (shared with the 11th brigade) and the Paraíba valley. In 1985 the Brigade received the designation of Motorized. The following year, it already had an anti-aircraft battery, but it lacked a communications company, combat engineering company, and cavalry squadron.

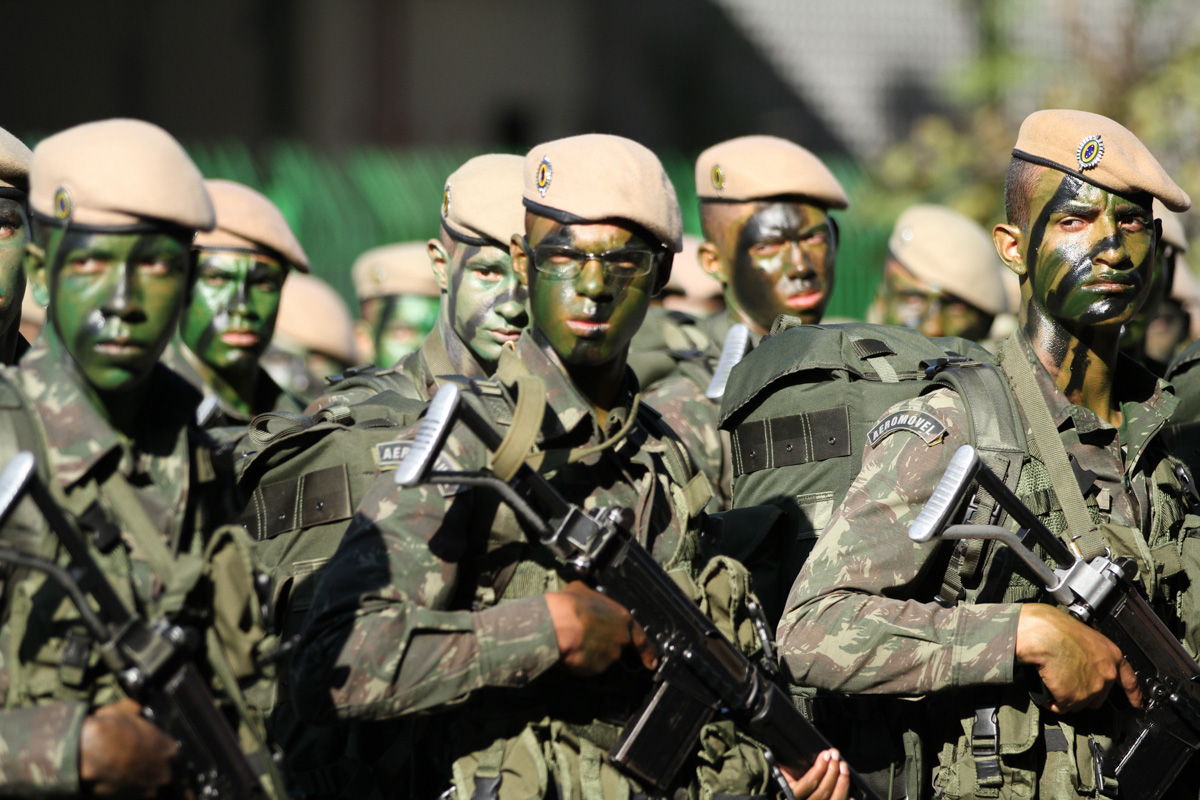
Airmobile fighters beige beret

From 1986, the Brazilian Army created units with helicopters. Since the 1960s, the creation of an "air cavalry" with helicopters, inspired by the Americans in the Vietnam War, was already being discussed, but they emerged out of the cavalry branch. The Army Aviation Command was created in 1989. Some studies suggested a light troop to be transported by their helicopters, and the original idea was to create them in Formosa, Goiás — originally Army Aviation was headquartered in Brasília — but instead the 12th Brigade was converted to light infantry in 1995. The creation of the Special Operations Command, at about the same time, belonged to the same trend of new rapid deployment forces.

In 2005, the 4th BIL was disbanded and the 39th BIL was renamed the 4th BIL. In 2022, it was transferred to the 11th Light Infantry Brigade, which is receiving Guarani armored personnel carriers for conversion into mechanized infantry, while the 2nd BIL, until then belonging to the 11th Brigade, was transferred to the 12th, becoming an airmobile unit.

=== Deployments ===
6th RI in Massarosa, Italy (1944)

The three brigade units in São Paulo, with the exception of half of the 4th BC, joined the São Paulo Revolt of 1924. In 1926, amid the expectation of a federal intervention in Goiás, several testimonies attested that a platoon from São Paulo reinforced the 6th BC in Ipameri. The intervention did not materialize. The battalion had a skirmish with part of the Prestes Column on its way through Goiás on its way to Bolivia.

In the Revolution of 1930, the 4th BC was among the loyalist forces on the border of São Paulo and Paraná, acting in the regions of Quatiguá and Itararé. In Goiás, the 6th BC remained neutral in the conflict between Goiás loyalists and Minas Gerais revolutionaries. As a result of the revolution, the command of the brigade was temporarily extinguished. In the Constitutionalist Revolution of 1932, the 6th BC participated in the offensive against the north and northwest of São Paulo, while the 6th RI and 4th BC were with the constitutionalists, the latter with a company in Santos and the former in Cunha. The Brigade was reactivated in October, at the end of the revolution.

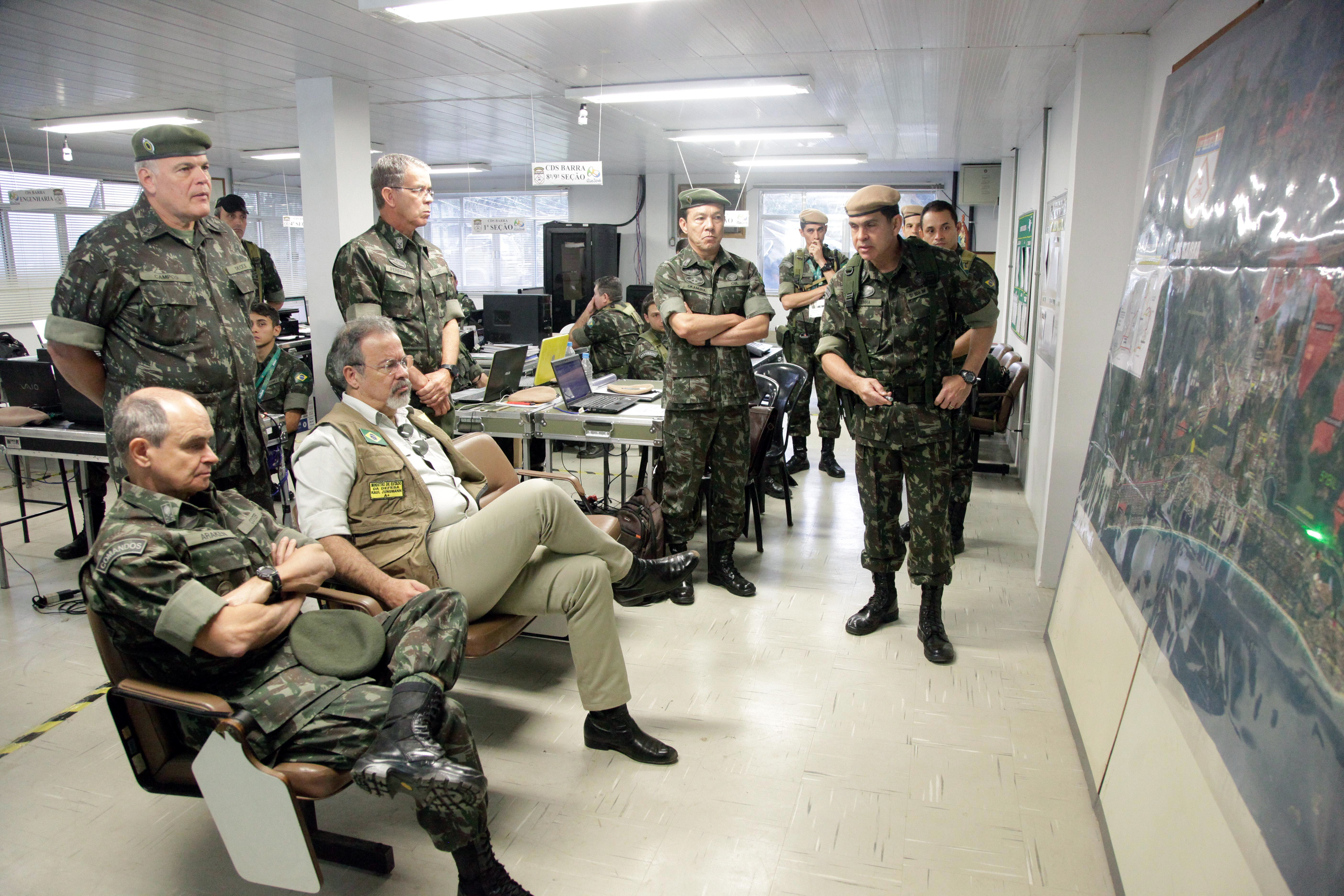
Brigade soldiers in security planning for the 2016 Olympics

In World War II, the 6th RI was one of the three infantry regiments to integrate the Brazilian Expeditionary Force, arriving in the Italian campaign in the first echelon of the FEB, in July 1944. The brigade's name honors the regiment's participation in the battle of Fornovo di Taro in April 1945. Two other current brigade units, its artillery and cavalry, were also in Italy. Its cavalry was the only one from the FEB, the 1st Mechanized Reconnaissance Squadron. It fought in American M8 Greyhound armored cars at a time when mechanization of the Brazilian cavalry was still limited.

During João Goulart's government, ID/2 was with general Euryale de Jesus Zerbini, a member of Goulart's military apparatus and the only general of Amaury Kruel's 2nd Army to remain faithful to the government in the 1964 coup d'état. Zerbini managed to delay, but failed to prevent the participation of the 5th and 6th RIs in operations in the Paraíba Valley. The 4th RI went to Curitiba as part of Tactical Group 4. Zerbini was punished for his opposition to the coup. Later, in 1966, he participated with Kruel in a frustrated plan for a "countercoup" against the government of Castelo Branco. Military measures would include restoring Zerbini to command in the Paraíba Valley.

In 2018, the brigade contributed approximately 450 men in rotation to the federal intervention in Rio de Janeiro and acted on the highways of São Paulo during the truckers strike. In conjunction with the U.S. Army's 101st Airborne Division, Task Force Itororó of the 12th Brigade participated in the "Core 21" exercise in the Paraíba Valley in 2021.

== Capabilities ==
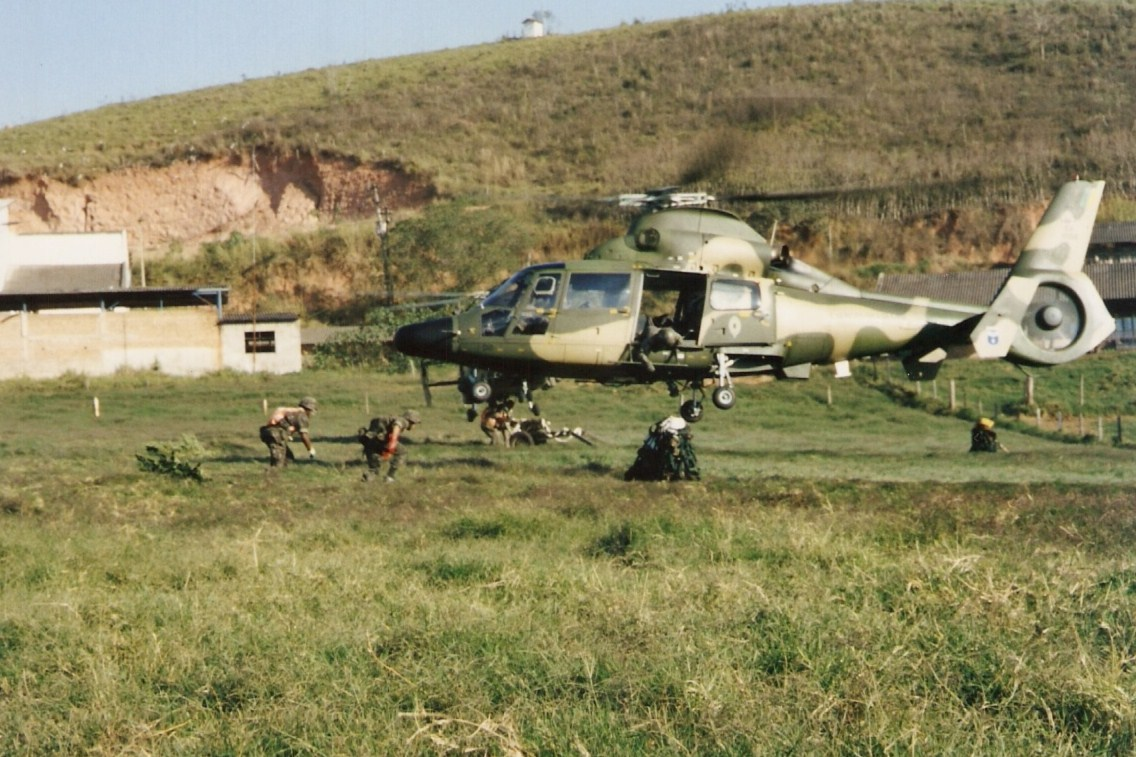
Airmobile operation with howitzers

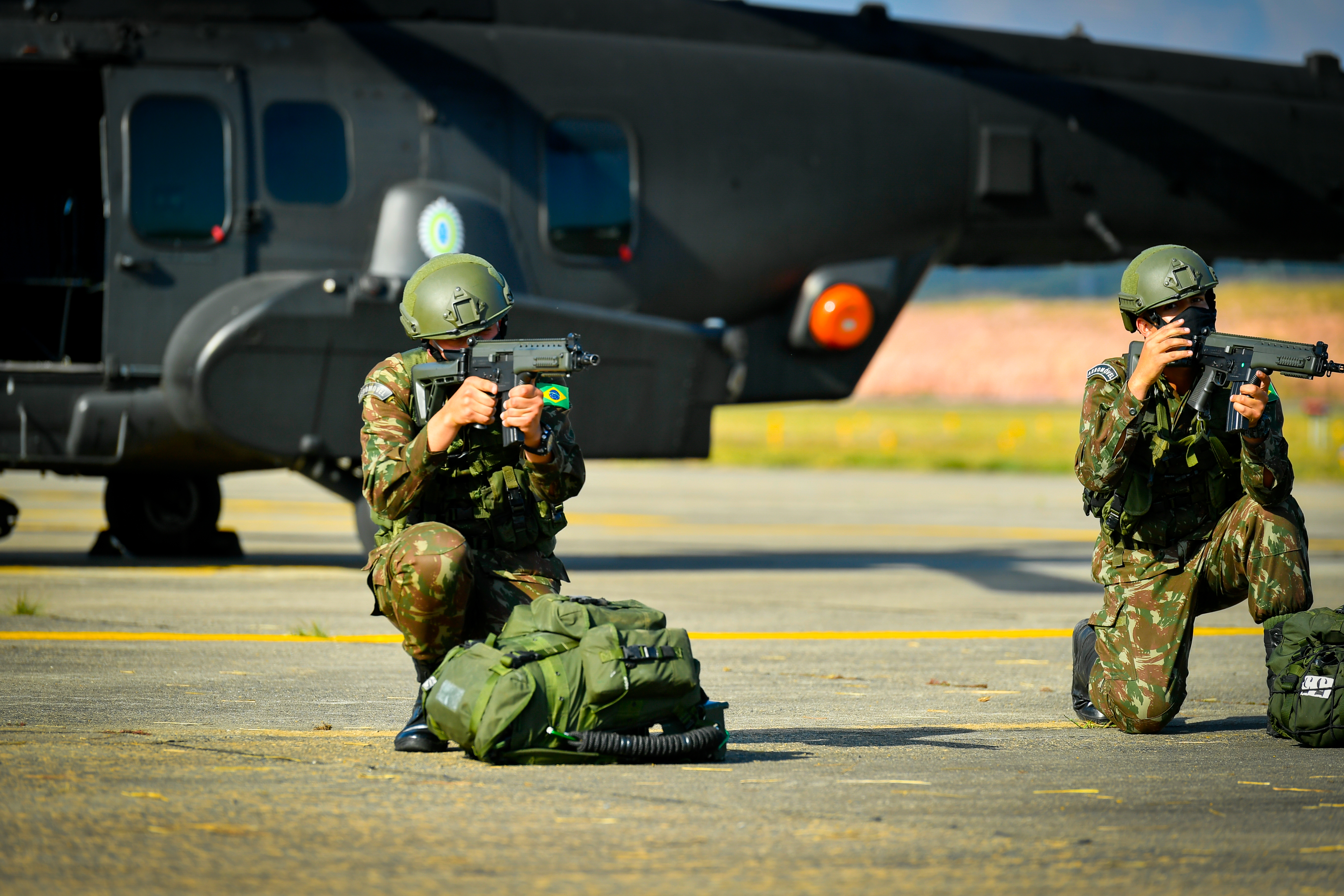
Equipment of airmobile fighters

Positioned in the central core of the country and with rapid displacement, the brigade is part of the Brazilian Army's strategic reserve. Like the Parachute Infantry Brigade, it must quickly operate in any part of Brazil's territory. The mobility of its light infantry comes from Army Aviation helicopters, and therefore it is close to its Command and the 1st and 2nd Army Aviation Battalions in Taubaté. In São Paulo, the brigade can also take advantage of some of the main airports and a good road network. Its garrison in Lorena has already been described as a "key point of communications between Rio, São Paulo and Minas Gerais".

Brazilian military doctrine considers light infantry battalions ideal for airmobile assault, an offensive operation by mixed task forces of Army Aviation together with surface forces. They must occupy weakly defended positions in the enemy rear, where they control an airmobile bridgehead until other forces arrive. If performed at night, with night vision, it is more complex but with better secrecy. The doctrine recognizes in these operations the vulnerability of helicopters, the restricted foot mobility of the infantry after disembarking and their vulnerability in the open field, which should last only 48 hours after the interruption of the logistical flow. It foresees assaults within range of the upper echelon artillery, but within the maximum range of 18 km for the Brazilian 155 mm Divisional Artillery it is unlikely to find a weakly defended position in the rear. Artillery support can still be provided from within the bridgehead. The surrounded bridgehead can make a circular defense.

The carrying capacity of helicopters is a limitation. The ideal in an airmobile assault is to land in a single wave, against an unsuspecting enemy, but the 30 transport helicopters present in Taubaté in 2021 would be insufficient to transport at once a light infantry battalion task force, with 715 military personnel and their armaments. In 2022, the base in Taubaté had 18 HM-1 Pantera, with a capacity of 9 passengers, 4 HM-3 Cougar, with 24 seats, and 7 HM-4 Jaguar, with 27 seats.

Outside the brigade, the 1st Jungle Infantry Battalion is also an airmobile unit, and Army Aviation works with other units, such as those currently belonging to the Special Operations Command.

== Current organization ==
=== Equipment and number ===
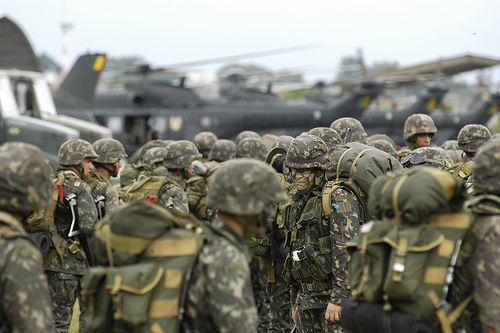

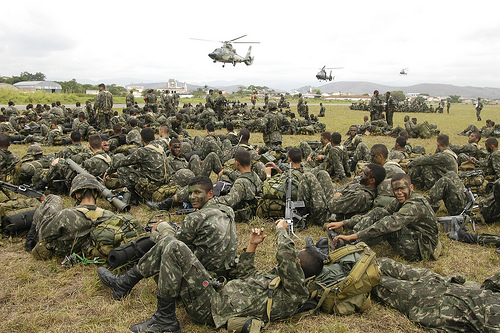
Airmobile infantry training

The brigade's infantry has smaller and less heavily armed light rifle platoons than paratroopers, possibly due to the helicopters' carrying capacity. In the 1990s, the reduced carrying capacity of the HM-1 Pantera limited airmobile infantry combat groups to seven men. The new transport helicopters available in the following decade, such as the HM-3 Cougar, allowed two groups of nine men to be carried on board. Individual weapons include the ParaFAL. The battalions have three companies of riflemen and, within the command and support company, a reconnaissance platoon to infiltrate the landing areas before the main force. They have some limitations compared to parachute precursors.

The cavalry squadron, mechanized until 2004 and light since then, had two squadrons of explorers, equipped with Agrale Marruá vehicles and motorcycles, and one of mechanized marines, with Marruá and EE-11 Urutu in 2015. Doctrine provides for three platoons of scouts. Compared to other cavalry platoons, their firepower and armor are limited. The artillery group uses the 105 mm M56 Oto Melara howitzer and the 120 mm M2 rifled heavy mortar, both of which can be heliported. The anti-aircraft battery uses Igla portable surface-to-air missiles and the M60 Saber Radar.

=== Structure ===
The brigade's current structure
- Command and Company Brigade Command (Caçapava, São Paulo)
- 2nd Light Infantry Battalion "Martim Afonso Battalion" (São Vicente, São Paulo)
- 5th Light Infantry Battalion "Itororó Regiment" (Lorena, São Paulo)
- 6th Light Infantry Battalion "Ipiranga Regiment" (Caçapava, São Paulo)
- 20th Light Field Artillery Group "Bandeirante Group" (Barueri, São Paulo)
- 22nd Light Logistics Battalion (Barueri, São Paulo)
- 1st Light Cavalry Squadron "Tenente Amaro Squadron" (Valença, Rio de Janeiro)
- 5th Light Anti-Aircraft Artillery Battery (Osasco, São Paulo)
- 12th Light Combat Engineering Company (Pindamonhangaba, São Paulo)
- 12th Light Communications Company (Caçapava, São Paulo)
- 12th Army Police Platoon (Caçapava, São Paulo)
