= Wladimir Pomar =

Brazilian writer and political activist (1936–2023)

- Born: Wladimir Ventura Torres Pomar; 14 July 1936; Belém, Pará, Brazil
- Died: 9 June 2023 (aged 86); São Bernardo do Campo, Greater São Paulo, Brazil
- Occupation: Writer

Wladimir Ventura Torres Pomar (14 July 1936 – 9 June 2023) was a Brazilian writer, journalist and political activist.

== Life and career ==
Born in Belém, Pomar was the son of the Communist Party of Brazil founder Pedro Pomar, who was killed by the military regime in 1976. A Communist Party militant since young age and a leading figure in the student movement and in the metalworkers' trade union, he lived in clandestinity for several years, and he was arrested twice, in 1964 in a protest against the dictatorship and in 1976 in the military operation that led to the killing of his father.

Released from prison in 1979, in the early 1980s Pomar joined the Workers' Party, and in 1989 he coordinated the Luiz Inácio Lula da Silva's presidential campaign. As a writer, he authored about 20 books, mainly focusing on the history of Brasil and the economic development of China. He also collaborated as an editor and a columnist with numerous publications, including Tribuna Popular, Classe Operária, Movimento, Correio Agropecuário, Brasil Extra, Correio da Cidadania and Teoria e Debate.

Pomar died of complications from dysplasia on 9 June 2023, at the age of 86.
