= Armando de Moraes Âncora =

Brazilian army general (1901–1964)

Army general Armando de Moraes Âncora
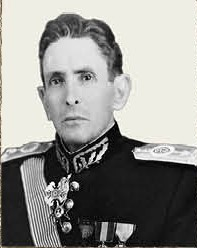

Commander of the 1st Army
- In office 2 August 1963 – 1 April 1964
- Preceded by: Osvino Ferreira Alves
- Succeeded by: Octacílio Terra Ururahy

Commander of the 1st Military Region
- In office 8 August 1959 – 4 January 1960
- Preceded by: Nestor Souto de Oliveira
- Succeeded by: Joaquim Justino Alves Bastos

Personal details
- Born: 5 August 1901 Pelotas, Rio Grande do Sul, Brazil
- Died: 26 September 1964 (aged 63) Rio de Janeiro, Guanabara, Brazil

Military service
- Allegiance: Brazil
- Branch/service: Brazilian Army
- Rank: Army general
- Commands: 1st Military Region; 1st Army
- Battles/wars: World War II

Armando de Moraes Âncora (5 August 1901 – 26 September 1964) was a Brazilian military army general, who fought in World War II.

== Military career ==
Âncora had served as commander of the 1st Military Region from 1959 to 1960. Later, he had served as commander of the 1st Army (now the Eastern Military Command), during the 1964 coup d'état, from 1963 to 1964.

After finding out about the split in the army, Âncora chose to avoid armed conflict between coupist and pro-government troops who wanted to stop them.

In a meeting in Resende, Rio de Janeiro, Armando Âncora, who had just assumed office as interim Minister of War, replacing general Jair Dantas Ribeiro, declared the end of the resistance of the forces who gave protection to the government.

Besides commanding the 1st Army, general Âncora was head of the Federal District Police during the Rua Toneledo shooting in August 1954, which led to his resignation, before the suicide of Getúlio Vargas, being one of the few military personnel loyal to Vargas, along with general Manuel César de Góis Monteiro.

Military offices
Preceded by Nestor Souto de Oliveira	Commander of the 1st Military Region; 1959–1960	Succeeded by Joaquim Justino Alves Bastos
Preceded by Osvino Ferreira Alves	Commander of the 1st Army; 1963–1964	Succeeded by Octacílio Terra Ururahy
