= Caçapava =

Municipality in the state of São Paulo in Brazil

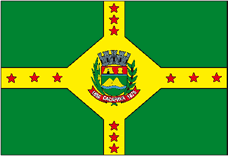
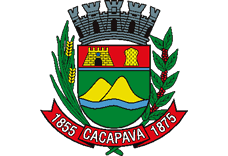
- Flag Coat of arms
- Motto: Mea autem Brasiliae magnitudo My greatness is also Brazil's
- Location in the state of São Paulo and Brazil

- Location within Brazil
- Coordinates: 23°06′03″S 45°42′25″W
- Country: Brazil
- Region: Southeast
- State: São Paulo
- Metropolitan Region: Vale do Paraíba e Litoral Norte

Government
  - Mayor: Yan Lopes (Podemos, 2025–2028)

Area
  - Total: 368.99 km^{2} (142.47 sq mi)

Population (2022 Census)
  - Total: 96,202
  - Estimate (2025): 100,071
  - Density: 260.72/km^{2} (675.25/sq mi)
- Time zone: UTC−3 (BRT)
- Area code: +55 12

Caçapava is a municipality in the state of São Paulo in Brazil. It is part of the Metropolitan Region of Vale do Paraíba e Litoral Norte. Is between São José dos Campos 24 km and Taubaté 19 km. The distance from Caçapava to São Paulo is 109 km and from Rio de Janeiro 263 km.

Caçapava has a military unit known as 12ª Brigada de Infantaria Leve, which is part of the national army force and is constantly ready to take part in national and international missions.

== Demographics ==
Historical population (municipality)
Year	Population	%±
1920	18,099
1940	16,352	−9.7%
1950	19,301	18.0%
1960	24,199	25.4%
1970	30,712	26.9%
1980	51,353	67.2%
1991	66,058	28.6%
2000	76,130	15.2%
2010	84,752	11.3%
2022	96,202	13.5%

== Media ==
In telecommunications, the city was served by Companhia de Telecomunicações do Estado de São Paulo until 1975, when it began to be served by Telecomunicações de São Paulo. In July 1998, this company was acquired by Telefónica, which adopted the Vivo brand in 2012.

The company is currently an operator of cell phones, fixed lines, internet (fiber optics/4G) and television (satellite and cable).

== Economy ==
The city has a reasonable industrial activity with important industries, like Nestlé and Pilkington, among others:

- ADEZAN Ind Com Embalagens e Serviços Ltda
- ALAMBIQUE do Antenor
- BLUETECH
- BRASQUÍMICA Produtos Asfalticos Ltda
- CABLETECH Ind. Com. de Condutores Elétricos
- CEA – Centro Empresarial Aeroespacial
- CEBRACE Cristal Plano Ltda
- Cerâmica BRUMATTI Ltda
- CORTESIA Serviços de Concretagem Ltda
- CPW Brasil Ltda
- DVR Power Centers
- FERNANDO D. Perez Belart
- FLC Ind e Com Plásticos Ltda
- Graúna Usinagem
- Grupo Antolim (Intertrim, Iramec, Trimtec)
- HUBNER Sanfonas Industriais Ltda
- INTRIERI Ind Com Ltda
- IPA (TI Automotives)
- ITALSPEED Automotive
- LEAR do Brasil Ind e Com de Interiores Automotivos
- Mecânica Caçapava Ltda
- Metal G Industrial
- MWL Brasil Rodas & Eixos Ltda
- N. PADOVANI Gomes & Cia Ltda
- OLGBER Especialidades Ltda
- PENIDO Construtora
- PREMOVALE
- REPROCESSA Resíduos Industriais Ltda
- ROSENBERGER Domex
- SIMOLDES Plásticos Ind Ltda
- SOTEF Soc. Técnica de Engenharia e Fundações Ltda
- STAR RACER Brasil Ltda
- TREVES DO BRASIL
- TW Espumas Ltda
- VALEPOSTE Ind Com Artefatos Cimento Ltda
- VIAPOL Ltda
- VORANA Usinagem e Com Ltda
- WOW Ind Com Ltda
- YUSHIRO do Brasil Ind Química Ltda

It is expected that there will be an increase in the city's industrial activity after the completion of the local airport. The airport, named Aerovale by its developers, will be privately owned and operated and will function mainly as a business and cargo hub for the region.

== Sister cities ==
Caçapava has only one Sister City, which is its namesake: Caçapava do Sul.

== See also ==
- List of municipalities in São Paulo
