= Operation Popeye (Brazil) =

Conflict in 1964 Brazilian coup d'état

- Part of the 1964 Brazilian coup d'état
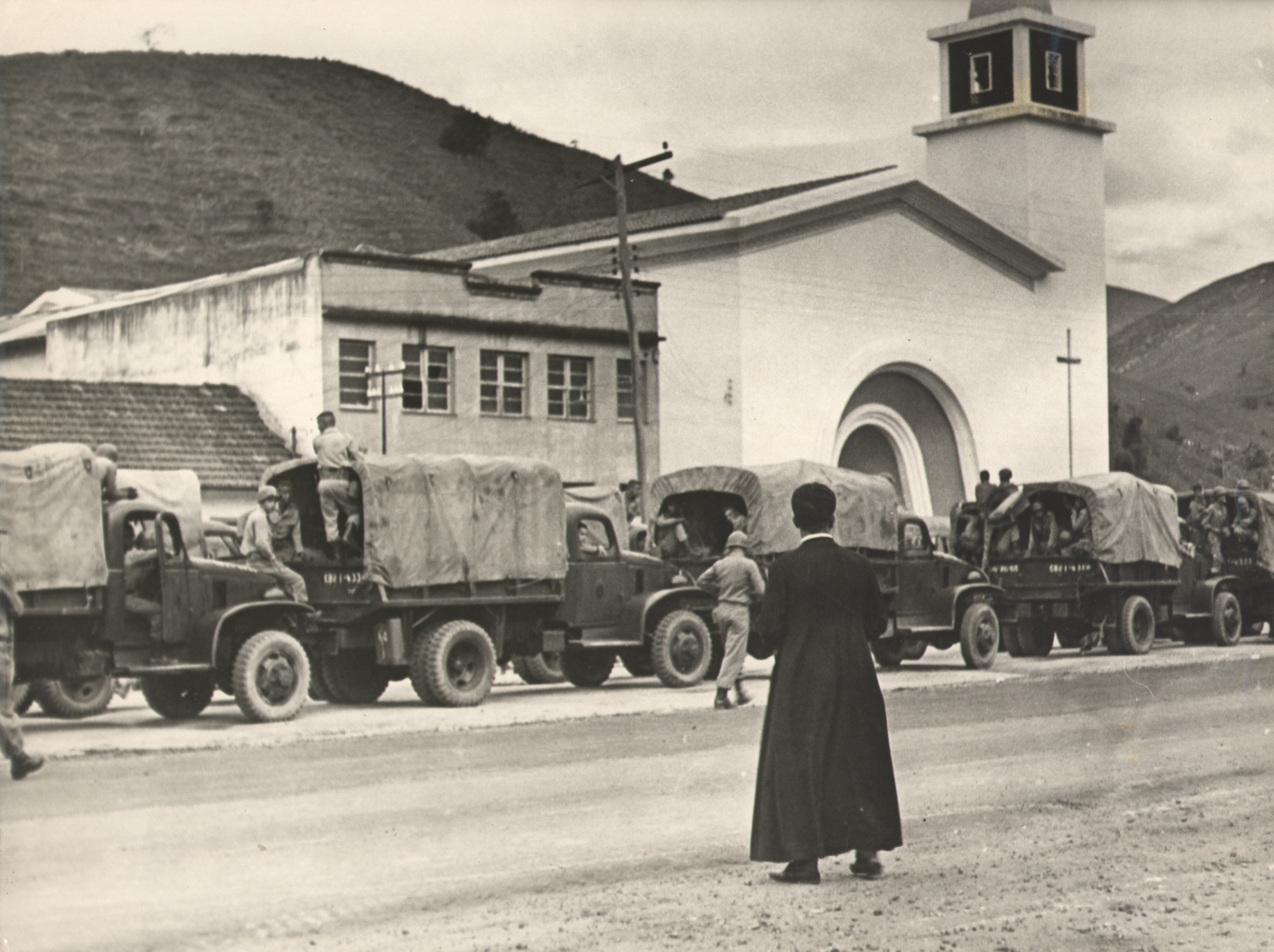
- The Minas Gerais column in Areal
Date	31 March – 2 April 1964
Location	Brazil
Result	Rebel victory

Belligerents
Rebels: Brazilian Army (rebel); Minas Gerais; Military Police	Loyalists: Brazilian Army

Commanders and leaders
Olímpio Mourão Filho; Antônio Carlos Muricy; Magalhães Pinto	Luís Tavares de Cunha Melo; Raimundo Ferreira; Kerensky Motta

Units involved
4th Infantry Division; Tiradentes Detachment	1st Infantry Division; 1st Battalion of Caçadores

Strength
At the beginning: 2,714 soldiers; 193 vehicles; At the end: 4–5,000 soldiers	5,000 soldiers; 300 men in the 1st BC; 200 vehicles in the 1st RI; 2,500 men in the 2nd RI

Operation Popeye was the advance of the Tiradentes and Caicó detachments of the Brazilian Army and the Military Police of Minas Gerais (PMMG), from Minas Gerais, to Rio de Janeiro and Brasília during the 1964 Brazilian coup d'état. Their rearguard was protected within Minas Gerais by operations Cage and Silence. Ordered by general Olímpio Mourão Filho, from the 4th Military Region/Infantry Division, it was the coup's first military offensive. The Tiradentes Detachment, whose command was given to general Antônio Carlos Muricy, faced loyalist forces from the 1st Army in Rio de Janeiro's territory, under the command of general Luís Tavares da Cunha Melo, from 31 March 1964. The operation was one of the factors behind president João Goulart's departure from Rio de Janeiro and the collapse of loyalist resistance in the city; when the detachments entered Guanabara and Brasília on 2 April, the federal government had already been defeated.

Since 1963, Mourão Filho had been conspiring in Minas Gerais against the federal government, allied to his subordinate, general Carlos Luís Guedes, governor Magalhães Pinto and the PMMG, which was prepared to fight as a conventional force. Guedes and Magalhães Pinto had a more defensive plan, reinforced by negotiations with Espírito Santo for access to the sea, from where they could receive American logistical support. Mourão deemed this to be impractical, as the Minas Gerais garrison was much weaker than that of Rio de Janeiro. His solution was a surprise attack, gathering units from Juiz de Fora at night, entering Guanabara at dawn, arresting the president and taking over the Ministry of War. This was what the operation consisted of, but the original plan was never used, as Mourão launched the coup in the early hours of 31 March. What happened next was the gathering of the rebel forces and their meeting with the loyalists in the interior of Rio de Janeiro over the course of two days.

The operation took place along the Union and Industry highway, with the most important events in the stretch between the Paraibuna river, on Minas Gerais' border with Rio de Janeiro, and the city of Areal. The forces of the loyalist "military apparatus" had a full numerical and firepower advantage, and their victory was likely when only considering the military dimension. Its orders were defensive, and Goulart did not want to use the Air Force, which could have been decisive. Muricy was counting on the political dimension for support. On 31 March, before the arrival of the loyalists, the rebels already had a bridgehead over the Paraibuna, in the town of Monte Serrat. At night they were confronted by forces from the 1st Battalion of Caçadores (1st BC), coming from Petrópolis, under lieutenant colonel Kerensky Túlio Motta. Kerensky was forced to retreat after two of his platoons joined the rebels around midnight. Then, at 05:00, the powerful 1st Infantry Regiment (1st RI, the Sampaio Regiment), which was supposed to mount a defense on the Paraíba do Sul river, in Três Rios, joined the Tiradentes Detachment. Três Rios, unprotected, was taken at 10:30. Cunha Melo commanded the last line of defense, the 2nd RI, ahead of Areal. The fight approached on the afternoon of 1 April, but the possibility of confrontation was interrupted by news that Cunha Melo's superior, Armando de Moraes Âncora, commander of the 1st Army, would negotiate in Resende. Cunha Melo negotiated with Muricy, ceasing resistance and allowing his passage to Rio de Janeiro.

The operation took place in parallel with the 2nd Army's participation in the coup, which advanced against the 1st Army in the Paraíba Valley, and the events in Rio de Janeiro, together leading to the president's departure and loss of authority in Southeastern Brazil. This occurred while the Tiradentes Detachment was still in the interior of Rio de Janeiro, and the Ministry of War was taken over by general Costa e Silva before Mourão's arrival in Rio de Janeiro, frustrating his ambitions. The confrontation between the opposing forces, who were on the ground in combat positions but did not actually fight, was feared by local residents and reported in the press at the time as the scene of a hypothetical civil war.

== Background ==
=== Protagonists of the Minas Gerais conspiracy ===
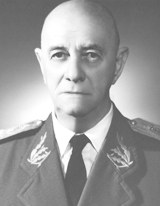
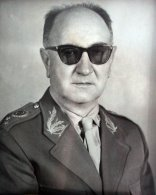
From left to right (top to bottom on mobile devices): Olímpio Mourão Filho, Carlos Luís Guedes and Magalhães Pinto

In May 1962, the Institute for Research and Social Studies (IPES), an organization committed to uniting opposition social sectors and weakening João Goulart's government, set up in Belo Horizonte, expanding beyond the Rio-São Paulo axis to Minas Gerais, another politically and economically relevant state. Meetings became frequent from July 1963 onwards. The IPES-MG board was made up only of businessmen, but the rest of the organization had "industrialists, intellectuals, journalists, academics, military officers, among others", including members of middle class. Among the army there were several "traditionalist" officers, that is, untrained by the Superior War School (ESG) and unaligned with the capitalist reorganization project defended by the IPES-IBAD (Brazilian Institute of Democratic Action)-ESG complex. However, they agreed in their opposition to the government. Colonel Dióscoro do Vale, commander of the 12th Infantry Regiment, was a representative of this group. Colonel José Geraldo de Oliveira, commander of the Polícia Militar de Minas Gerais (PMMG), was also a member of IPES-MG.

IPES-MG initially struggled to influence the officer corps. Their preferred high-ranking commander came to be brigade general Carlos Luís Guedes, sworn in as commander of the Divisional Infantry of the 4th Infantry Division (ID/4) in December 1961. Guedes was enticed through his General Staff, his contacts with civilians from IPES-MG and military contacts between the São Paulo and Rio de Janeiro IPES units and ID/4's command in Belo Horizonte. This was not ideal, as despite being a radical opponent of the president, Guedes did not share an ideology with the IPES/ESG group, but he was the available option. In January 1964, at the "Acaiaca Meeting", attended by Aluísio Aragão Villar, leader of IPES-MG, businessmen confirmed their material support for a coup and Guedes was designated the military leader of the conspiracy.

Hierarchically, Guedes, at the head of a Divisional Infantry, was not the highest authority in Minas Gerais, only commanded infantry units and was subordinate to a divisional command. In this case, it was the 4th Infantry Division (4th DI), based in Juiz de Fora, whose command was merged with that of the 4th Military Region (4th RM) and thus, also known as the 4th RM/DI. This hybrid situation existed in regions far from the border and of lower priority, that is, Juiz de Fora, Curitiba and Recife, in the 4th, 5th and 7th RM/DIs. The 4th RM/DI was subordinate to the 1st Army, in Rio de Janeiro.

In August 1963, Olímpio Mourão Filho, a "long-time conspirator and already known in Brazilian political and military circles", took over as Guedes' superior in the 4th RM/DI. By then he had already conspired against Goulart in the 3rd DI, in Santa Maria, Rio Grande do Sul, and in the 2nd RM, in São Paulo. Politically he was one of the "traditionalists". In São Paulo he had already drawn up plans equivalent to the Popeye, Cage and Silence operations he'd order in Minas Gerais.

As soon as he arrived, Mourão met with Guedes and governor José de Magalhães Pinto in September, explaining his intention to launch a "revolution" against the federal government. Both accepted the plan and Magalhães and Mourão respectively assumed civilian and military leadership of the conspiracy. Mourão's leadership was relative, as IPES-MG did not trust him, fearing his impetuosity, which could put the carefully planned conspiracy at risk. Furthermore, Mourão could get closer to governor Magalhães and general Costa e Silva, who diverged from the interests of the IPES/ESG group. Thus, Guedes acted to control him, interfering in his actions. Mourão realized this and felt hampered, believing that Guedes was hindering the "revolution". Mourão and Guedes hated each other. What IPES valued in Mourão was his value as "bait", attracting the attention of the federal government's intelligence service, and his anti-government agitation within the military. At the time, there was little conspiratorial mobilization among the military in Minas Gerais, although the social environment was suitable for its expansion.

Guedes stood on one pole of the conspiracy, and on the other, Magalhães and Mourão. The governor sought not the "class political agenda" of IPES, but his personal political ambitions, aiming to become president in the election scheduled for 1965. Mourão's military strength would be an asset that he could use in his power maneuvers. For Mourão, the governor's support conferred political legitimacy. The governor also controlled the state's Military Police, which was important for the balance of military strength, as will be seen later.

=== Minas Gerais' strengths and weaknesses ===
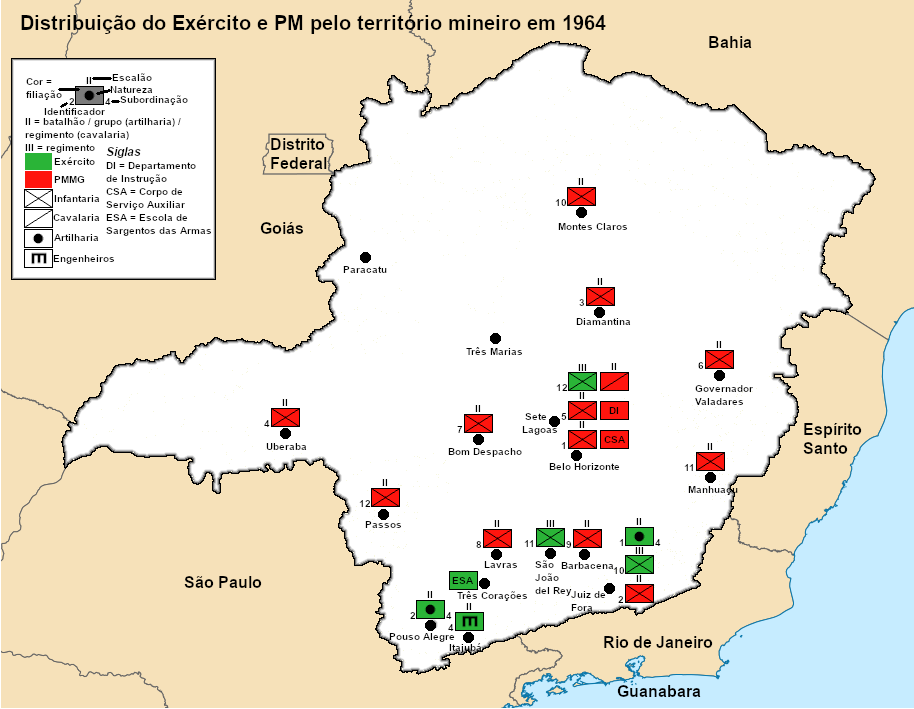
Location of army (green) and police (red) units in Minas Gerais

Number of soldiers of the 1st Army, 1964
(in Rio de Janeiro)
Direct control	4,639
1st RM	15,091
1st DI	7,381
DB	3,826
D Aet (Nu)	3,143
GUEs	7,783
(in Minas Gerais)
4th RM	1,741
4th DI	5,091

Minas Gerais was a convenient state for launching the coup due to the high cohesion between the generals (Mourão and Guedes) and the governor, guaranteeing the desired civilian political support. This cohesion extended to the Military Police and the Air Force. (Note: The Air Force had the Belo Horizonte Air Base Detachment and the Barbacena Aeronautical School in Minas Gerais. Silva 2014b, p. 327.) Mourão Filho, as the highest military authority in the state, found it simpler to conspire; in São Paulo, the 2nd Military Region and 2nd Infantry Division were separate commands, and Rio Grande do Sul was host to the 3rd Military Region and five different divisions, which required coordination between several generals. Minas Gerais' central position allowed communication with any region of the country, and there was a complete road network. Thus, offensively, Brasília and Rio de Janeiro were within reach — the latter was close to the HQ in Juiz de Fora, unlike São Paulo, 430 kilometers away, and Santa Maria, 1,600. Defensively, its mountainous terrain would be an advantage in armed resistance. In the event of a prolonged conflict, food supply was guaranteed by livestock farming in the north and agriculture in the south of the state.

Nevertheless, the federal government did not fear Guedes and Mourão. It knew that they were not reliable, but their combined strength was less than a fully trained regiment. The territory of Minas Gerais was home to only a tiny number of Armed Forces servicemen, especially the army, estimated at 4,000 men. Army statistics predicted for 1964 the service of 5,091 soldiers in the 4th DI and 1,741 in the 4th RM (which did not command combat units), out of a total of 48,965 in the 1st Army, the remainder of which were in Rio de Janeiro. (Note: 559 soldiers were in the 3rd Battalion of Caçadores, in Espírito Santo.) The few soldiers available consisted basically of reservists, with incomplete training of only three to four months a year. The local garrison was a bottom priority for materiel distribution: Minas Gerais was far from military dangers and, for the Brazilian Army, it was not a priority. The 4th RM/DI was used only as a source of resources, and its military commands were logistical, not operational.

Mourão Filho, discussing the weakness of the garrison, noted that:

The 105mm Howitzer Regiment only had two groups: (Note: The division should have had three groups at its disposal, but its artillery was incomplete. This situation was common in other divisions. Furthermore, each group should have had three batteries, but only had two. Pedrosa 2018, p. 113.) the ones in Juiz de Fora and Pouso Alegre. I had inspected the latter not many days before the beginning of the revolution and it was in very poor condition in terms of personnel, materiel and ammunition. The commanding general of the divisional artillery had organized a sui generis drill, placing posters with the denomination in the place where a unit fraction (Battery, Piece, etc.) should be. What real troops there were was almost nothing, compared to the amount of posters glued to stakes stuck in the ground. When I finished that ridiculous review, I jokingly told general Ivan Pires Ferreira that he, a brigade general, was the commander of two artillery groups, one of them made of cardboard.

Brazilian Army forces in Minas Gerais
4th Military Region/Infantry Division, Juiz de Fora
- Divisional Infantry, Belo Horizonte
  - 10th Infantry Regiment, Juiz de Fora (one battalion) (Note: Each regiment should have three battalions, but, not only in Minas Gerais, they were almost all incomplete. Each regiment, in turn, was supposed to have three companies of riflemen, but ended up having two. Pedrosa 2018, pp. 212–213.)
  - 11th Infantry Regiment, São João del-Rei (one battalion)
  - 12th Infantry Regiment, Belo Horizonte (two battalions)
- Divisional Artillery, Pouso Alegre
  - 4th 105mm Howitzer Regiment, Pouso Alegre
    - 1st Group, Juiz de Fora
    - 2nd Group, Pouso Alegre
- 4th Mechanized Reconnaissance Squadron, Juiz de Fora
- 200 soldiers in the Combatant NCO Academy, Três Corações
- 75 mm gun battery at the Reserve Officer Preparation Center (CPOR) in Belo Horizonte

Transferring personnel from other states to Minas Gerais in advance was not possible, as the government would notice. The incorporation of the Military Police was considered the solution to military weakness. Mourão, based on military weakness, argued against a defensive strategy, deeming a surprise attack with the few resources available as the only possibility, with the few resources available. According to Guedes' son Henrique, he asked his father how the 5,000 soldiers from Minas Gerais would defeat the more than 30,000 well-armed troops from Rio de Janeiro. Guedes replied it would be through new troops joining them; in 1930, Getúlio Vargas began his march without any force in the capital.

Another weakness was that Minas Gerais is a landlocked state, which prevented, in the case of a defensive war, the arrival of supplies from the sea; this was resolved through Espírito Santo.

=== Role of the Military Police ===
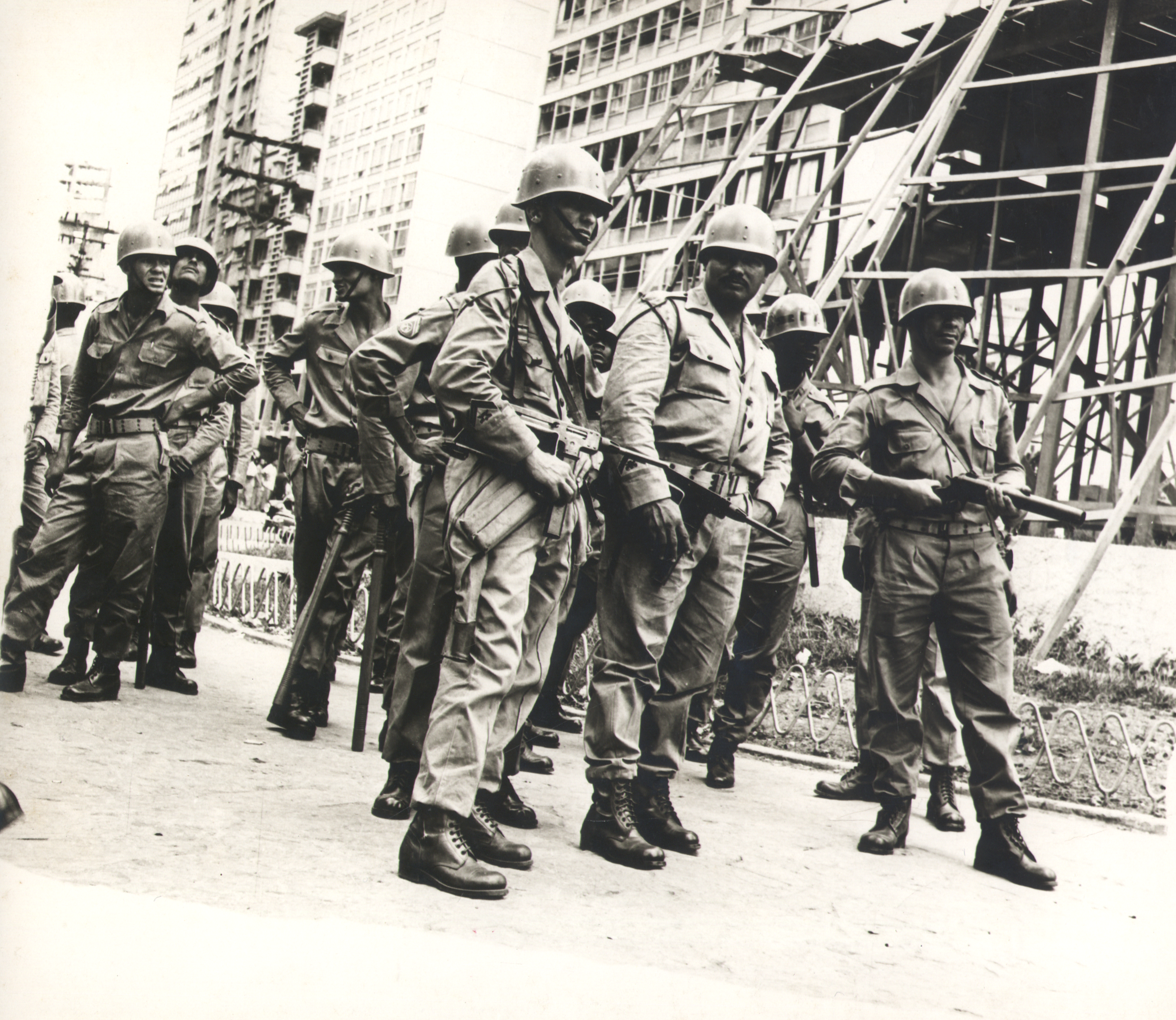
Minas Gerais military police

The Military Police leadership joined the conspiracy without difficulty. The police was subordinate to the state governor and obeyed his orders. At the same time, it was an auxiliary and reserve force for the army. It did not participate simply because of the command chain: its commander-general, José Geraldo, and his chief of staff, colonel Afonso Barsante dos Santos, were considered ultra-conservative and anti-communist and had personal connections with generals Guedes and Mourão. Their officers, like their counterparts in the Armed Forces, feared the breakdown of military discipline and hierarchy by lower ranks as seen in the Sailors' Revolt. José Geraldo and his predecessor, colonel José Meira Júnior, were part of IPES-MG, which established links between the two institutions — the army and Military Police. Work on rapprochement was carried out by Guedes and José Geraldo.

The idea was to swell the ranks of the rebel army with police officers, employing them as a fighting force in field campaigns. Historically, the function of the Public Forces, the old name for the Military Police, was precisely this, as a "state army" within the decentralized system of the First Brazilian Republic. The Public Force of Minas Gerais had a history of participating in conflicts in the 1920s and 30s. From the Vargas Era onwards, political centralization, weakened the military strength of the states, and the Public Forces turned to policing to the detriment of conventional war. The Military Police of Minas Gerais reversed this process in the early 1960s.

The number of Minas Gerais police troops grew from 11,376 in 1960 to 17,880 in 1964, and the governor would later admit the purpose was war. They had increased their weapons from army reserves (which, however, were also limited) and in workshops. They wielded mortars and "Mauser repeating rifles, 7mm caliber, INA model hand machine guns, forty-five caliber, the ZB model machine gun (known in the PMMG as FMZB) and Madsen machine guns, both in seven millimeter caliber". With the help of the army, public order had lost priority since 1962 to civil war and the fight against the internal enemy. Given the enemy's superiority, guerrilla warfare was an option, and military training specialized in defensive mountain warfare. In the event of a civil war, military police officers would have a psychological advantage over army soldiers. It would require violence against fellow citizens, which was already part of the police's profession, but not of the army's, which focused on external dangers.

Even with all these efforts, colonel Barsante still assessed that, when the movement was launched, the PMMG was not adequately equipped for a conflict against the 1st Army. Ammunition was scarce, and the weapons were obsolete and insufficient for the entire institution and the twenty thousand volunteers they intended to enlist. Upon assuming command of the military police as part of the Tiradentes Detachment, general Muricy deemed them incapable of lasting in a prolonged fight. As part of the detachment and also in the direction of Brasília, in Paracatu, the PMMG participated in the campaigns and almost engaged in battle. Its real combat capacity was never tested.

=== Roles of Espírito Santo and the United States ===
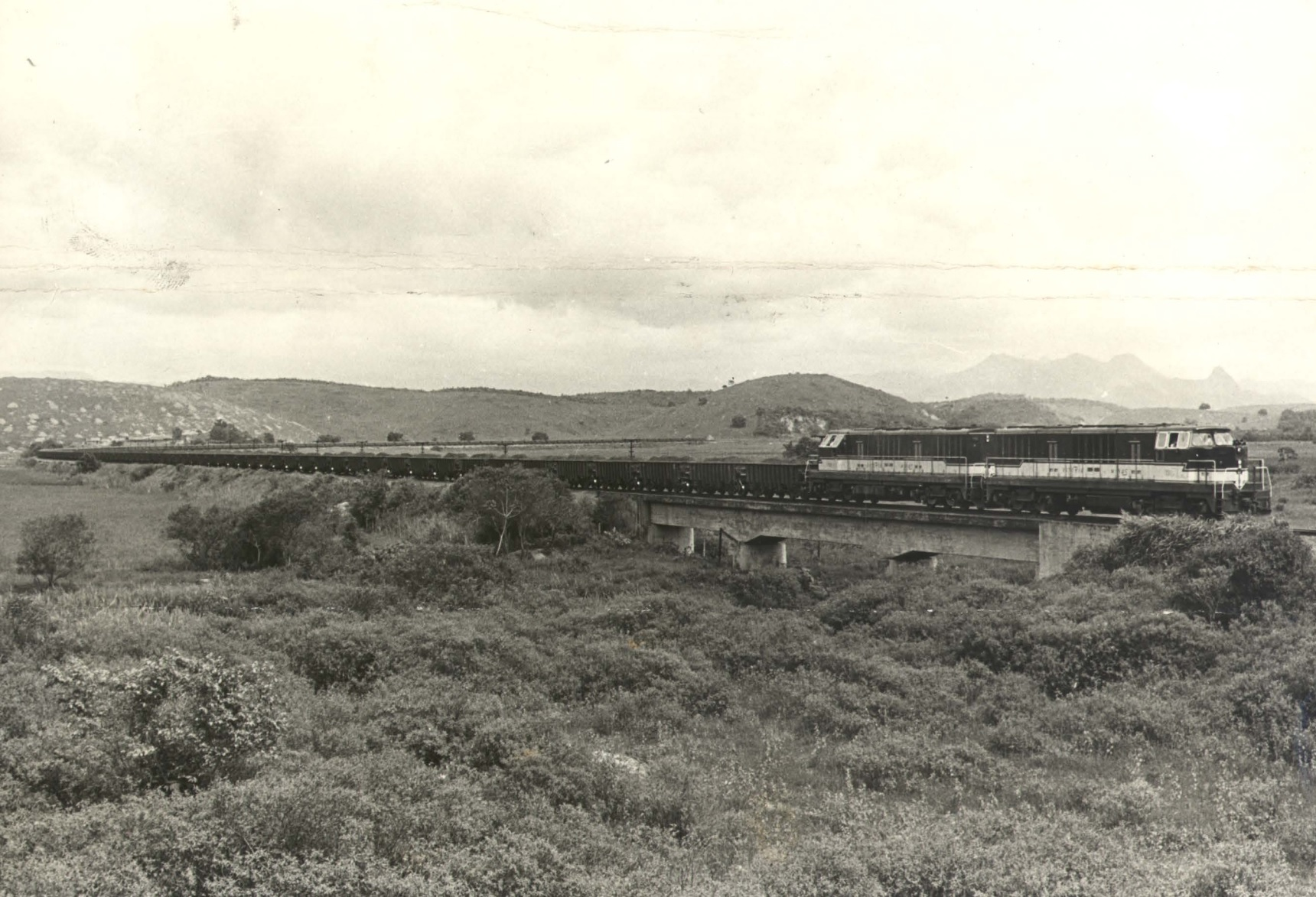
Vitória-Minas Railway (1968)

It was also necessary to ensure Minas Gerais' supply in case of a prolonged conflict, and to this end the Port of Vitória and the Vitória-Minas Railway were the logistical alternative through which weapons could come from abroad. Thus, since 1962 the state governments, their respective Military Police forces and representatives of the Armed Forces negotiated an alliance, confirmed in the last days of March 1964 by Francisco Lacerda de Aguiar, the governor of Espírito Santo. Aguiar was from the Brazilian Labor Party (PTB), the same as president Goulart, but political polarization was low in his state and he had good relations with both the federal government and the opposition. Believing that his state would be the first "syndicalist republic", his conservative profile prevailed over his government connections. The main reason for his joining may have been the fear of losing his position with a successful coup. The alliance with Magalhães Pinto was an asset for his militarily weak state, as Minas Gerais would provide troops and ammunition: the PMMG would remain on the border and, as soon as necessary, would defend the route to Vitória. External weapons could come from the United States, after recognition of a "state of belligerence" abroad and the legitimization of the action by the American government.

The situation in Espírito Santo was favorable, although the combat capacity of the Espírito Santo police at the time is unknown. In a war, Minas Gerais could mobilize 4 thousand men in the army, 18 thousand in the PMMG and 50 thousand volunteers, around 75 thousand in total. The federal government would have a force of 200,000 men. Even with the strengthening of the Military Police, military inferiority was not overcome, and the government would be able to crush a rebellion as long as it consisted only of Minas Gerais. If it did come, American support would take days to arrive, giving the enemy room to operate.

Other negotiations were made with Goiás and Mato Grosso, guaranteeing the rearguard.

== Planning ==
=== In the national context ===
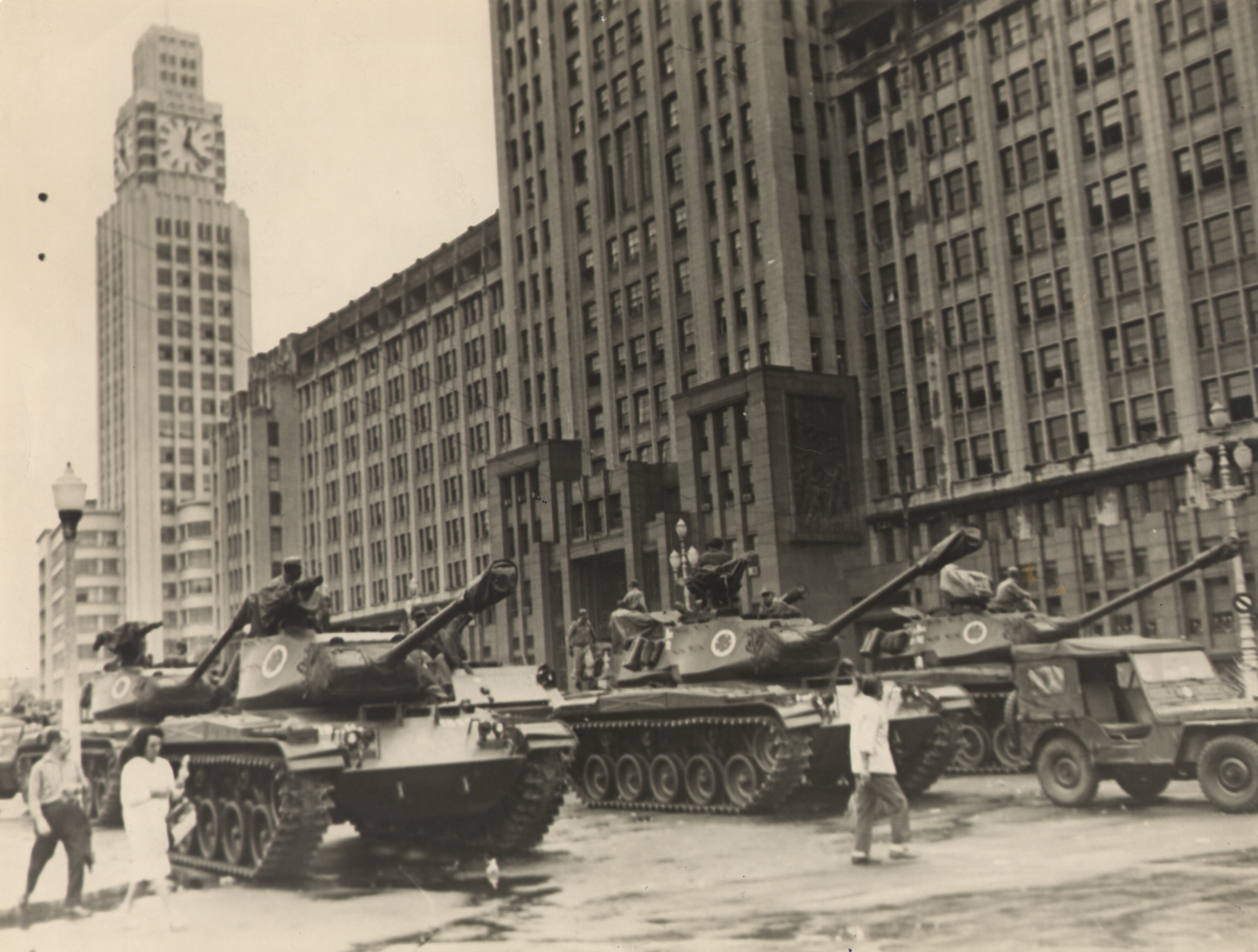
M41 Walker Bulldog tanks, representative of the 1st Army's strength, in front of its headquarters at Duque de Caxias Palace, Rio de Janeiro

The targets of the operation would be Brasília and Guanabara. Brasília hosted the National Congress, but was militarily irrelevant. Guanabara was home to the Ministry of War, under general Jair Dantas Ribeiro, the 1st Army, under general Armando de Moraes Âncora, and the strongest garrison in the country, especially the 1st Infantry Division, stationed in Vila Militar. All high command posts were in the hands of officers considered loyal to the government. There were also some of the most important conspirators, but without troop commands.

That's why it was necessary to start in Minas Gerais or São Paulo. Loyalist forces would be sent in reaction, but the lower-ranking officers would thus be far from their superiors in Guanabara and might not mount resistance. The territory of Rio de Janeiro would be invaded from Minas Gerais, by the 4th RM/DI, and from São Paulo, by the 2nd Army. (Note: CPDOC FGV 2001, CASTELO BRANCO, Humberto. "Originally conceived by Ulhoa Cintra in 1963, this plan envisaged that anti-Goulart troops from São Paulo and Minas Gerais would march to Rio, where the main commanders were loyal to the president".) In parallel with the advance against Rio de Janeiro, there would be operations against Brasília from Mato Grosso and Minas Gerais.

The conspirators in São Paulo and Rio de Janeiro did not intend to give leadership to Minas Gerais, aware of its military weakness. The early start in Minas Gerais was a decision taken without regard to the conspirators in São Paulo and Rio de Janeiro.

=== The defensive option ===
Mourão Filho wanted to enter Guanabara by surprise and quickly depose the government, but Guedes and Magalhães Pinto had their own plan, with a different approach: the Minas Gerais forces would arrive at the border with Rio de Janeiro and await the reaction of the 1st Army. If it was positive, they would continue, and if not, they would mount a defense on the BR-3 highway. Another nucleus of forces would be in Três Corações, monitoring the 2nd Army unit in Lorena, São Paulo. If the 2nd Army were against it, it would defend access to Belo Horizonte through the Verde or Grande rivers. If not, it would head to Brasília. Another defensive position, aimed at Brasília, would be in Três Marias. This idea, according to Mourão, would be to "surround Minas and negotiate".

In the case of a government reaction and defensive war in Minas Gerais, Espírito Santo would be used to receive logistical support from the United States. Guedes negotiated it with military attaché Vernon Walters and CIA agent Lawrence Laser, and Magalhães Pinto intended to send Afonso Arinos abroad to obtain recognition of the state of belligerence. Mourão heard about Espírito Santo from Magalhães, and wrote in his diary that "this smells bad to me". He was aware of the American role, including the possible approach of the U.S. Navy, as he admitted to journalist Hélio Silva.

Mourão's General Staff did not accept his "Popeye plan". According to major José Antônio Barbosa de Moraes,

There was a difference of opinion between us, on the General Staff, and general Mourão; we thought that the situation we would face would be very difficult; The most we could do would be to occupy positions on the heights of Minas Gerais and face whoever came against us and, at the same time, try to reach the Port of Vitória, to be in a position to receive any type of support, including foreign support. But general Mourão refused: "absolutely", as he considered the government's support scheme to be similar to a house of cards and that, at the first push, it would collapse.

=== The original plan ===
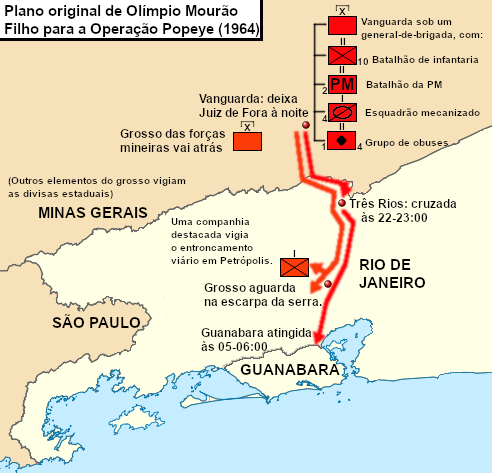
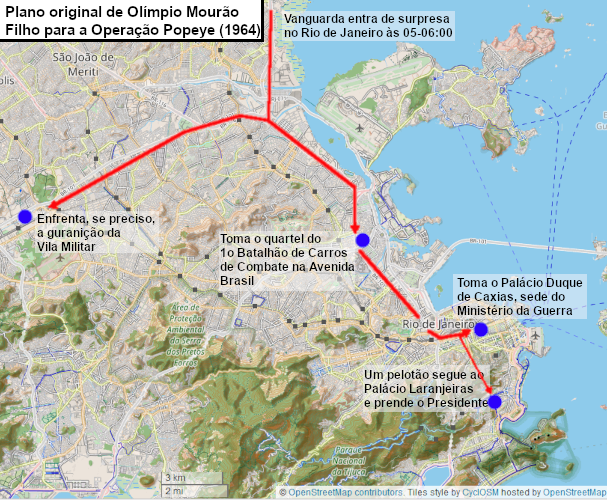
Operation plan from Juiz de Fora to Guanabara (left) and within Rio de Janeiro (right)

Guedes believed his "19-year-old soldiers" and "very poor material" would not be useful for a takeover operation. But for Mourão Filho, precisely because of this, an audacious surprise attack was the only option. Any force that stopped halfway would be destroyed. Minas Gerais, "with more holes than a sieve in its vast contour", was impossible to defend. Young soldiers only had the psychological capacity for a headlong advance, not a prolonged static defense. The historical precedent was the Constitutionalist Revolution of 1932, when São Paulo's troops stopped in Barra Mansa despite being met with a slow reaction and the opportunity to reach at least Barra do Piraí, which would have isolated Minas Gerais from Rio de Janeiro. "Time always works against rebel troops". The plans previously developed in São Paulo and Rio Grande do Sul already dictated there could be no stoppage. For Mourão, the defensive idea would result in total defeat, as its only chance would be with support in the 1st and 2nd Armies, but then it would be unnecessary to negotiate. Mourão thought that Guedes was reasoning just like at the General Staff School, where he learned operations in good material conditions.

In Mourão's plan, the forces from Juiz de Fora would leave at night — an infantry battalion and a police battalion, an artillery group and the Mechanized Reconnaissance Squadron. They would pass Três Rios, finding it unprotected, at 22-23:00 and reach Guanabara at 05-6:00 in the morning. The rest of the army and military police would follow, taking position on the edge of the mountains while a company would guard the intersection of roads to Petrópolis. In Guanabara, the vanguard, after taking over the 1st Tank Battalion (BCC) on Avenida Brasil, would invade the Army HQ, while a platoon would arrest the president at the Laranjeiras Palace, taking him to the HQ. Finally, the bulk of the detachment would go towards the Vila Militar to control the roads around the HQ or to invade it by surprise.

The seizure of power could be violent: "If we lose the war, many of us will die; I myself am absolutely determined to let myself be killed". It would be a "heroic" action, in which Mourão would be the undisputed leader; the operation's name itself referred to his pipe. It was expected to last less than 24 hours, after which "the rest would fall apart". IHis conclusion would be the issuance of a manifesto signed by the governors. Mourão would pick up Cordeiro de Farias at his home and give him the general command, while he would be in charge of the Forces in Operations. Ranieri Mazzili would assume the presidency of Brazil, while a military junta would reformulate the country's political system.

Mourão was confident, because "excluding higher commands, those troops were on the side of the revolution, and furthermore, it is the tradition of the Vila Militar not to fight there [in Rio]". After the coup, he would also discover that colonel Calderari, commander of the BCC on Avenida Brasil and his biggest concern, was in favor of the coup and would not resist. General Muricy would later question the success of such an operation, if it were carried out:

Thinking that one could leave Juiz de Fora with troops, at eight or ten o'clock at night without anyone knowing... entering Rio de Janeiro without anyone knowing... occupying the headquarters without anyone knowing... and then going inside saying: "I'm in revolt! I own Brazil!" ... And everyone replying: "He owns Brazil"... With all the Vila Militar troops ready to descend... that exercise would be finished, crushed, there wouldn’t be one left!

=== The choice for Muricy in command ===
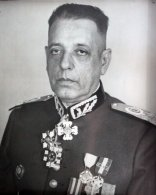
General Antônio Carlos Muricy

The detachment and the bulk of the troops would be under brigade generals, with the commander of the 4th RM/DI accompanying the detachment. Mourão had at his disposal, directly subordinate, two two-star generals: Ivan Pires Ferreira, in the Divisional Artillery (AD/4), and Guedes, in ID/4. The command rightfully belonged to Guedes, and handing it over to another two-star "imported" general from Rio de Janeiro was even an inversion of hierarchy. Such was the opinion of captain Carlos Alberto Guedes, major Brasiliano and other officers in Minas Gerais. Instead, Mourão found general Antônio Carlos Muricy in Rio, who agreed to command a "suicide mission" from Minas Gerais in December 1963. The intention was precisely to get rid of the "ghost of Guedes" and his strategy of waiting in defense and negotiating. He also openly distrusted general Ferreira.

Such was Mourão's repulsion that he was willing to promote lieutenant colonel Everaldo José da Silva, head of the 3rd section of the General Staff, to general and hand over command to him, but it would not be convenient to openly antagonize Guedes to such an extent. As other alternatives, he also thought about generals Fasheber and Bragança. Fasheber's problem would be that he was in the reserve, which created reluctance in the troops. To ensure that his idea would be implemented, Mourão thought of pretending to accept Guedes' plan, accompanying the detachment and forcing it to move beyond the state border.

== Beginning on 31 March ==
=== Outbreak ===
Mourão, Magalhães, Guedes and marshal Odílio Denys met at Juiz de Fora Airport on 28 March 1964 for the final preparations for the start of the coup. Mourão was unable to convince the others to implement Operation Popeye. In this final stretch, Mourão and Magalhães began to compete for leadership of the coup. It was only in the early hours of 31 March that it was activated, in conjunction with operations "Silence", the control of telecommunications, and "Cage", a series of arrests. However, for Mourão, "Operation Popeye was no longer possible, it had been overcome, because the beginning of the movement was in the early hours of the morning and not during the night". In the afternoon, it "was not completed and there is a terrible will against it". In his opinion, Magalhães had gone out of his way to prevent its execution.

Still, troops moved, both to Guanabara and Brasília. In the morning, general Castelo Branco called to prevent the movement, but it was not possible to go back. When asked by the 1st Army what was happening, Mourão lied that it was nothing.

Mourão faced waivering commanders on the 10th Infantry Regiment, in Juiz de Fora, and the Combatant NCO Acadeny, in Três Corações. After 08:00 or 09:00 in the morning (Note: Captain Mandarino, in Motta 2003, p. 177, Tomo 3, says 08:00. Mourão Filho 2011, p. 459 places what happened after 09:00.) the commander of the 10th RI, colonel Clóvis Galvão da Silveira, did not want to participate in the rebellion after discovering that, contrary to what he had been informed, it did not have the support of the Minister of War. The solution was simply to put him on vacation and hand over command to lieutenant colonel Everaldo José da Silva, from the General Staff of the 4th RM/DI. The other reluctant officers were the deputy commander, who was ordered to "go wherever he wanted and not disturb anything", and two colonels, (Note: Seccadio and Roberto Neves.) who stayed at home, "not intervening or disturbing". In the case of the school in Três Corações, its commander, colonel Peçanha, preferred to remain neutral. (Note: Motta 2003, p. 263, Tomo 3: "The ESA commander refused to cooperate, opting for an unjustifiable neutrality in the midst of a decisive fight for the country's destiny, telling him: "I command a school that, moreover, is in its first month of instruction; for this reason, I decided to consider this garrison as a green country". (...) When there is a neutral country, it is normally designated by the color green. So, when we want to designate a neighboring territory, which will not bother us, but will not give us any help, we try to represent it on the card with the color green".) Apart from these cases, the regional officer corps gave almost total support. There are mentions of the indisposition of sergeants in the 11th RI.

=== Vanguard occupies Paraibuna ===
Lieutenant colonel Everaldo ordered the commander of the infantry battalion of the 10th Infantry Regiment (10th RI), major Hindemburgo Coelho de Araújo, to move a vanguard and take possession of the bridge over the Paraibuna River, on the Rio de Janeiro/Minas Gerais border, and prevent the entry of forces from Rio de Janeiro. The vanguard was made up of the 2nd Company of Riflemen, under captain Ítalo Mandarino, plus machine gun and mortar elements from the Heavy Equipment Company and a fraction of the Mechanized Reconnaissance Squadron, whose vehicles left in flatbed trucks requisitioned in the city. The vanguard left around 10:00 and, approaching the objective, marched in combat formation, but found the bridge unprotected at 12-14:00, even though a loyalist force was expected there at 12:00 at the latest.

Mandarino set up his HQ at Paraibuna station and closed the highway and railway tunnel, informing the railway company that the transit of trains to Minas Gerais was interrupted. The mechanized squadron's tanks disembarked and took up positions taking advantage of the vegetation cover. Soldiers dug their individual shelters, with difficulty and without full protection due to the rocky terrain, and machine guns and mortars were in position. Two platoons and tanks were on the Rio de Janeiro side of the river, a little in front of the bridge on the outskirts of the town of Monte Serrat, and another platoon on the Minas Gerais side.

=== The Tiradentes detachment ===
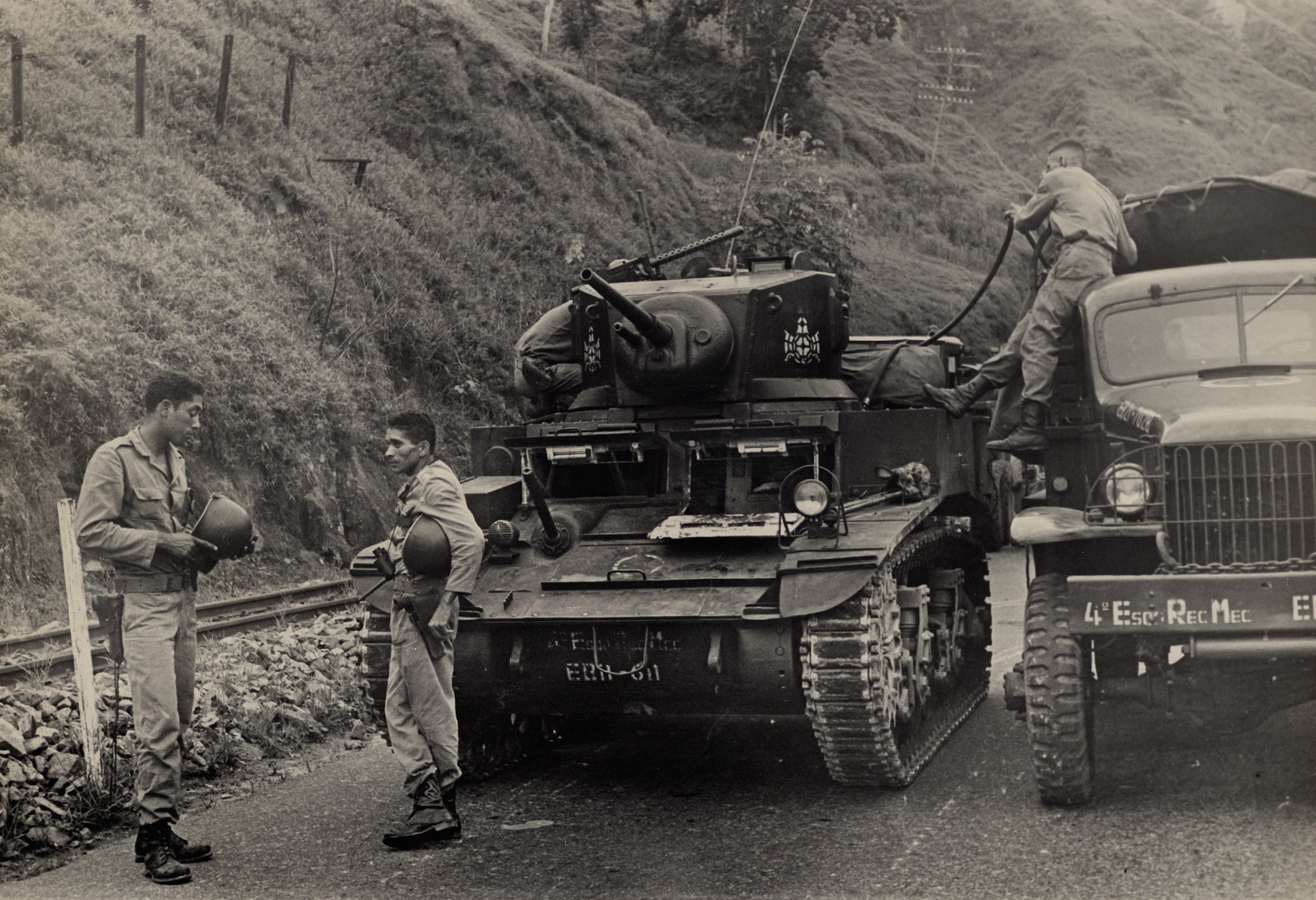
M3 Stuart of the Tiradentes Detachment

The 10th RI, from Juiz de Fora, the 11th from São João del-Rei and the 2nd Battalion of the 12th Infantry Regiment (2nd/12th RI), from Belo Horizonte, in addition to the 2nd and 9th PMMG infantry battalions, were assigned to the offensive towards Guanabara. (Note: The 5th Military Police battalion was originally part of the Tiradentes Detachment, but was transferred to the Belo Horizonte Detachment, as per Silva 2014b, p. 177.) There was also the 4th Mechanized Reconnaissance Squadron (4th Rec Mec Esqd), with light armor, the 1st Group of the 4th 105mm Howitzer Regiment (1st/4th RO 105), and logistical contingents.

The 10th and 11th RIs only had one battalion each. The army in Minas Gerais only had four infantry battalions, three of which were committed to this campaign, leaving the 1st/12th RI behind in Belo Horizonte, from where it would be used towards Brasília. The 10th RI moved in Studio B-42 trucks and buses provided by transport entrepreneur José Mansur, who also provided food. The 11th RI arrived in Juiz de Fora at 16:00–18:00. For transportation, civilian buses were used, plus four half-ton vehicles from the Maintenance Company for the anti-tank guns and civilian trucks for supplies; the low level of motorization of the 4th RM/DI had to be resolved "on the spot". The 2nd Battalion of the 12th RI only left Belo Horizonte after noon. It took a while and only arrived at 22:00, without automatic and collective weapons, subsistence supplies and money, with empty tanks, unprepared for the war that it headed towards. It could only be incorporated into the detachment at dawn, after receiving machine guns, mortars and ammunition from the Regional Armaments Depot, where they were still filled with grease, and 5 days worth of supplies. Mourão Filho thought about the incompetence of Guedes and Dióscoro do Vale, commander of the 12th RI, or even sabotage by both.

Together they formed the "Tiradentes detachment", under the command of general Muricy, who came from Rio de Janeiro in the morning. It was a group focused on a specific, provisional purpose, which would be dissolved at the end of the mission. The name was a tribute to its Minas Gerais origin, in allusion to José Joaquim da Silva Xavier.

At midday the 1st/4th RO 105 went into marching order blocked the highway in the Benfica region. At 12:30 the 10th RI began its movement along the Union and Industry highway towards Paraibuna. At the same time, the 2nd battalion of the PMMG sent a company under captain Namir Gonçalves de Lima in the direction of Porto Novo da Cunha, near Além Paraíba. Muricy noted the presence of two police battalions on the Além Paraíba road.

=== The loyalist force ===
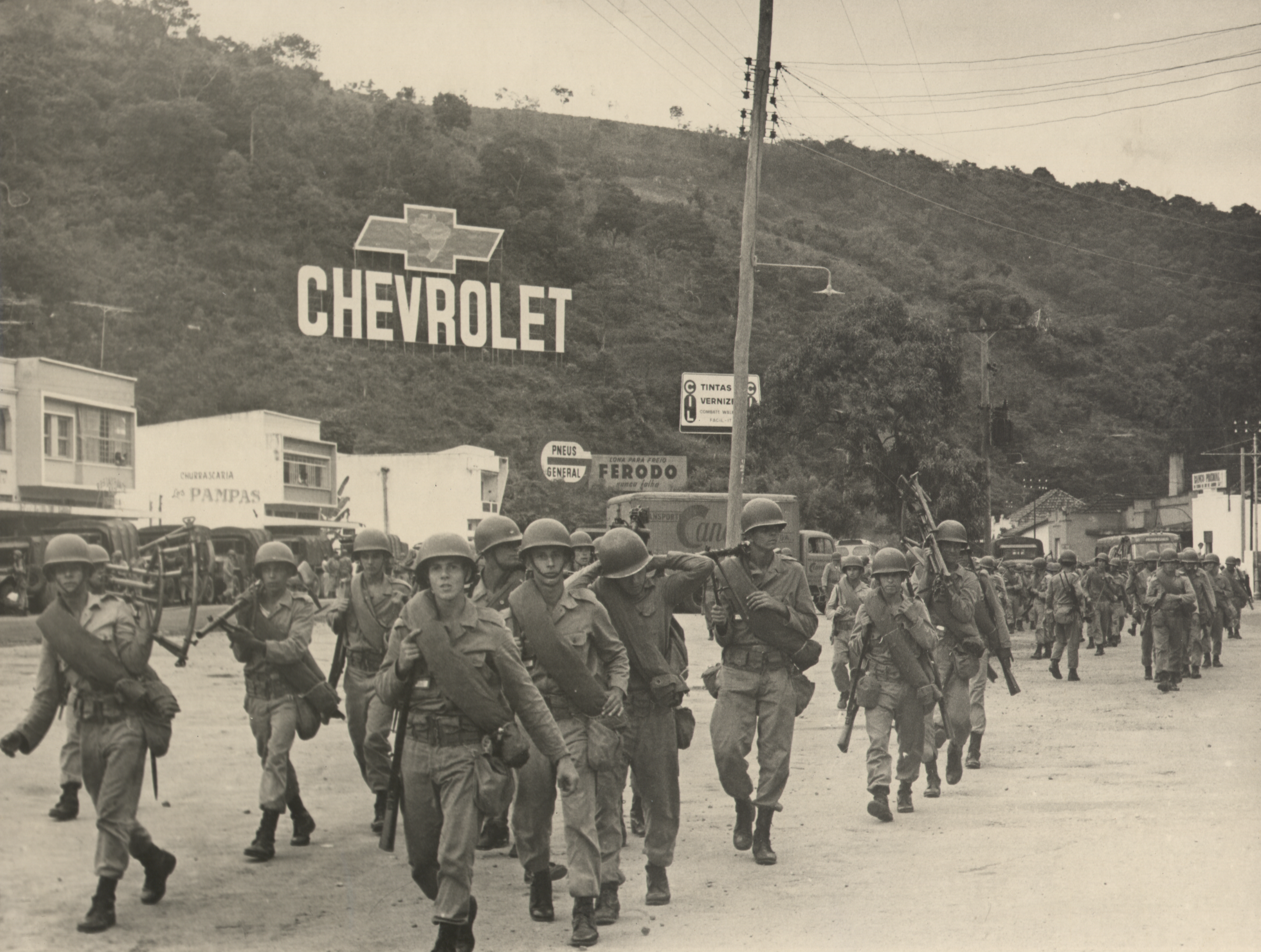
The 2nd Infantry Regiment

The federal government announced it was sending of forces from the 1st Army to quell the rebellion in Minas Gerais. At night, the population of Petrópolis saw lieutenant colonel Kerensky Túlio Mota's 1st Battalion of Caçadores parade through the streets; Kerensky was a loyalist, described by Muricy as "completely trusted by the government". Halfway between Guanabara and the border with Minas Gerais, it was the closest force and the first that could face Mourão Filho's troops. They continued towards Entre Rios (Três Rios) in buses requested from Viação Única. This movement became known to the coup plotters after noon.

In Guanabara and on the other side of the bay were the three Infantry Regiments (1st, the "Sampaio", 2nd, the "Avaí", and 3rd, the "Ararigboia") and the 1st Howitzer Regiment ("Floriano"), with two groups, from the 1st Infantry Division. General Cunha Melo, from the Divisional Infantry of the 1st Infantry Division, loyal to the government and theoretically the replacement for Mourão Filho in the 4th RM/DI after his dismissal declared by the government, was summoned in the afternoon. Armando de Moraes Âncora, commander of the 1st Army, informed him of the rebellion and tasked him with leading the forces that would face the Tiradentes Detachment. He had at his disposal his division's infantry and artillery, a platoon from the 1st company of the Engineering School-Battalion and tanks. The engineers were replaced by those from the 1st Engineering Battalion, organic to the 1st DI, and the tanks were removed to be able to react to a possible displacement of the 2nd Army.

On Avenida Brasil, 25 vehicles were seen towing howitzers and 22 with infantry. It was the vanguard of Cunha Melo's forces, colonel Raimundo Ferreira de Souza's 1st RI accompanied by the 2nd Group of the Floriano Regiment, with its Command, Services and 4th and 6th Howitzer Batteries. They left heading north at 12:00 or 18:00. According to captain Audir Santos Maciel, commander of the 6th Battery, the 2nd Group had spent the day isolated in the barracks, without news of the situation, and continued with the information that they would face an uprising by the Military Police of Minas Gerais — "they tricked us into leaving". (Note: Ustra 2007, p. 90, says the time at 18:00, based on Motta 2003, p. 145, Tomo 11, in which the then captain Maciel states "We left Vila Militar at dusk, around 18:00 approximately". Silva 2014b, p. 184, mentions the train at noon, quoting Elio Gaspari.)

== The conflict's setting ==
=== Order of battle ===
Order of battle in the theater of operations on the Rio–Juiz de Fora road
Rebels	Loyalists
4th Infantry Division Divisional general Olímpio Mourão Filho: Tiradentes Detachment Brigade general Antônio Carlos da Silva Muricy; 10th Infantry Regiment Lieutenant colonel Everaldo José da Silva; 11th Infantry Regiment Colonel Osvaldo Ferraro de Carvalho; 2nd Battalion of the 12th Infantry Regiment Major Carlos de Oliveira Pinto; 1st Group of the 4th 105mm Howitzer Regiment Lieutenant colonel Elias Jaber (Note: The commander of the 4th RO 105 was colonel Paulo Hildebrando de Campos Goés, see Motta 2003, p. 210, Tomo 10); 4th Mechanized Reconnaissance Squadron Lieutenant Elbem Souza Braga; 4th Light Maintenance Company Lieutenant José Gobbo Ferreira; 4th Quartermaster Company; 2nd Battalion of the PMMG (from Juiz de Fora) Colonel Antônio de Pádua Galvão; 5th Battalion of the PMMG (from Belo Horizonte); 9th Battalion of the PMMG (from Barbacena)	1st Army Army general Armando de Moraes Âncora: 1st Battalion of Caçadores Lieutenant colonel Kerensky Túlio Motta; Forces of the 1st DI under brigade general Luís Tavares da Cunha Melo, from his Divisional Infantry; Vanguard; 1st Infantry Regiment Colonel Raimundo Ferreira de Souza; 2nd Group of the 1st 105mm Howitzer Regiment Lieutenant colonel Raimundo Nonato; 4th Howitzer Battery Captain Gualberto Pinheiro; 6th Howitzer Battery Captain Audir Santos Maciel; Rearguard; 2nd Infantry Regiment Colonel Antônio Tavares de Sousa (Note: CPDOC FGV 2001, MONTEIRO, Dilermando. "On 2 April 1964, with the situation practically controlled by the insurgent forces, Dilermando Monteiro assumed command of the 2nd RI, replacing colonel Antônio Tavares de Sousa, who had remained faithful to the Goulart government".); 3rd Infantry Regiment; 1st Group of the 1st 105mm Howitzer Regiment Colonel Mello; Company of the 1st Engineering Battalion (Note: It was not the 1st Company of captain Hiran Gomes Cavalcanti, a witness in Motta 2003, p. 263, Tomo 6.) Captain Almir Taranto de Mendonça

=== Goals ===
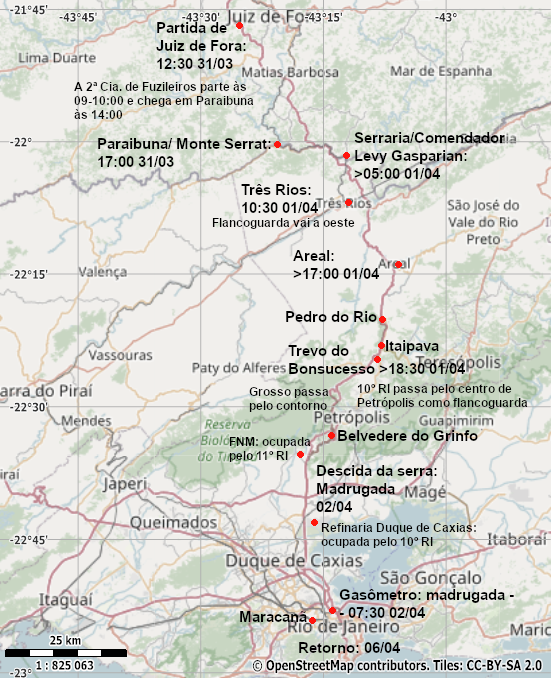
Trajectory of the Tiradentes Detachment

According to Mourão, at the meeting on 28 March, the available operations plan was to "reach the state limit line along the Paraibuna, in conditions to continue". Guedes told Castelo Branco that they would stop at the border and wait for the 1st Army troops to position themselves. According to Muricy, the written order was to "enclose themselves around Minas Gerais". "Those two extreme concepts then came to the fore: that of Mourão, which no one accepted - the general staff itself vetoed it - and that of Guedes". He and the other officers then thought of a middle ground: advance as much as possible within the state of Rio de Janeiro, arriving in a first phase at Paraibuna, and in a second phase, at Belvedere do Grinfo, in Petrópolis, or at Fábrica Nacional de Motores, in Duque de Caxias. This way, they would avoid being blocked in the defensive terrain of the border, they would be in a better position to make connections with São Paulo and Espírito Santo and they would increase the isolation of Northeastern Brazil in relation to the South. The final target of the operation would be the Army HQ (Duque de Caxias Palace) in Rio de Janeiro.

Cunha Melo, confident of the legalist victory, even told his General Staff: "Quickly prepare your units, because tomorrow we will have lunch in Juiz de Fora". Âncora was willing to invade Minas Gerais' territory, but received the more limited mission of blocking the progression of the troops that came from there; president Goulart did not give the order to attack. (Note: Villa 2004: "Optimistic, only the headlines from Ultima Hora: "Government troops on the border with Minas", "Jango: the coup is doomed"; "Jair’s order is total surrender"; "CGT declared a general strike across the country"; "Jair: energy against the rebels". But the reality was very different from that portrayed on the front page of Samuel Wainer's newspaper: the rebels advanced and the government collapsed. Jango, at no time, ordered an attack on the rebels in Minas Gerais, neither by land nor by air".)

Colonel Raimundo had orders to entrench the 1st RI in Três Rios. The Paraíba do Sul River passed there, which was a major obstacle. As for Kerensky, the assessment was that his role would be to withdraw without firing the first shot, delaying the advance of the Tiradentes Detachment and allowing the Sampaio Regiment to establish defensive positions on the river. His battalion was not much of a concern for the rebels, who saw the force coming from Guanabara as their main opponent.

=== Comparison of forces and role of the Brazilian Air Force ===
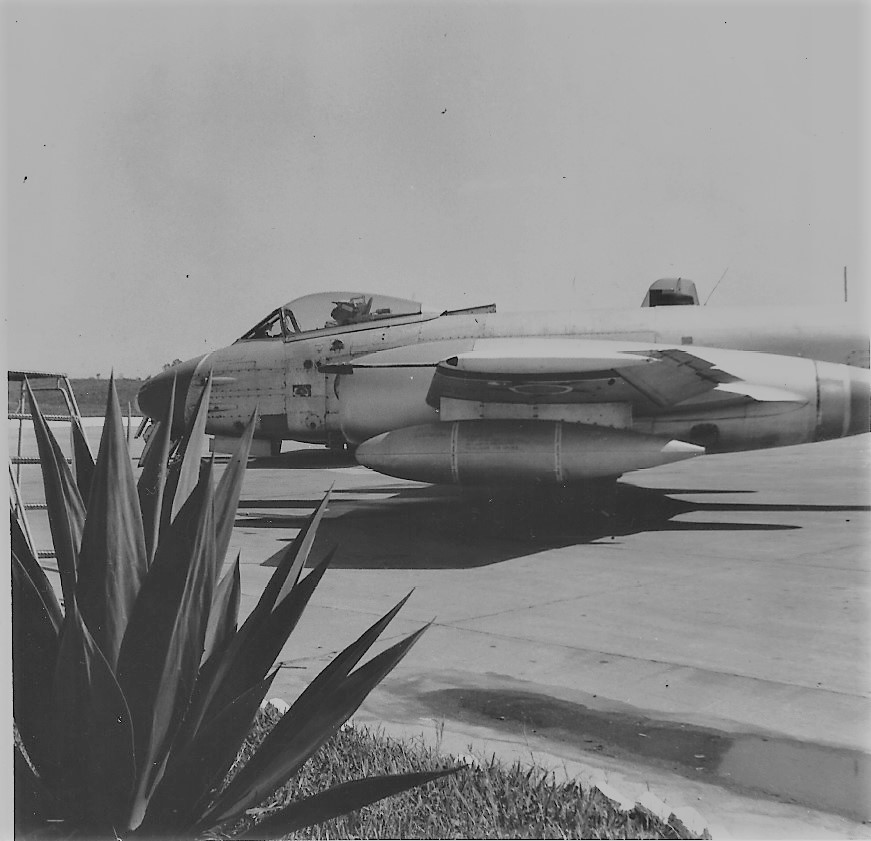
Brazilian Air Force Gloster Meteor/F-8

Mourão Filho was "floating without any support and expecting an attack from the troops that were ascending the mountain". At the time, the following scenario was conceived:

"Operation Popeye" (...) had everything it needed to become a true spectacle of civil war, with its unwanted realism of destruction and blood. (...) The mountainous contour, comprising an abundance of trenches and natural refuges, offered very special conditions for a harsh campaign, fought inch by inch. And to complete the realistic picture, the decor of the catastrophe, the opposing troops physically confronted each other, cocked their weapons and were ready to fire the first shot.

To fight this campaign, Muricy had only a few hours worth of ammunition and a force made up more than half by poorly trained conscripts. His only regiment with a full year of instruction, and therefore the best, was the 11th. The PMMG battalions, despite militarization efforts, were still a force appropriate only for the urban environment. In the field they would only be used for short actions and wouldn't last in combat.

Darcy Ribeiro would later write that Mourão Filho's troops "would run home if they were licked by some machine guns from aviation loyal to the government". According to aviator colonel Rui Moreira Lima, commander of the Santa Cruz Air Base, an air attack on a column like the one coming from Minas Gerais would be easy: if shot in the forehead and tail, even without suffering casualties, it would disintegrate with the plane's passage. However, Goulart did not order any offensive operations to the Brazilian Air Force. According to Carlos Chagas, Aeronautics Minister Anísio Botelho suggested bombing Mourão's troops with napalm, and Goulart's response was "Are you going to burn people? No way".

The aviator colonel reported having received an order from the Security Council to fly over the column, "one pass is enough", but he refused due to the command chain: he would need to hear it from the Air Zone commander. He was a loyalist and had four F-8 jets ready, but he never used them. If they tried to take off, his problems would be the mountainous terrain, the weather, which did not allow for an immediate departure, and the scarcity of loyalist pilots.

But even without air support, the loyalists had superior firepower, which should have been able to push Muricy back to Juiz de Fora. According to Carlos Chagas, they had 5,000 men, compared to the 4,000 rebels. The official report of the Tiradentes Detachment recorded only 2,714 men in its ranks. Thus, the loyalist officers were convinced that they would win the battle. The 1st RI, in particular, was recognized as one of the best infantry units in the Brazilian Army, both in professionalism and weapons.

At a complete disadvantage, Muricy, on the border, initially looked for defensive positions from which to resist. His hope was in his opponent's support — "I lived through the revolutions of 1930 and 1932 and I knew what undecided people are like". He knew that the majority of the military sympathized with his side, but were attached to legality. In the first 48 hours of the confrontation, the situation would be undefined, allowing them to be convinced to pick a side; therefore, in this short period it was necessary to "step up the game and call as many supporters as possible". The advance into the state of Rio de Janeiro itself was a way of gaining support; "in this time of indecision, you can do the devil and the more devil you do, the better".

== Paraibuna: confrontation with the 1st BC ==
=== Defensive position in Monte Serrat ===
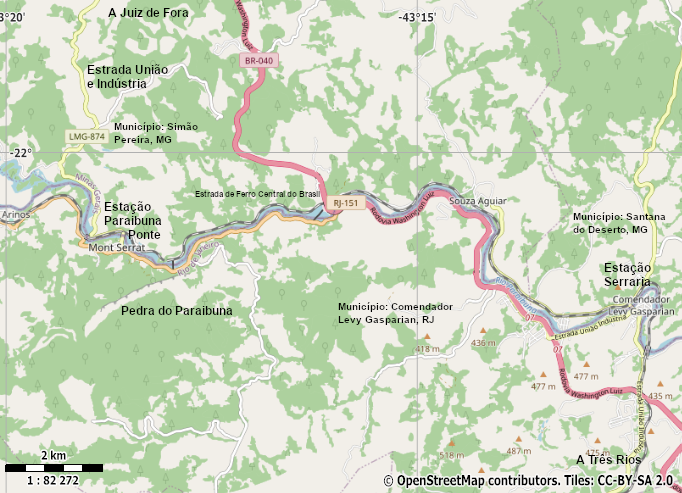
Map: Paraibuna region

At 17–18:00 the bulk of the Tiradentes Detachment arrived at the Paraibuna railway station. Just ahead, demarcating the border with the state of Rio de Janeiro, is the Paraibuna River, not very wide, but interrupted by rapids and, at the time, with a lot of water. On the other side of the bridge is the town of Monte Serrat, in the state of Rio de Janeiro. Further south is the imposing Paraibuna Rock. On the road on the Rio side, behind a stream, there was a platoon at the furthest extent of the 2nd Riflemen Company. The region is conducive to defense. The bridge is very narrow, and as Muricy remarked, "It is a mandatory crossing there. If I stayed there I wouldn't go any further". Explosives were planted to detonate it and prevent an enemy advance, and to mount a defense it would be enough to remain on the Minas Gerais side. As the objective was to advance, the fact of the force being a little further on the Rio side was important, and the situation was a bridgehead. The idea was to move forward on the morning of 1 April, after the arrival of the 11th RI and 2nd/12th RI, expected for the night.

According to captain Mandarino, civilians and reserve military personnel arrived from Rio wanting to join, and all drivers crossing the road were asked about the forces coming from the other side. Some Ultima Hora reporters were detained in Monte Serrat and released under safe conduct, managing to reach Juiz de Fora. With little information, the local population was greatly surprised and afraid of war with the arrival of thousands of soldiers in a village of just one hundred inhabitants. They were prohibited from leaving their homes and commercial establishments and the gas station were taken over. A PTB sympathizer was arrested and detained for 14 days in Juiz de Fora. Muricy stayed at the HQ in Juiz de Fora until 19:00 and at 20:00 he went to Paraibuna station, installing his command at the railway station before 21:00. He was "completely in the dark" there, with no news from Rio, São Paulo or the country. The local station broadcast only patriotic anthems.

=== Meeting with Kerensky ===
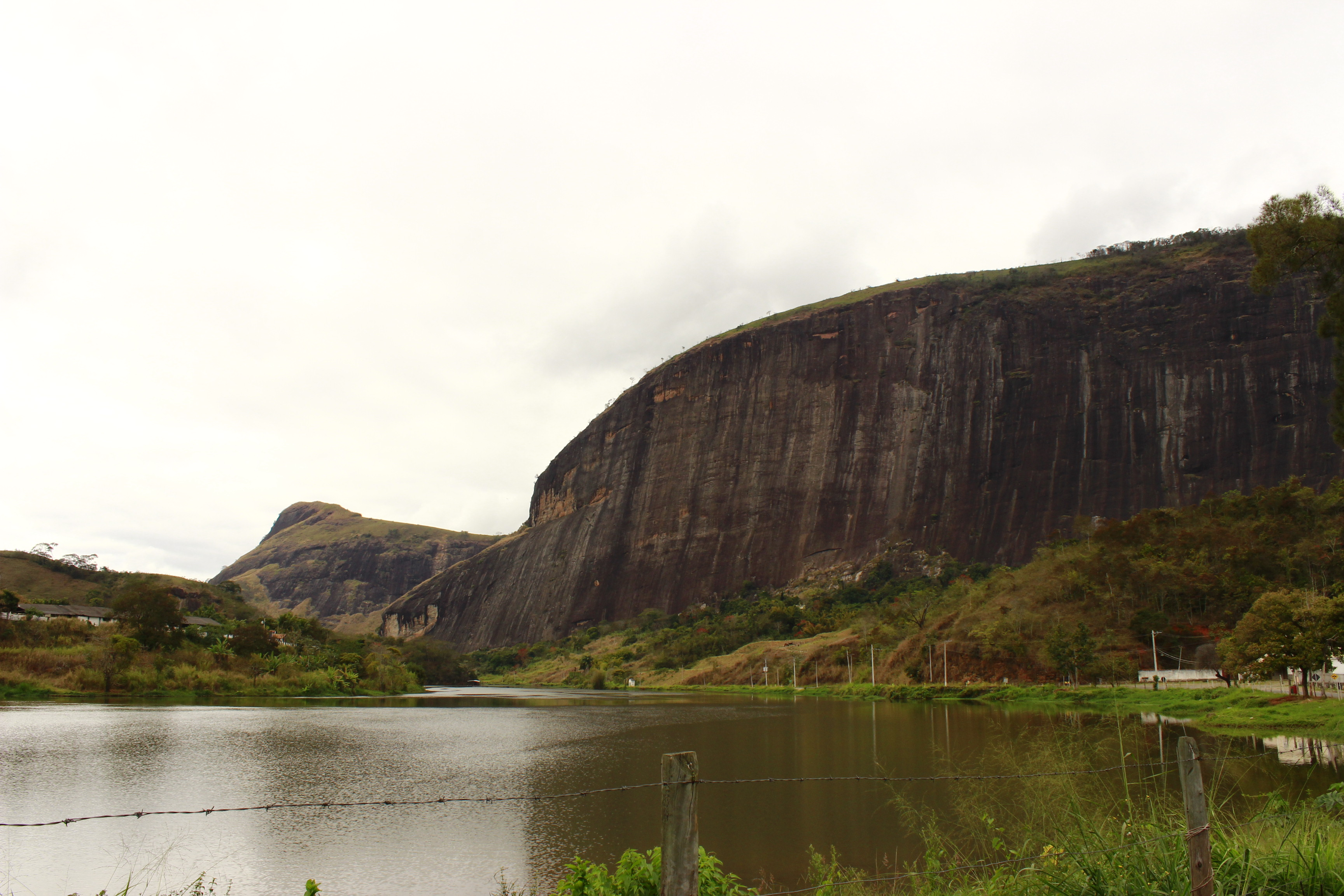
Terrain in Monte Serrat

At 18:00, patrols from the 10th RI spotted the first elements of the 1st BC. At 22:00, (Note: Mourão Filho 2011, footnote 90, p. 530, gives the time as 20:00.) the company was already "at heels", facing the detachment with 300 soldiers on the Rio de Janeiro side of the border, under the large stone wall.

The "saliva war" ensued: called around 22:00, Mourão went to the Paraibuna station with Muricy in order to speak with Kerensky. Captain Mandarino narrated what happened in the following terms:

General Mourão realized that lieutenant colonel Kerensky really wanted to gain time [for the arrival of the Cunha Mello Detachment] and, as a result, told him that he would have two hours to open the access road and, in front of him, gave the order to our artillery to immediately go into position and be in condition to, upon order, attack the BC's position, in support of the infantry in the first echelon, which was my company.

Still according to Mandarino, with the existing shelters, dug with difficulty in the rocky terrain, and the proximity of the enemy, his company would not be safe if the artillery opened fire. In fact the intention was not to use artillery, but to put psychological pressure on Kerensky and his battalion.

Meanwhile, Muricy planned a dash: at sunrise, the artillery would fire two shots at the quarry to warn the enemy that he was moving forward and that, to avoid bloodshed, it could join him or get out of the way. The 10th RI would advance quickly, while the 11th RI, reinforced by light tanks from the 4th Esqd Rec Mec, would engage in an enveloping action, following a road from Além Paraíba to Areal and from there either heading to Petrópolis or attacking the 1st BC from the rear. Mandarino noted the command's impatience with the passage blocked by the 1st BC and the possibility of advancing, already having 81 mm and 60 mm mortars and M3 A1 light tanks ready. Since 20:30 the 1st/4th RO 105 was in a position to open fire, and the 1st Section of its 2nd Howitzer Battery was on an anti-tank mission on the bridge.

=== The platoons desertion ===
Kerensky was not the only one from his battalion who, crossing the lines, met the opposing commanders. At the forefront of the Petrópolis forces was the riflemen platoon of second lieutenant Hélio Seabra Monteiro de Barros. Talking to Muricy and Mourão, he promised to return to his lines and bring his companions with him. Thus, two platoons of the 1st BC defected to the Tiradentes Detachment around midnight to 01:00 and were incorporated into the 10th RI.

The official report cited the actions of the Fassheber brothers (lieutenant and captain), who went to indoctrinate the troops of the 1st BC, and furthermore, that this unit was already ideologically aligned and capable of being influenced. According to captain Mandarino, "the lieutenant followed orders, but he was not at all motivated to defend the cause of that government". First lieutenant Reynaldo de Biasi, who commanded a platoon of the 2nd company right on the line of contact, remembered talking to and convincing Monteiro de Barros himself. (Note: The report "Março 64: mobilização da audácia" by José Stacchini in Estado de São Paulo, from 1965, also mentions a company that had already received orders to attack by overflow, after 70 minutes between the order and the desertion of the platoons.)

As the firing line had a maximum of 5 platoons, the desertion of 2 seriously weakened the loyalist position. Furthermore, most of the rest of the battalion's officers also wanted to join the rebels. Cornered, Kerensky retreated to Serraria, unguarding the path. Muricy suspended the operation, deciding only, at dawn, to fire a cannonade into the quarry and advance at maximum speed. First lieutenant Biasi remembered that, "when dawn came, we realized that the troops of the 1st BC had disappeared, no one else was in front of the wall".

== Serraria: desertion of the 1st RI ==
=== The regiment's reception ===
Mourão Filho returned to Juiz de Fora where, at 2:00 on 1 April, he called general Amaury Kruel and found out that the 2nd Army was marching from São Paulo against Goulart. This was a great relief to the rebels in Minas Gerais, as until then no other significant command had publicly joined the coup.

Before leaving, Mourão received news from two engineers who came from Rio de Janeiro of troops and artillery coming on the road, under the command of colonel Raimundo. On the way, he met marshal Denys coming from Juiz de Fora to the Tiradentes Detachment, where he arrived at 03:30. According to captain Mandarino, within the ranks of the detachment there was fear about what colonel Raimundo and his 1st RI would do. Muricy was called between 03 and 04:00 to a nearby farm, where Denys gave him crucial news: colonel Raimundo would come not to fight, but to join his side.

In Denys' version, colonel João Batista da Costa, chief of staff of the 4th RM, sent his civilian son, Milton Batista da Costa, to Três Rios the day before. There, he was supposed to observe and report the volume, composition and commander of the opposing troops. After informing Juiz de Fora that there were several units with Raimundo's 1st RI at the forefront, Milton was asked to call him on the phone. At 22:00 the Sampaio regiment's commander was questioned and taken to the phone at the Triângulo gas station. Raimundo found Denys, his friend, for whom he had been secretary, on the other end of the line. The marshal asked him to switch sides and he accepted: "you can count on me and my troops". However, Hugo de Abreu said he heard from Raimundo that the intention to join the coup existed since the departure, and thus, Denys' appeal was not that important. Although Raimundo was trusted by Oromar Osório, the loyalist commander of the 1st DI, his position against the government was known at least since 2 March.

Muricy went ahead of his troops in an Aero-Willys with a white flag to join the 1st RI and arrest Cunha Melo if he were with them. Upon reaching Serraria/Comendador Levy Gasparian, Raimundo jumped out of a jeep and handed him the regiment with one or two battalions. (Note: The Sampaio Regiment had two battalions (Pedrosa 2018, Apêndice 3). Gomes 1964, p. 120 and Mourão Filho 2011, p. 367, speak directly about 2 battalions that joined. Muricy 1981, p. 550, talks about, after desertion, 5 infantry battalions excluding the Military Police, which means that 2 were added to the 3 that left Minas Gerais. However, D'Aguiar 1976, p. 150, states that there was a battalion of the regiment in the barracks at Vila Militar after 12:30 on 1 April.) Around daybreak, at 05:00, the barriers on the road were removed and the regiment joined the rear of the detachment. As it was exhausted, it received, at Raimundo's request, food, rest and gasoline.

The decision of the 1st RI could influence the combat position of the rest of the 1st Army. By swearing loyalty to Muricy, it tilted the balance of forces in favor of the rebels, highlighted the possibility of other troops joining the coup and the crumbling of the government's military apparatus and influenced president Goulart's decision to abandon Rio de Janeiro. "It was the victory that appeared like a vision of light in that 18-hour darkness, during which we were alone", wrote Mourão, who, however, foresaw logistical difficulties that could come with the expansion of his force. Soon after the defection, the detachment resumed its advance south.

=== Artillery and remnants of the 1st BC ===
The 1st RI brought with it the 2nd/1st RO 105, but its commander, lieutenant colonel Raimundo Nonato, did not want to take part in the coup, but only wanted to retreat and would be accused of bad faith in the official report. For Muricy, even if this group retreated and did not take action against the Tiradentes Detachment, it would still inform the other loyalists of the situation, which would be unacceptable. He narrated his meeting with the commander as follows:

I said: "go back, go talk to your officers. Present my points of view and then tell me what was resolved". He went and, shortly after, a lieutenant or captain came running to me: "general, the artillery group is entering the road and is going to withdraw". Then I got so angry! (...) I ran towards the group and passed close to an infantry company from the 1st RI and said to the captain (...): "Put your people in line, ready to fire at my command". The people got ready, laid down ready to shoot, and I walked towards Raimundo Nonato. I told him to get out of the car, he got out, I said a series of insults. At this point we really lose our minds. I said a lot of things and arrested him.

He then put the vehicles on the road to block passage. He gathered the troops to give a lecture. He reported an episode that was even mentioned in O Globo as "the case of the prophet sergeant": in response to what he was saying, a sergeant said that "the Holy Spirit spoke through the mouth of the general!", resulting in the group joining. However, only one battery was added to the Tiradentes Detachment, as another managed to escape. The battery that joined was the 4th, while the one that managed to escape was the 6th, (Note: The group had only the 4th and 6th howitzer batteries.) of captain Audir Santos Maciel. He reported having fulfilled the last order he received from the commander — to return to the barracks in Rio de Janeiro. On the way, they passed the 1st Group before Petrópolis and the local residents, imagining that they were the triumphant Minas Gerais troops, applauded them as if they were a victorious army.

According to Rubens, Denys' son, Raimundo told him that he met Kerensky when he was on his way to join the coup, announcing his intention. Kerensky ended up returning to Petrópolis with his battalion, but some of his officers were still found in Serraria. Lieutenant colonel Walter Pires, who came with Muricy and was part of his General Staff, convinced some to join, while others refused and were arrested. Muricy addressed those who openly resisted him and praised their good faith. According to the Petrópolis press, the 1st BC remained in the state border region until 16:30 on 1 April, when it was ordered to return.

== Três Rios ==
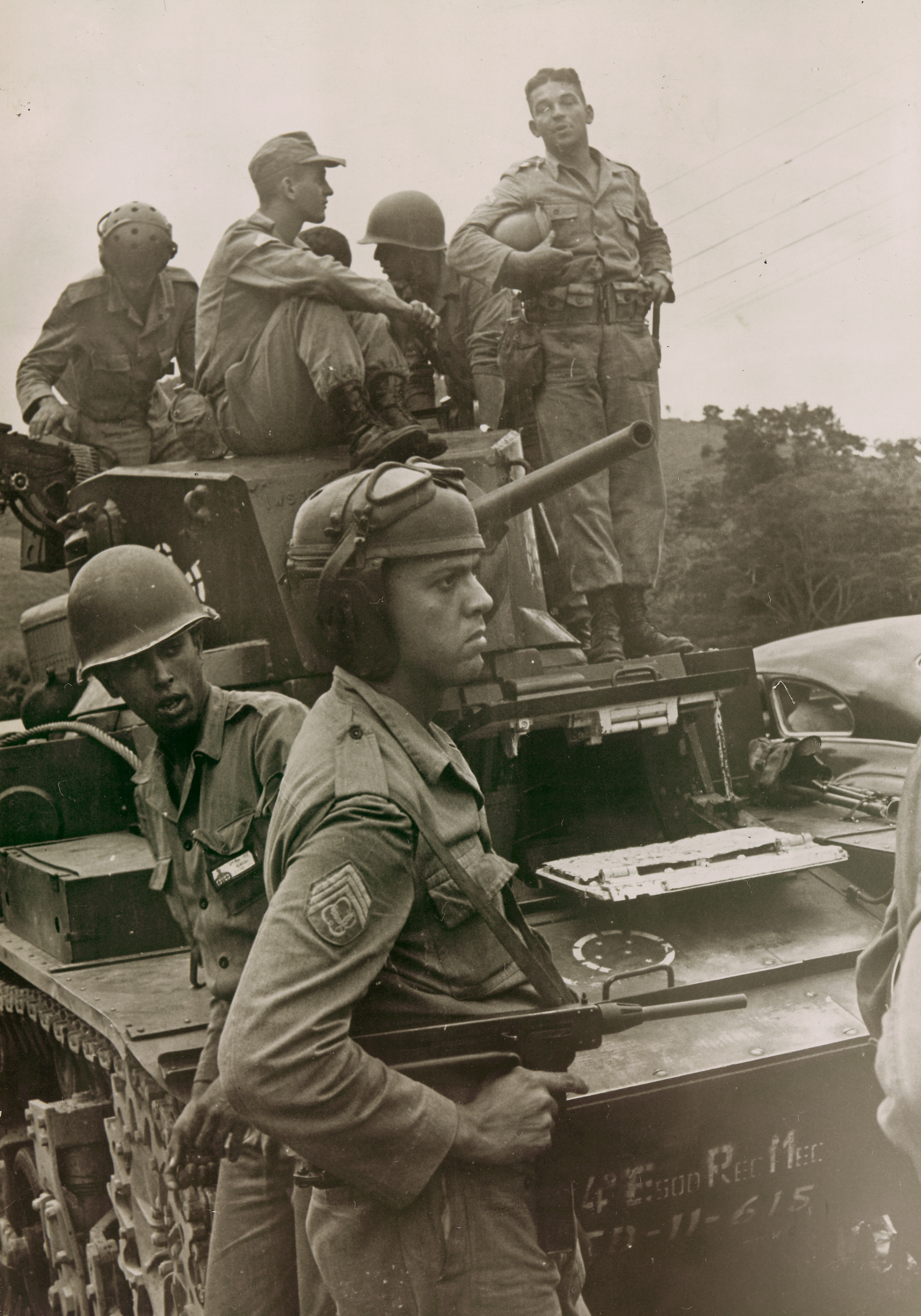
4th Esqd. Rec. Mec.

According to Muricy, Cunha Melo's force was shaken with the defection of the 1st RI, but there was still a major obstacle, the Paraíba do Sul river, in Três Rios. Thus, he and his General Staff accompanied the vanguard (Note: In a statement — Motta 2003, p. 43-44, Tomo 14 — Muricy states that it was the 11th IR, and in another — in O Globo in 1979 — that it was the 10th IR. The second talks about the "Vanguard of the detachment, made up of the 4th Mechanized Reconnaissance Squadron and the 1st Battalion of the 10th Infantry Regiment".) to the city, which was reached at 10:30.

In this move south, fuel was the biggest concern. Thus, the gasoline trucks that went from Rio de Janeiro to Minas Gerais were requisitioned and integrated into the column. Drivers received a document to later receive payment.

Três Rios had an open western flank and there was no news, either from the units of the 1st Army to the west, the 2nd Army or the NCO Academy in Três Corações. The detachment protected itself by sending a flank guard made up of the 2nd Battalion of the PMMG and an anti-tank section to the west, to a station along Paraíba surrounded by high hills, through which both the highway (BR-57) and the railway pass, to block any move in that direction. (Note: Muricy 1981, p. 549 refers to a company, and Muricy 1979, to a section. Gomes 1983, p. 63 refers to a section. Muricy 1979 refers to the 9th Battalion of the Military Police, Gomes 1983 to the 2nd and Muricy 1981 the "Falcão" Battalion (Galvão's surname, of the 2nd Battalion, incorrectly mentioned in the statement — see p. 535, where the 9th is also incorrectly cited).) Reporters spotted a military presence in Paraíba do Sul, west of Três Rios. The threat could come from Valença (2nd Tank Battalion), Barra Mansa (1st Armored Infantry Battalion) or even São Paulo. According to major Cid Goffredo, liaison officer between the 4th RM and the Tiradentes Detachment, from the beginning Muricy feared that a loyalist force from São Paulo could use the road that passes through Volta Redonda to reach Três Rios and interfere with the Minas Gerais axis.

Dispositivo do Destacamento Tiradentes ao passar por Três Rios
Vanguard: 2nd Company of the 10th RI (Reinforced), Platoon of the 4th Esqd Rec Mec

1st Echelon: 11th RI, 2nd Battalion of the 12th RI, 1st Group of the 4th RO 105 (Minus one battery) (Note: "At 8:30 on 1 April [the 1st/4th RO 105] moved in support of the 12th RI, forming GT/12, arriving in Três Rios at 9:30" (Gomes 1983, p. 63).)

2nd Echelon: 10th RI (Minus the 2nd Company), A battery of the 4th RO 105

3rd Echelon: 1st RI, 2nd Group of the 1st RO 105 (Minus the 6th Battery)

The detachment made landfall to the south of the city. The official report recorded contact with the enemy, the 2nd RI, at 11:00. The 2nd RI was noticed when a jeep approached the bridge, and, upon seeing the rebels, turned around and ran towards Areal. Djalma Dias Ribeiro, coming from Rio de Janeiro, told Muricy what he assessed to be 2–3 infantry battalions and 2–4 artillery batteries that had passed through Belvedere; from the time he saw it, this loyalist force should be in the Areal region at the moment.

== Areal: confrontation with the 2nd RI ==
=== The foreseen conflict ===
In the Areal region the fighting scenario is more impressive, with the military operation unfolding in all the movements of an imminent action. The hypothesis that the "first shot" could be fired in Areal is quite acceptable to everyone.

— Gomes, Eduardo. Minas: do diálogo ao front (1964) p. 121

At 4:00, the small town of Areal, then a district of Três Rios, dawned full of soldiers. They took what would later become the "Posto do Nino" as their headquarters, set up machine gun nests at the post and on the roads, positioned dynamite ready to detonate the bridge over the Piabanha river in the center and established themselves on the hills. Businesses closed and residents took refuge in the church or were taken by trucks to distant neighborhoods. They had little information about what was happening and feared an imminent bloody war.

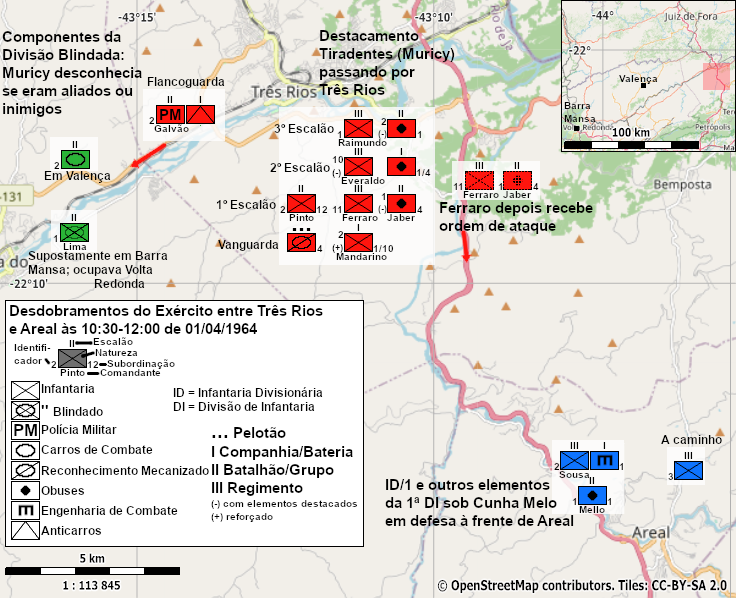
Disposition of forces between Três Rios and Areal

It was general Cunha Melo's loyalist troops, still determined to fight. All that he had left was the 2nd RI, the artillery from the 1st Group of the 1st RO 105 and engineers from the 1st BE Cmb. The 3rd RI was climbing the mountains in 13 chartered buses. (Note: Captain Mandarino, in Motta 2003, p. 182, Tomo 3 remembers the 3rd RI being in Areal. Silva 2014a, p. 366 states that Cunha Melo "Disposed the rest of the troops, that is, two infantry regiments...". Muricy 1981, p. 549-553, gives estimates of the number of the opponent's battalions between 2 and 4; both the second and third regiments had two battalions, as per Pedrosa 2018, appendix 3.) Cunha found them faithful: only one captain (from the 1st BE Cmb company) and a lieutenant refused and were arrested. With the 1st RI's side-switching, Cunha's troops were already a numerically inferior force, unable to go on the offensive, but it was positioned in good defensive terrain, deployed in combat position, with collective weapons. Reporters found many guns at strategic points and 21 vehicles from the 1st RO 105 in Posse, a district of Petrópolis near Areal. However, according to Muricy, the best defensive position would be further south, in the gorge between Areal and Petrópolis, not in the region between Areal and Três Rios, which already gave him relief. According to another assessment, the eighteen 105 mm howitzers placed next to the road by the loyalists could descend a "fire barrage" almost impossible to cross.

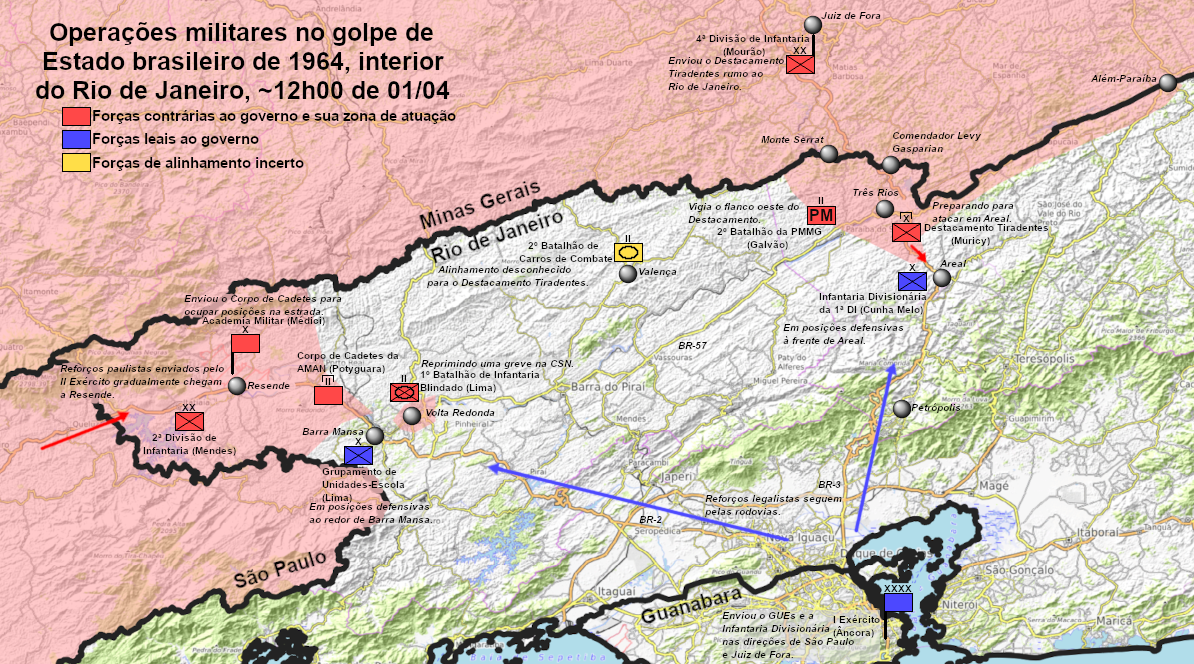
Military situation in the Minas Gerais and São Paulo directions around noon on 1 April

Muricy needed to dislodge Cunha Melo and reach the lowlands. He assessed he was equal or slightly superior in forces, having 5 infantry battalions and 1 police battalion against a maximum of 4 loyalists, and his personnel was more willing to fight. However, he still could not carry out "a real clash in the open field". To overcome Cunha Melo he would need a surprise action. Tactically, it would take advantage of the loyalists not having had time to gain a foothold. Politically, the possibility that some of them did not want to fight in defense of the government that they did not approve of. Both required haste. Colonel Ferraro, commander of the 11th RI, would take his regiment, reinforced, and the group of howitzers, would go out in front of the detachment in an approach maneuver, change the column formation for an open maneuver and, even in disarray, attack the 2nd RI, having time as a priority. The attack mission was set at noon. (Note: "At 12:15 pm a new GT/11 (11th RI and 1st/4th RO 105) was formed with the mission of occupying the Areal region". Gomes 1983, p. 63.)

=== Negotiations with Cunha Melo ===
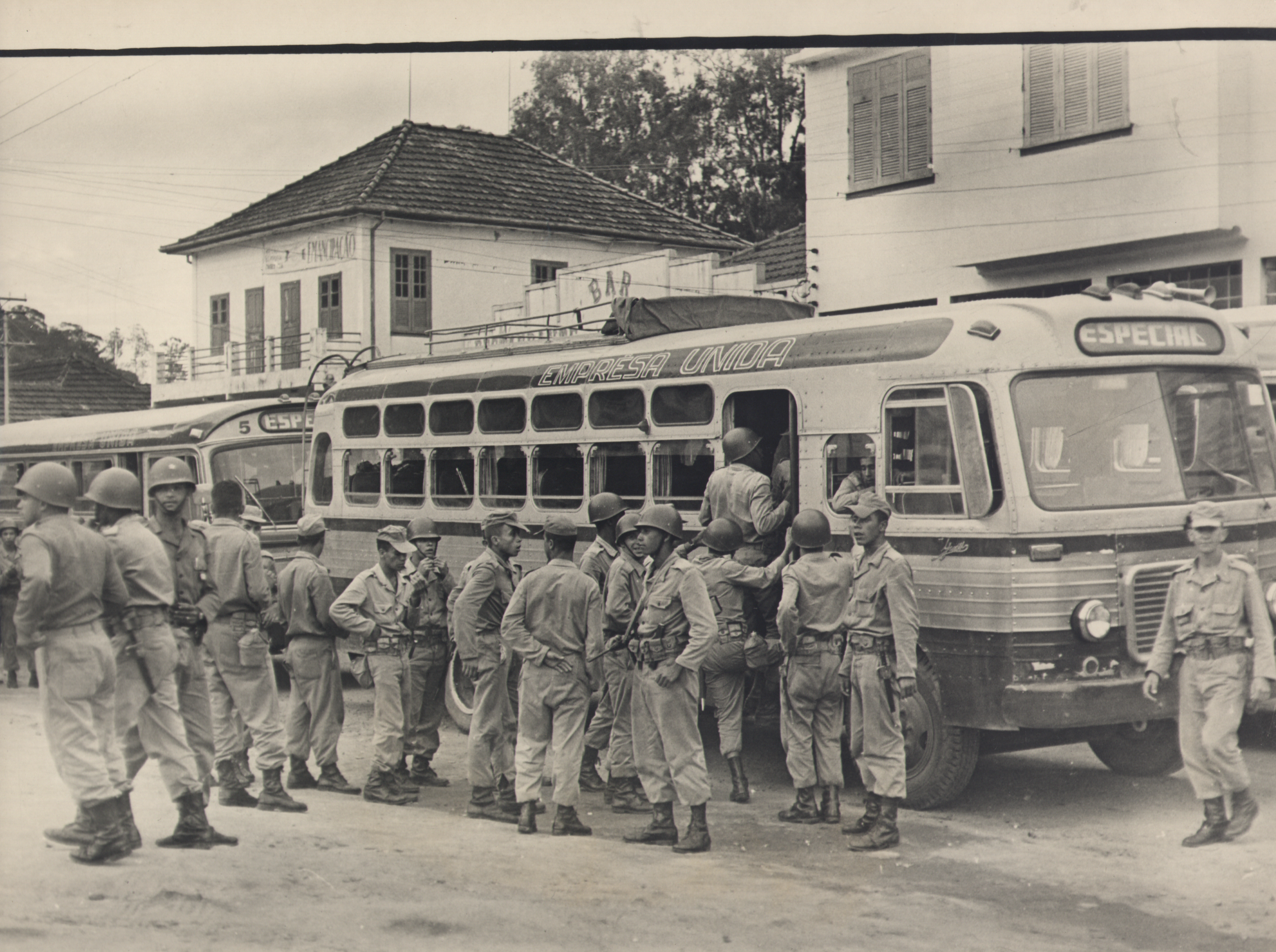
Passage of the Tiradentes Detachment through Areal

Between 13–14:00 food columns were delayed. At this point, according to captain Mandarino, the 2nd Riflement Company was eating cold rations, but was receiving food and moral support from the population. Walter Pires was sent to Três Rios to speak with Juiz de Fora, where Mourão Filho informed him of the situation: Goulart had left Rio de Janeiro, generals Âncora and Kruel would meet at the Military Academy of Agulhas Negras to hold negotiations between the 2nd Army and the loyalists and the detachment should slow down and avoid unnecessary combat. The events in the interior of Rio de Janeiro had an impact on Guanabara, with 1st RI's defection having been one of the factors that impelled Goulart to leave the city and go to Brasília. The president's departure, in turn, precipitated the collapse of the 1st Army's resistance.

Returning to Muricy, Walter crossed the 2nd RI to carry his message to Cunha Melo: "I am preparing to attack, verify the veracity of the Ancora-Kruel meeting and avoid bloodshed". The answer came from major Granja, (Note: Alírio Granja, parachutist and FEB veteran (Motta 2003, p. 310, Tomo 3).) from Cunha Melo's staff, who arrived an hour later: "I have no news of this meeting (Muricy could be bluffing), the first shot won't come from me but I have a mission to defend and I will fulfill it". Muricy said to Granja: "And I received the mission to go to Rio de Janeiro and I'm going to leave for Rio de Janeiro"; "you must have passed by my troops and you must know that I am preparing to attack"; he would do so if he did not receive any further warning, but as a gentleman, he informed the time: in one hour. It was decided that there would be no hostility while Cunha Melo sought confirmation from his superiors. Present there, colonel Ferraro showed impatience — "If they are going to resist, let’s attack now". Granja saw the troops move to the foot of the slope of an elevation ahead.

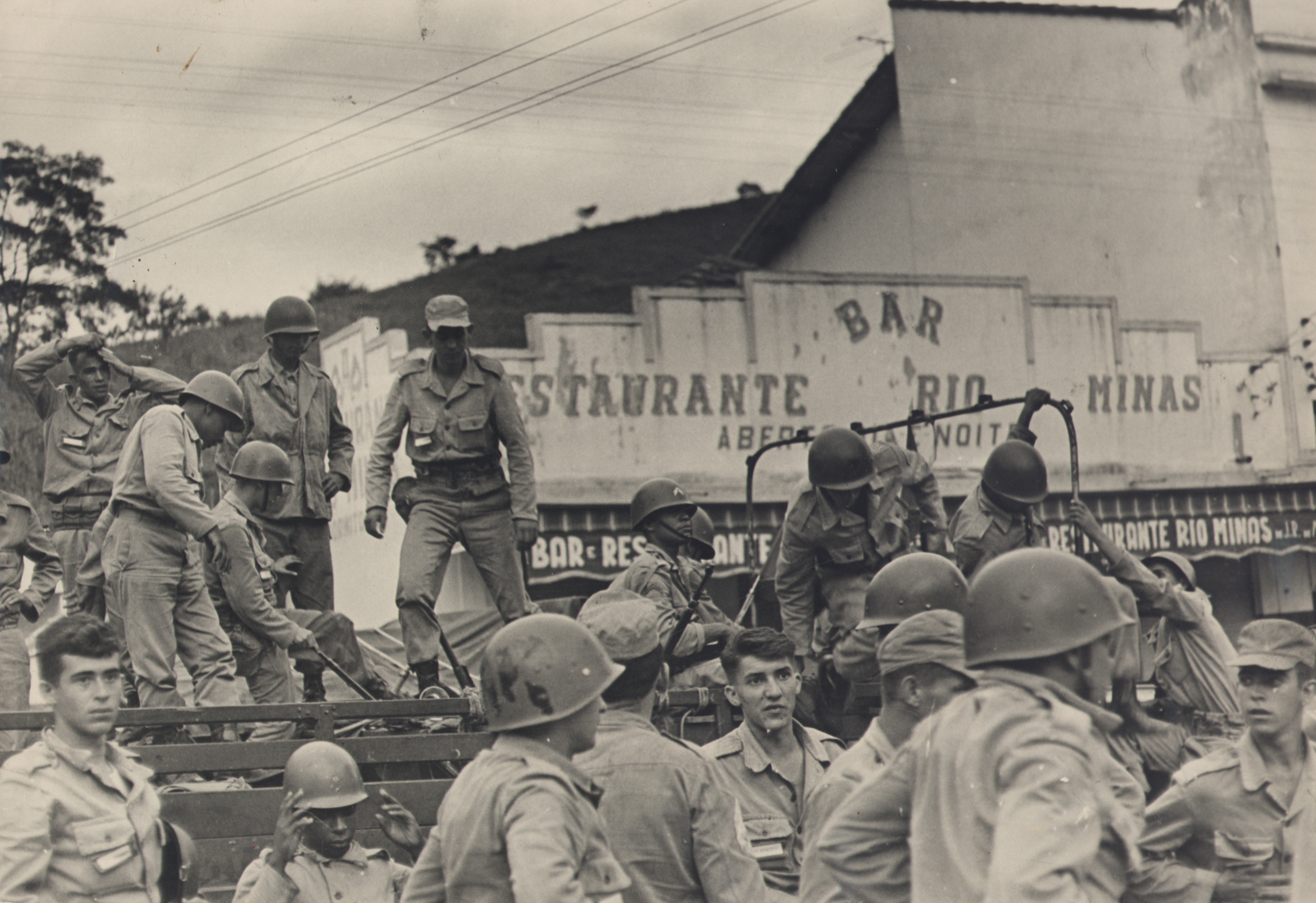
Passage of the Tiradentes Detachment through Areal

Cunha Melo telephoned Rio de Janeiro, getting in touch with the head of the president's military cabinet, general Argemiro de Assis Brasil. He heard confirmation: Jango and Âncora had left Rio de Janeiro, the latter to negotiate pacification. "As Cunha Melo asked what to do, he was told to do whatever he wanted. His mission was finished". Cunha Melo "realized that he was defending a practically deposed government". At 14:30 he then sent word of his willingness to open the way and allow the rebels to descend to Guanabara without resistance. Two hours after Granja's mission, another emissary from Cunha Melo arrived with his conditions:

- Don't invade the Duque de Caxias and Manguinhos refineries;
- Don't pass through Petrópolis so as to not demoralize Kerensky;
- Don't move forward immediately after the retreat so as to avoid creating the impression that he had been chased away.

Muricy replied:

- "I need gasoline and, if possible, I want to leave you without gasoline. I have to occupy the refinery and my troops will occupy it, there's no doubt about it";
- "Well, am I going to pass through a bypass road and leave it without my control?! No, I can't advance militarily without taking possession of the side roads. So be patient, I'm going to pass through Petrópolis anyway. I have to decompose my column, send a troop along the bypass road and another along the Union and Industry, inside Petrópolis";
- "I will leave in two hours. In two hours, Cunha Melo's troops have time to withdraw..."

On a bridge north of Areal, on the road to Além Paraíba, Muricy announced to his officers: Goulart left, there was an agreement at the Military Academy and the government ceased resistance. They were victorious and would advance at an agreed time. At 16:40–50, Cunha Melo retreated: from the hills around the city "soldiers came descending like ants". By night, there were only a few stalled vehicles left on the road. After some time Muricy moved on. (Note: Muricy remembers waiting not the agreed two hours, but just over an hour (Muricy 1981, p. 553) For historian Hernani D'Aguiar, based on the official report, "despite intending to partially comply with what was requested of him, giving two hours of head time to the forces that would withdraw, general Muricy verified that it would be disadvantageous to the revolution to acquiesce to the requests, ordering, at 17:00, that the detachment continued on Areal (D'Aguiar 1976, p. 138). In Gomes 1983, p. 63, Areal is reached at 16:00.) Reporters witnessed the passage through the city's center.

When the column was in the Areal region, it was flown over by an Air Force plane piloted by Rui Moreira Lima, on his own initiative. In two low flights, he put soldiers and trucks to flight. However, he was piloting a Paris, an unarmed tourist plane, on a reconnaissance mission. He had no orders from above and was immediately ordered to land at Santos Dumont Airport.

== Petrópolis and Duque de Caxias ==
The column met the 2nd RI and the 2nd/3rd RI on the way. They were ideologically aligned and joined the coup, the first in Pedro do Rio and the latter in Itaipava. The commander of the 2nd RI introduced himself to Muricy: he had been abandoned by Cunha Melo and had been on the loyalist side only because of his loyalty to the Minister of War. "I owe a lot of my military career to Jair and I would never be against the minister. But when the president leaves, my troops are entirely at your disposal". More troops were found ahead, so that by the end of the route the number had doubled, from 3 to 4–5 thousand soldiers. Only part of Cunha Melo's force managed to escape.

The detachment approached Petrópolis at 18:30 and at the Bonsucesso junction (Note: Motta 2003, p. 85, Tomo 3: "When we reached the entrance to Petrópolis, where there is, to this day, a monument of a carriage, general Muricy ordered: 'Cid, you are going to stay here and send a GT there, another GT here, and another GT elsewhere'".) it was divided into Tactical Groups based on each of the regiments coming from Minas Gerais. As a flank guard, the 10th RI crossed the center of Petrópolis towards Quitandinha, while the bulk of the troops followed the bypass road.

Around 22:00, Muricy informed Mourão that, with the road clear, he was heading to Belvedere do Grinfo, the reference point for leaving Petrópolis. Mourão decided to withdraw his command post from Juiz de Fora and continue on the road towards his troops. Major Cid, who distributed the troops at the entrance to Petrópolis, remembered Mourão's car arriving at 23:00. Mourão asked for Muricy - he was in a hotel - and sent him the order to go down to the gas holder on Avenida Brasil. For Mourão, the priority was to reach Guanabara before the 2nd and Kruel, whom he considered to be "of the same breed as Jango, or worse, because he wears a four-star uniform. He planned the closure of Congress in 1963, on the occasion of the famous plebiscite-Brochado Rocha issue".

In the early hours of the morning, Mourão Filho and Muricy (with their General Staff), in torrential rain, ran down the mountains, each in their own vehicle. Further ahead of the detachment, they found themselves between Belvedere and the National Motor Factory. The radio in the car gave a great surprise: general Costa e Silva had assumed the "Supreme Command of the Revolution" and appointed general Octacílio Terra Ururaí commander of the 1st Army. The loyalist reaction apparatus had collapsed from within, making Rio de Janeiro "a revolutionary camp that had a leader and did not need another".

Depending on the source, the Tiradentes Detachment entered the city of Rio de Janeiro before midnight, descended the mountains in the early hours of the 2nd, or entered the city at 3:00. (Note: Dulles 2014, p. 332, citing a report from the 1st Army.) It did not expect combat and did not even take security precautions so as not to create distrust in the local coupists. On the way, passing through Duque de Caxias, there were rumors of strikes at the National Motor Factory and the refinery; the troops even heard that the gasoline production plant would be destroyed. Ferraro sent a company from his 11th RI to occupy the factory, while the refinery was occupied by captain Veloso's company, from the 10th RI, sent by the detachment. However, according to captain Mandarino, there was no strike in either case. The official history of the 1st/4th RO 105 records its departure at 21:30, arriving at the National Motor Factory at midnight and restarting movement at 7:00, with a stop on the border between Rio de Janeiro and Guanabara, again moving at 14:00 and arriving at the final destination at 15:45.

== Guanabara ==
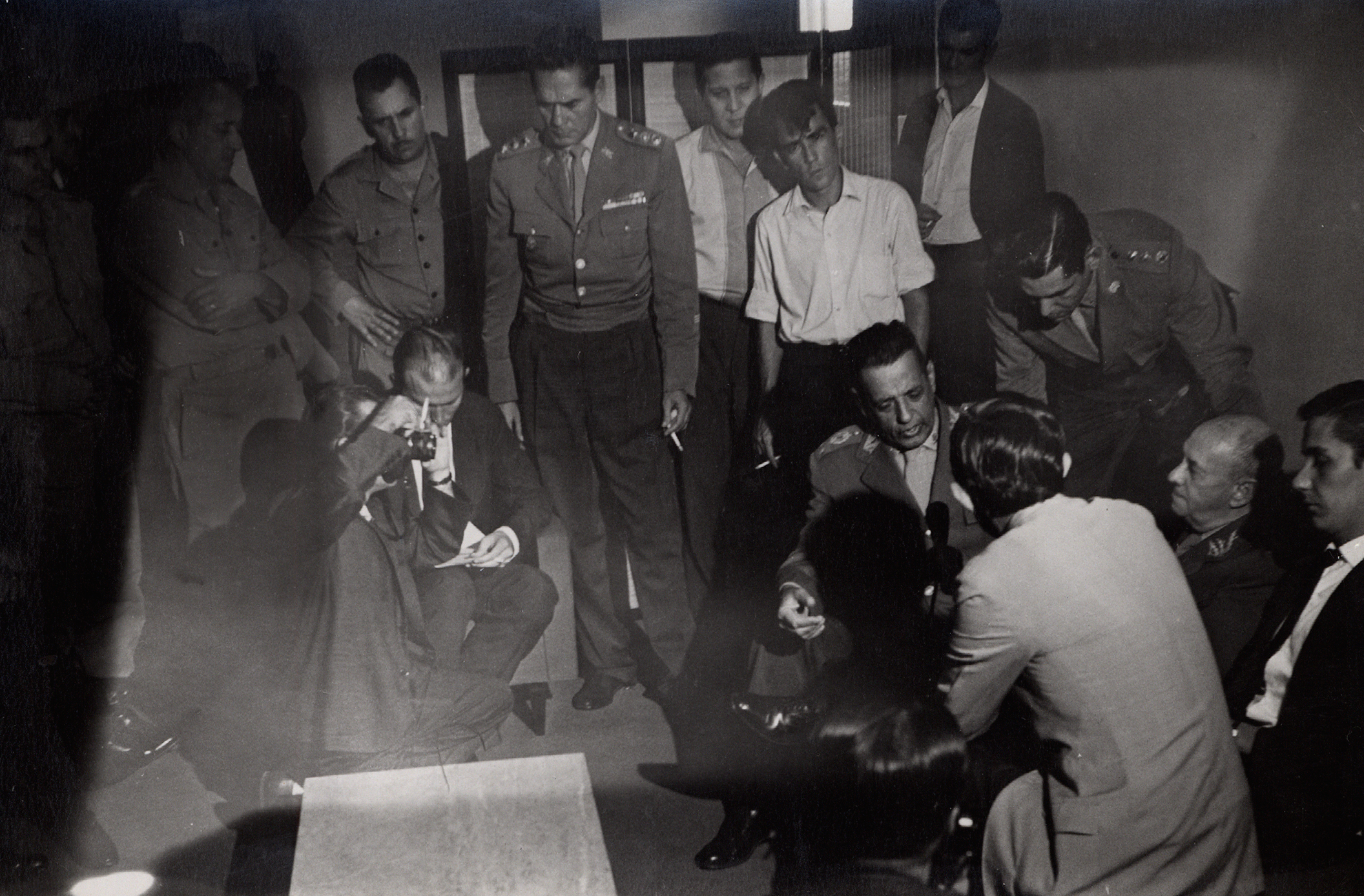
Mourão and Muricy being interviewed in Rio de Janeiro

Mourão was outraged by the news of Ururaí's appointment, as he considered himself the rightful owner of the 1st Army after Âncora's fall. He went to discuss it with Costa e Silva, who now occupied the Ministry of War, but had to accept the fait accompli. At Costa e Silva's request, he maintained the Tiradentes Detachment in Guanabara for a while longer, to consolidate the position of the Supreme Command of the Revolution; in lieutenant De Biasi's explanation, it was because the unit was a highly loyal force and at that time the commands were changing. According to Mourão, his troops were the only ones trusted by Costa e Silva at the time, as he was under pressure from Castelo Branco and the Rio garrison was indifferent to the situation.

The Guanabara units that had joined the coup returned to the Vila Militar. Carlos Lacerda, governor of Guanabara, offered the Maracanã stadium for the rest to stay. There they carried out a circular defense, received visits from authorities, slept on roll-away beds or on the ground and were fed by the Social Security Food Service. Requests to send forces appeared all the time: the Army Command and General Staff College would supposedly be invaded by marines, the Military College would be attacked, the Chief of Staff of the 1st Army wanted a battalion in the HQ building, etc. But colonel Dióscoro Vale, commander of the 12th RI, prevented any exit.

The return to Minas Gerais was on 6 April. At 19:30 the 1st/4th RO 105 arrived at its barracks. The local press recorded that the Tiradentes Detachment, with Mourão at the head, was received by the governor and acclaimed by a crowd in Juiz de Fora. Its apotheotic reception upon its return is mentioned in several testimonies from participants. On the morning of 7 April the detachment was dissolved.

== Belo Horizonte–Brasília axis ==
On the other axis of the operation, Minas Gerais leaders were surprised by the approach of a loyalist column from the Presidential Guard Battalion (BGP), coming from Brasília, on the Minas Gerais-Goiás border. The column left on the morning of 1 April, when the offensive from Minas Gerais was not yet ready. The 10th PMMG battalion was sent to Paracatu to prevent the BGP from entering Minas Gerais territory, but the BGP later returned to Brasília. More forces were gathered in Belo Horizonte, entering Brasília on 2 April, when the government was already deposed.
