= Instituto Brasileiro de Ação Democrática =

Brazilian conservative think tank

The Instituto Brasileiro de Ação Democrática (Brazilian Institute for Democratic Action) or IBAD, founded in May 1959 by Ivan Hasslocher, was one of two Brazilian conservative think tanks (the other was the IPES) established in order to prevent what was seen as the advance of communism in Brazil. It arose as a reaction to the government of Juscelino Kubitschek, regarded as populist and lenient on fighting inflation, and intensified its action in João Goulart's administration, with campaigns of anti-communist content on the radio, television and newspapers. The IBAD had its own advertising agency, the Incrementadora de Vendas Promotion, and created a political movement called the Ação Democrática Popular (Popular Democratic Action or ADEP), explicitly geared towards raising money and promoting anti-communist candidates, particularly during the electoral campaign of 1962 to the Brazilian legislature.

The overt involvement of IBAD and ADEP in the 1962 campaign, which included the rent for 90 days of the carioca daily A Noite and the publishing by the newspaper O Globo of the book Assalto ao Parlamento (or Storming the Parliament, published in the United States as And Not A Shot Is Fired) of the Czech writer Jan Kozak, led to the creation of a Parliamentary Commission of Inquiry (CPI) in 1963. Although the IBAD had destroyed many of its documents before they could be analyzed by the commission, the remaining were sufficient to demonstrate that the institute was funded by foreign companies, mostly from the United States. Then, President Goulart ordered an investigation by the judiciary that would determine what should be done with the institute. Finally, on December 20, 1963, IBAD and ADEP were dissolved by court order.

== See also ==
- Covert United States foreign regime change actions
