= Instituto de Pesquisas e Estudos Sociais =

Defunct Brazilian think tank

The Instituto de Pesquisas e Estudos Sociais (Institute of Research and Social Studies), or IPÊS, was a Brazilian conservative think tank, founded in Rio de Janeiro in 1962 by Augusto Trajano de Azevedo Antunes (Caemi) and Antônio Gallotti (Light S.A.). It was one of the two leading conservative think tanks in Brazil organized from the late 1950s with the explicit goal to prevent what was deemed as the spread of Communism over Brazil (the other was the IBAD). However, differently from the IBAD, that openly funded the campaigns of anti-Communist politicians, the IPES centered its work in the field of anti-governmental propaganda, through the production of movies of "democratic indoctrination", financing of courses, seminars and lectures, publishing of anti-Communist books and pamphlets (such as "UNE, instrumento de subversão" - UNE, instrument of subversion, addressed to undergraduate students) and the cooptation of organizations opposing the government of President João Goulart, such as the Círculos Operários (Rio de Janeiro and São Paulo), the Brazilian Confederation of Christian Workers (CBTC), the União Cívica Feminina of São Paulo and the Movimento Universitário de Desfavelamento. In 1963, its activities were investigated by a Parliamentary Commission of Inquiry (CPI), but the Institute was acquitted. In 1966, two years after the military coup that overthrew João Goulart, the IPÊS was recognized as an "entity of public utility" through a presidential decree. The IPÊS survived until 1972 in Rio de Janeiro (the São Paulo's branch was deactivated in 1970).

== See also ==
- Covert United States foreign regime change actions
