= Paratroopers Brigade (Brazil) =

Paratrooper Infantry Brigade
- Brigada de Infantaria Paraquedista
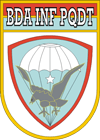
- Coat of arms
- Active: 1945; 81 years ago
- Country: Brazil
- Branch: Brazilian Army
- Type: Infantry
- Role: Paratrooper
- Size: 5,400 (2015)
- Part of: Eastern Military Command
- Garrison/HQ: Rio de Janeiro, Brazil
- Nickname: Bda Inf Pqdt
- Mottos: Brasil acima de tudo! ("Brazil above everything!")
- Engagements: List: United Nations Emergency Force; Jacareacanga Revolt; Aragarças Revolt; Sergeants' Revolt; Inter-American Peace Force; Araguaia Guerrilla War; United Nations Operation in Mozambique; United Nations Angola Verification Mission III; United Nations Mission of Support to East Timor; United Nations Stabilisation Mission in Haiti; 2010 Rio de Janeiro security crisis; 2014 occupation of Complexo da Maré
- Website: www.bdainfpqdt.eb.mil.br

Commanders
- Current commander: Adriano Fructuoso da Costa
- Notable commanders: Nestor Penha Brasil; Hugo de Abreu

The Paratrooper Infantry Brigade (Portuguese: Brigada de Infantaria Paraquedista; Bda Inf Pqd) is one of the brigades of the Brazilian Army. Based in Rio de Janeiro, it is subordinate to the Eastern Military Command, also in Rio, in conjunction with the Land Operations Command in Brasília. Embarked on aircraft of the Brazilian Air Force (FAB), its task forces can rapidly deploy to any point within Brazil's territory. Considered an elite unit, it consists of volunteer soldiers who distinguish themselves from the rest of the army through unique traditions and values.

The brigade is organized into three paratrooper infantry battalions, supported by other components, including unique elements such as pathfinders—its elite—paratrooper cavalry, and the Parachute Folding, Maintenance, and Air Supply Battalion (B DOMPSA). Parachuting in the Brazilian Army emerged after World War II. Shaped by political instability in the 1960s, it participated in counterinsurgency operations in the following decade and gave rise to the army's special operations forces, which were later separated. The brigade has participated in international contingents and, during the New Republic, has been involved in law and order operations, especially in Rio de Janeiro.

== Roles ==
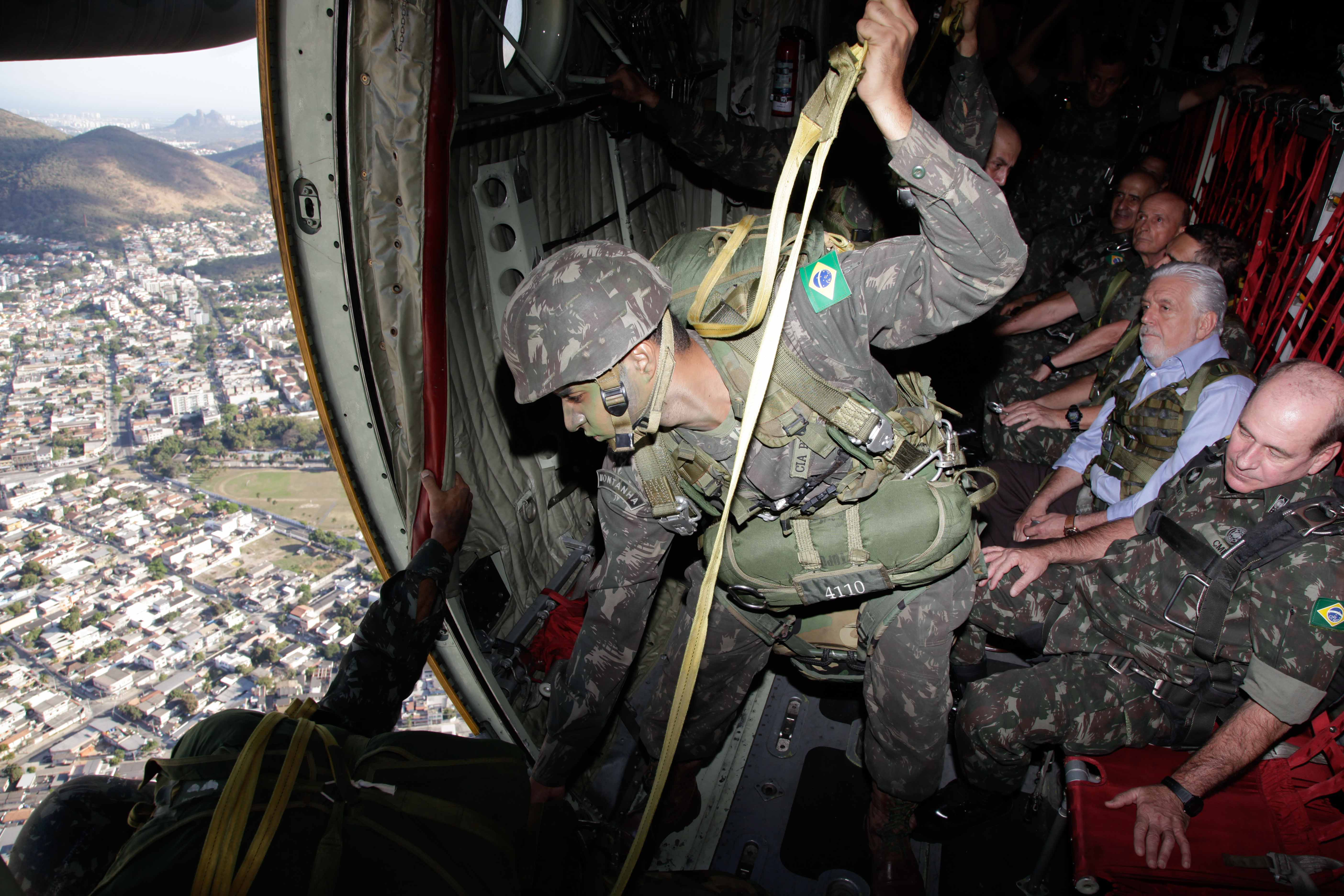
Parachute jump

Paratroopers are considered an elite force within the Brazilian Army. Like airmobile infantry and special operations units, paratrooper infantry is a Strategic Rapid Action Force, providing a quick response capability for the army. Their task forces are expected to operate at their destinations within 24 or 48 hours. They can be transported by air or deployed via parachute; in the latter case, they execute an airborne assault to establish a bridgehead in enemy territory. These rapid deployments can reach distant regions but are costly, as they require the participation of the Brazilian Air Force (FAB). The limited transport capacity remains a persistent issue, and in times of war, aerial resources may be occupied with other missions. (Note: Kuhlmann 2007, p. 117, adding that "in the period from 1989 to 1994, it was observed that the boarding and loading plan of the 8th Field Artillery Group was unfeasible, requiring many more aircraft than the North American artillery group that served in World War II. The issue persists, according to recent information".)

The Brazilian Army has never conducted an airborne assault in combat. While this type of operation is the brigade's most apparent specialty, it is unlikely to occur on a large scale in a conventional war. Even in the United States Army, an airborne assault with an entire brigade is considered unlikely. Since the Suez Crisis in 1956, parachute jumps have only been used against weaker adversaries and typically on smaller scales. The proliferation of surface-to-air missiles and armored forces makes airborne assaults highly risky against a conventional army, and entry into enemy territory, when necessary, is more easily achieved through amphibious invasions or helicopter deployments. Globally, light infantry forces, which are easily air-transportable, remain valuable for rapid crisis response, but they do not necessarily need to be paratroopers. The Brazilian brigade’s greatest utility historically has been its rapid reaction capability, which does not depend on parachute jumps.

== History ==
=== Early years ===
FAB paratroopers in 1944

The first parachute jump from a military aircraft in flight in Brazil took place in 1922. In the Brazilian Air Force (FAB), established in 1941, military parachuting was practiced from its early years. However, these programs were focused on aviators rather than large troop jumps, like those conducted by German paratroopers (Fallschirmjäger) and their American counterparts, both of which attracted interest in Brazil. Military instruction concepts that would later become defining features of the brigade, such as psychological preparation, were already under discussion at the time.

In this context, in 1944, captain Roberto Pêssoa, who had prior exposure to German airborne forces, was selected for a parachuting course at Fort Benning, USA. The following year, a decree-law established the foundation of the Paratrooper School. Under Pêssoa's supervision, another 46 Brazilian officers studied at Fort Benning until 1948, earning recognition as pioneers. They became instructors at the school, which began operations in 1949. Pêssoa aspired to lead the school, but the position was assumed by colonel Nestor Penha Brasil, creating a personal rivalry. Penha Brasil became the longest-serving commander, holding the position until 1955.

=== Development ===
Heavy load launch in 1972

In 1952, the "Nucleus of the Airborne Division" was created, of which the Paratrooper School became a part. The idea was to expand the nucleus into a complete division, with three infantry regiments, each with three battalions. However, it "never had more than one incomplete airborne infantry regiment, an artillery group, an engineering company, and a communications platoon", totaling 2,086 soldiers in 1960, which did not amount to the size of a brigade. The regiment had only one infantry battalion, and the artillery group did not fulfill its doctrinal organization, consisting of one 75 mm howitzer battery and another 105 mm battery.

In 1968, the nucleus became the "Airborne Brigade", with more modest expansion ambitions. In 1971, it was renamed the "Paratrooper Brigade". The term "airborne" encompasses both paratrooper and air-transported forces, and the name change acknowledged the absence of the latter category. During the "Airborne Brigade" period, there was no longer an infantry regiment, but the existing battalion was augmented with two new ones, forming the 1st, 2nd, and 3rd Airborne Infantry Battalions. Following the 1971 renaming, they became, respectively, the 26th, 27th, and 25th Paratrooper Infantry Battalions. The designation as "Paratrooper Infantry Brigade" in 1985 did not signify considerable changes but reflected a consistent naming convention for brigades by their branch (in this case, infantry) rather than their specialty.

Special operations, jungle warfare, and mountain warfare training in the Brazilian Army originated among the paratroopers. Special forces acquired their own course in 1957, along with a detachment that was expanded in 1983 into the 1st Special Forces Battalion. Initially, it was part of the brigade, but it now belongs to the Special Operations Command in Goiânia, where military parachuting is also practiced.

In 2010, there was a plan to transfer the brigade to the central part of the country, to locations such as Anápolis, Palmas, or the Triângulo Mineiro, where it would be closer to areas like the Amazon and free from interference caused by Rio de Janeiro's busy air traffic.

=== Political agitations ===
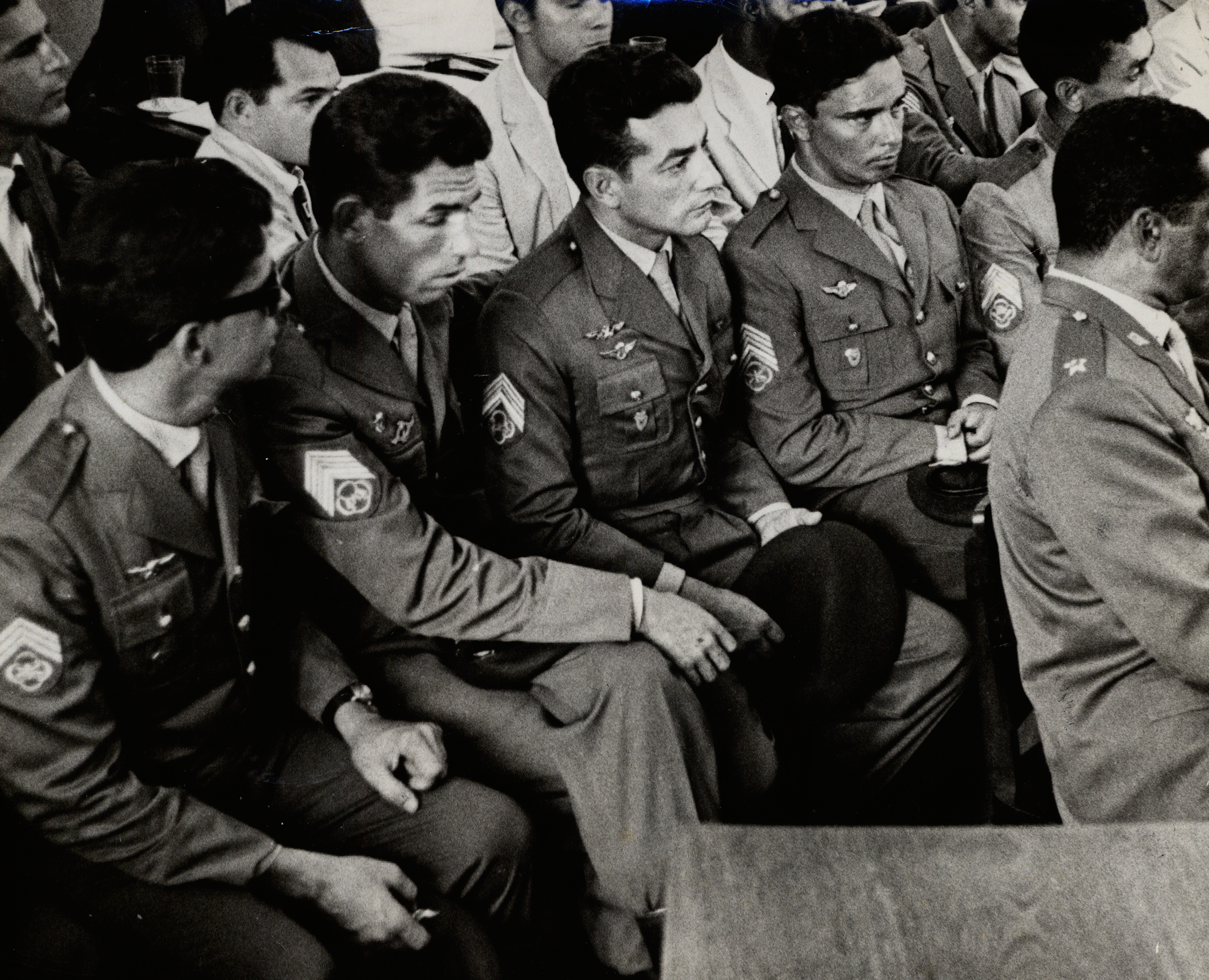
Trial of paratroopers in 1965

Paratroopers developed jungle skills as early as 1952 during the rescue operation for the Presidente aircraft, which had crashed in the Amazon region. Their ability to rapidly access any point within Brazil's territory was also critical during deployments to counter the Aragarças and Jacareacanga revolts in 1956 and 1959, respectively, though they did not engage in combat. In 1961, during the Legality Campaign, when the Third Army refused to recognize the authority of Minister of War Odílio Denys, the nucleus served as the minister's strategic reserve. Ernesto Geisel, head of the Military Cabinet of the Presidency, suggested deploying paratroopers in Curitiba, within the Third Army's territory, but Denys declined. By the end of the crisis, most paratroopers, like other key units in Rio de Janeiro, were against minister Denys.

Political instability during João Goulart's government also impacted the nucleus. Some paratroopers were involved in the political movements of enlisted ranks, such as sub-lieutenant Jelcy Rodrigues Corrêa, but they were not numerous. In 1963, after the defeat of the sergeants' revolt in Brasília, launched by these movements, an airborne company was used as an occupying force. Shortly thereafter, while the president was requesting a state of emergency, an assassination attempt allegedly ordered by the Minister of War against Carlos Lacerda, the opposition governor of Guanabara, was reported. A swiftly concluded investigation accepted the official version that no assassination attempt had occurred, but the commander, general Alfredo Pinheiro Soares Filho, a close ally of the president, was transferred. The general was part of the military apparatus aligned with Minister of War Jair Dantas Ribeiro. At the time of the 1964 coup d'état, the nucleus was under general João Costa, described as "a friend of Jair, but not deeply committed". On 1 April, he agreed to join the coup. With the advent of the military dictatorship, the purges initially targeted personnel associated with the previous regime, including members of the nucleus. General Alfredo Pinheiro was forced into retirement. The nucleus became the subject of Military Police Inquiry No. 104. Several individuals indicted in the inquiry later participated in the organization of the Caparaó Guerrilla (1966–1967).

The 1960s were marked by internal turmoil and indiscipline. Young paratrooper officers formed a small, highly politicized, and militant hardline minority within the army. General Sílvio Frota described the paratroopers as a "headache factory". According to Hugo de Abreu, "the paratrooper is, above all, sincere and cannot hide what he thinks or does, whether good or bad". Instability among the paratroopers peaked in 1969, when lieutenant colonel Dickson Melges Grael, commander of the 1st Airborne Artillery Group, rebelled against the 1969 military junta. The decision to meet the demands of the kidnappers of the U.S. ambassador, Charles Burke Elbrick, was unpopular among the officer corps. Grael led a group of 26 officers from the brigade and three from the Officers' Improvement School to Galeão Airport to prevent the boarding of political prisoners released in exchange for the ambassador. The operation failed and went no further than occupying a station of Rádio Nacional.

The occupation was linked to the Centelha Nativista (Nativist Spark), a nationalist group with significant participation from paratroopers. The nativists, who supported the presidential candidacy of general Afonso Augusto de Albuquerque Lima, had limited influence within the army. Some paratrooper officers even proposed a mutiny of the Salvador garrison to the general, but he declined. The Artillery Group refused to march in the 7 September parade. That year, there was also a possible external use of the brigade when president Costa e Silva was ill at the Laranjeiras Palace. Colonel Hílton Valle, head of security, feared that general Siseno Sarmento, commander of the I Army, might send paratroopers to transfer the president to a hospital, causing his definitive replacement and the end of the 1969 military junta.

The disciplinary situation in the brigade was considered by the new Minister of the Army, Orlando Geisel, as one of his most serious challenges. The occupation of Rádio Nacional resulted in the replacement of the brigade's commander, Adauto Bezerra de Araújo, with general Hugo de Abreu, who assumed command despite not having completed the paratrooper course. Hugo de Abreu commanded the brigade from 1970 to 1974, a relatively long tenure compared to his predecessors in the 1960s. Abreu supported the "idealism" of the young officer corps but did not tolerate irresponsible actions. He succeeded in disciplining the troops, earning him the title of "the man who pacified the paratroopers" from president Emílio Garrastazu Médici. A conservative identity for the paratrooper troops was solidified, with no significant internal conflicts. Hugo de Abreu also worked to promote the organization to the general public.

=== Counterinsurgency ===
Boarding of recruits for one of their first jumps in 1978

In the first half of the 1970s, the brigade specialized in "revolutionary warfare", participating in the repression of rural and urban armed struggle (in Rio de Janeiro). Hugo de Abreu’s adversaries labeled him as violent and harsh, citing his paratrooper background. The general described the paratroopers' engagement as ideologically motivated. Elements of the brigade fought in the Araguaia Guerrilla from 1972 to 1975. The successful Operation Marajoara, in its final phase, involved 750 men from the Paratrooper Brigade and the Jungle Warfare Instruction Center. Their participation was due to their high level of training, jungle experience, and reaction capability. The guerrilla left a significant impact on the brigade’s collective memory. After 1975, with the depletion of adversaries and the onset of political liberalization, the focus of training shifted back to airborne operations, although specialized units continued their counterinsurgency studies.

In 1977, the brigade was integrated into president Geisel's preparations to dismiss his Minister of the Army, general Sílvio Frota. Hugo de Abreu, now Chief of the Military Cabinet, positioned an emissary at the Vila Militar to ensure the brigade could be deployed anywhere in the country if necessary. On the day of the dismissal, he requested that a battalion remain ready to embark for Brasília, coordinating this with the 5th Aerial Transport Force. His concern was a potential reaction from battalions loyal to the minister, which ultimately did not occur.

=== New Republic ===
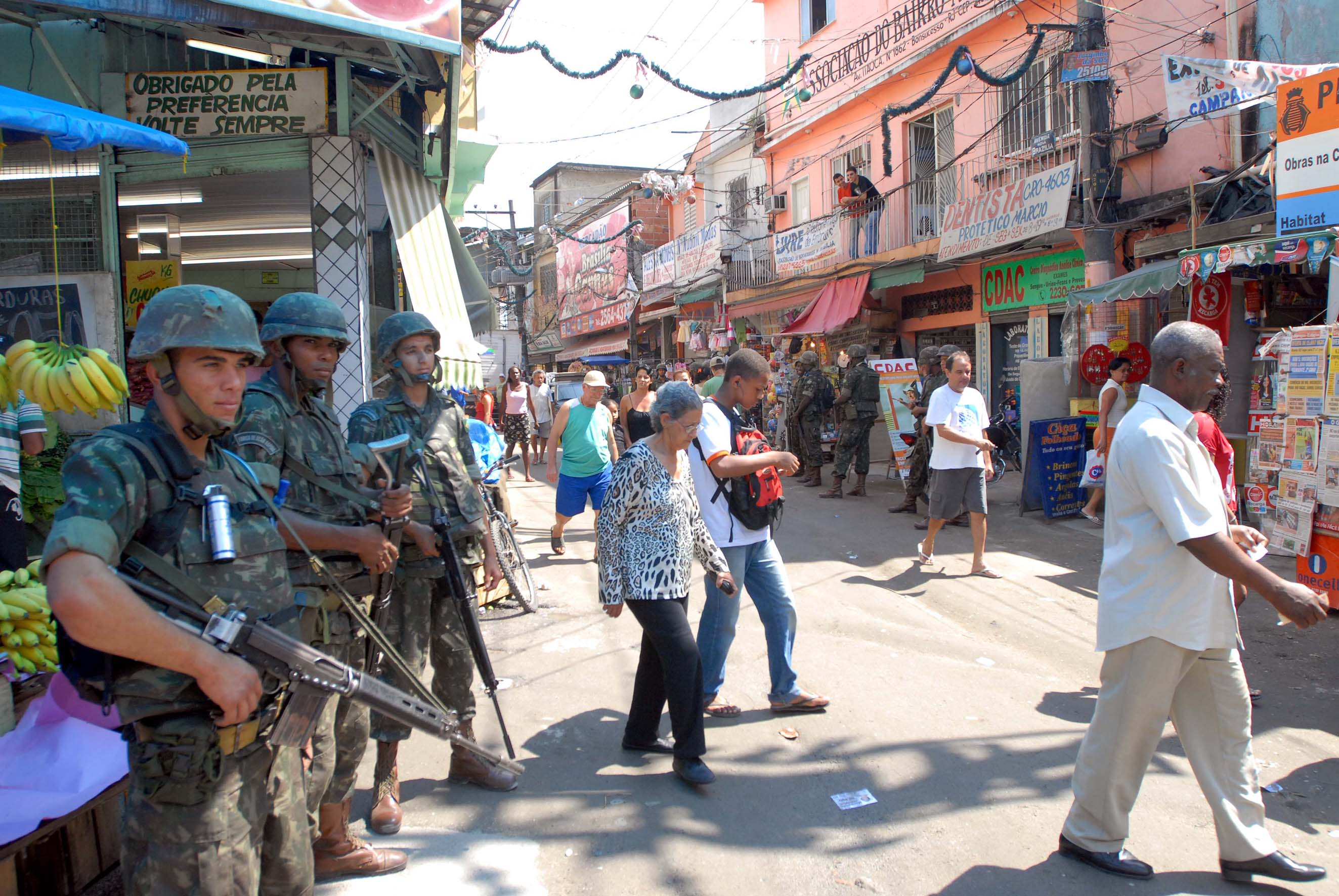
Paratroopers in Complexo do Alemão in 2008

Operation Traíra, launched in 1991 against the Revolutionary Armed Forces of Colombia (FARC), involved the 1st Special Forces Battalion, which was still part of the Brigade at the time, alongside helicopters from the Army Aviation.

From 1992 to 2020, paratroopers participated in 40 out of 138 law and order guarantee operations carried out by the Armed Forces, with securing electoral processes being the most frequent category. Operations such as Arcanjo, in 2010, and São Francisco, in 2014, stood out due to their scale. The former involved the occupation of the Alemão and Penha complexes, while the latter focused on the occupation of the Maré complex. The brigade also contributed personnel to the Organization of American States (OAS) intervention in the Dominican Republic in 1965 and to various United Nations peacekeeping contingents.

== Personnel ==
The brigade is composed solely of volunteer soldiers, unlike most other units where mandatory military service is necessary to fill the ranks. Typical volunteers come from the North and West Zones of the city of Rio de Janeiro and Baixada Fluminense. Given their circumstances ("few have reached high school"), the salaries are attractive (20% above the standard military pay), and job prospects in civilian life, particularly in private security, are better. However, candidates come from all regions of the city and state, and young men from the rest of the Southeast and the South regions travel to Rio de Janeiro for the opportunity to serve in the brigade. Recruitment is selective, with only 1,000 out of 6,000 volunteers from the previous year passing the initial physical test, and the training is demanding. Both the selection process and training aim to ensure homogeneity, standardizing the group's profile and behavior even more than is typical for military institutions. A significant portion of the personnel is involved in administrative functions, including soldiers from the Quartermaster Corps or those trained in Administration, Accounting, and Law.

The Brazilian Army is concerned about the drug trade's interest in recruiting former paratroopers. The skills acquired during training are powerful assets for gangs, which also target other army units and the Marine Corps. The potential connection of volunteers to drug trafficking is monitored during the selection process, and this concern was one of the reasons behind the proposal to relocate the unit to the Central Plateau. Compared to the hundreds of paratroopers who leave the service each year, estimates of those involved in trafficking are small (e.g., 15–20 in 2002), although the actual number may be significantly higher.

== Traditions ==
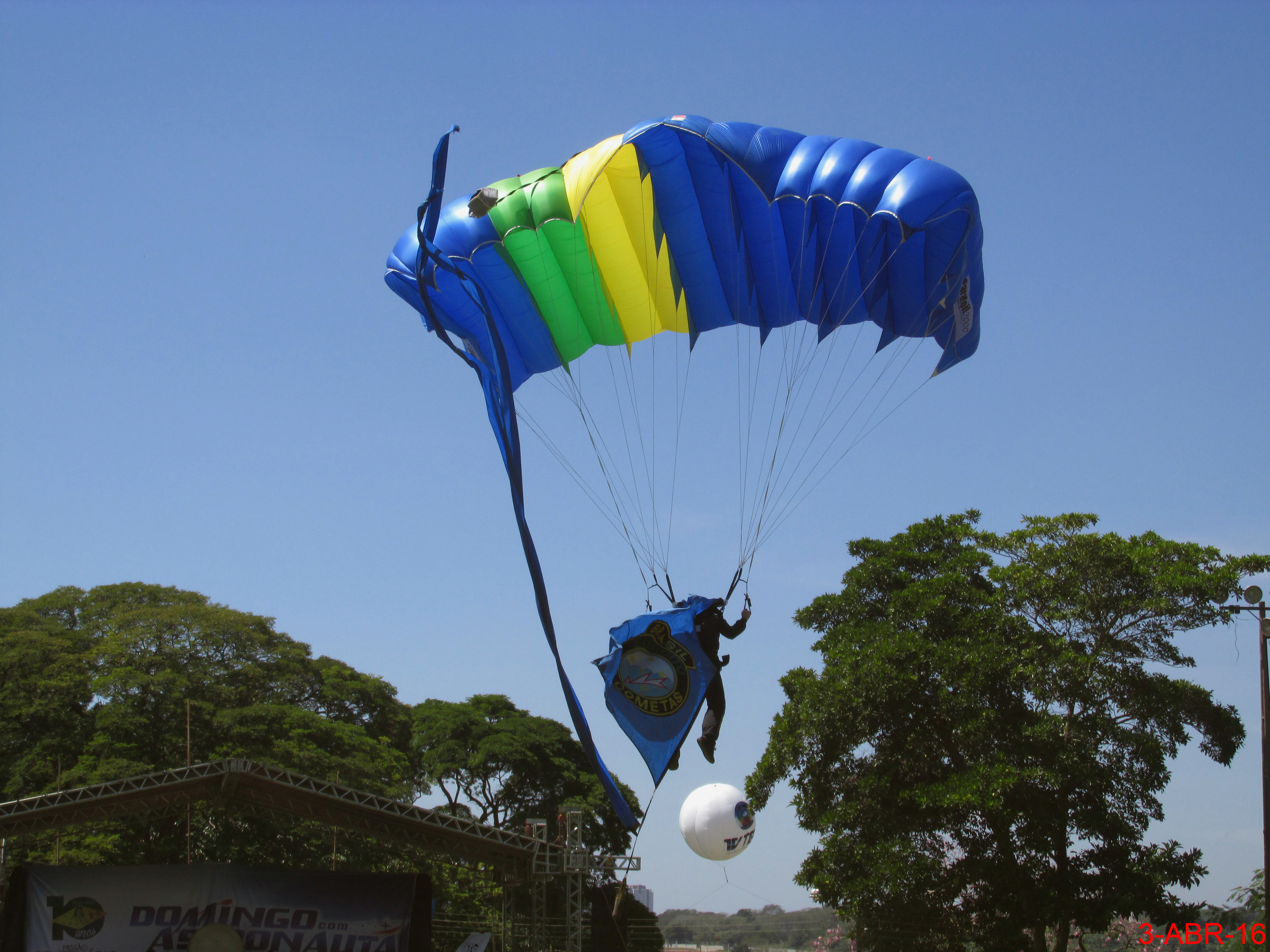
Demonstration by the brigade's free jumping team, "Os Cometas"

The voluntary composition of the personnel and the "paratrooper mystique" boost troop morale. The brigade is distinguished by a series of traditions and symbols, including their brown boots, the silver brevet featuring wings and a parachute at its center, the red berets, and the emblem of an eagle with open wings. The "paratrooper mystique" goes beyond these symbols, signifying a sense of belonging to a community and the perpetuation of its values and behaviors. Paratroopers have their own definitions of terms like sacrifice, courage, and patriotism. Their ideals include physical, intellectual, and emotional readiness, teamwork, and tradition, among others, as well as the cultivation of a masculine standard. These traditions reinforce both equality within the brigade and the distinction between its members and other military personnel, the "black feet", who do not wear the brown boots. There is also an emphasis on reducing the gap between officers and enlisted men, as they share equal risks.

The brigade has become a kind of "showcase" for the army. Parachuting, beyond its military function, has become a cultural artifact, valued for attracting publicity and shaping the paratroopers' identity. Military paratroopers view their activity differently from civilian sport parachutists. The risk of injury is inherent to the activity, but from January 2005 to August 2006, the injury rate during the brigade's training jumps was 1.2%, which is considered low. The most common injuries occur in the lower limbs, particularly the ankle. Medical care is provided by the brigade’s Health Detachment and the Vila Militar Garrison Hospital.

== Organization ==
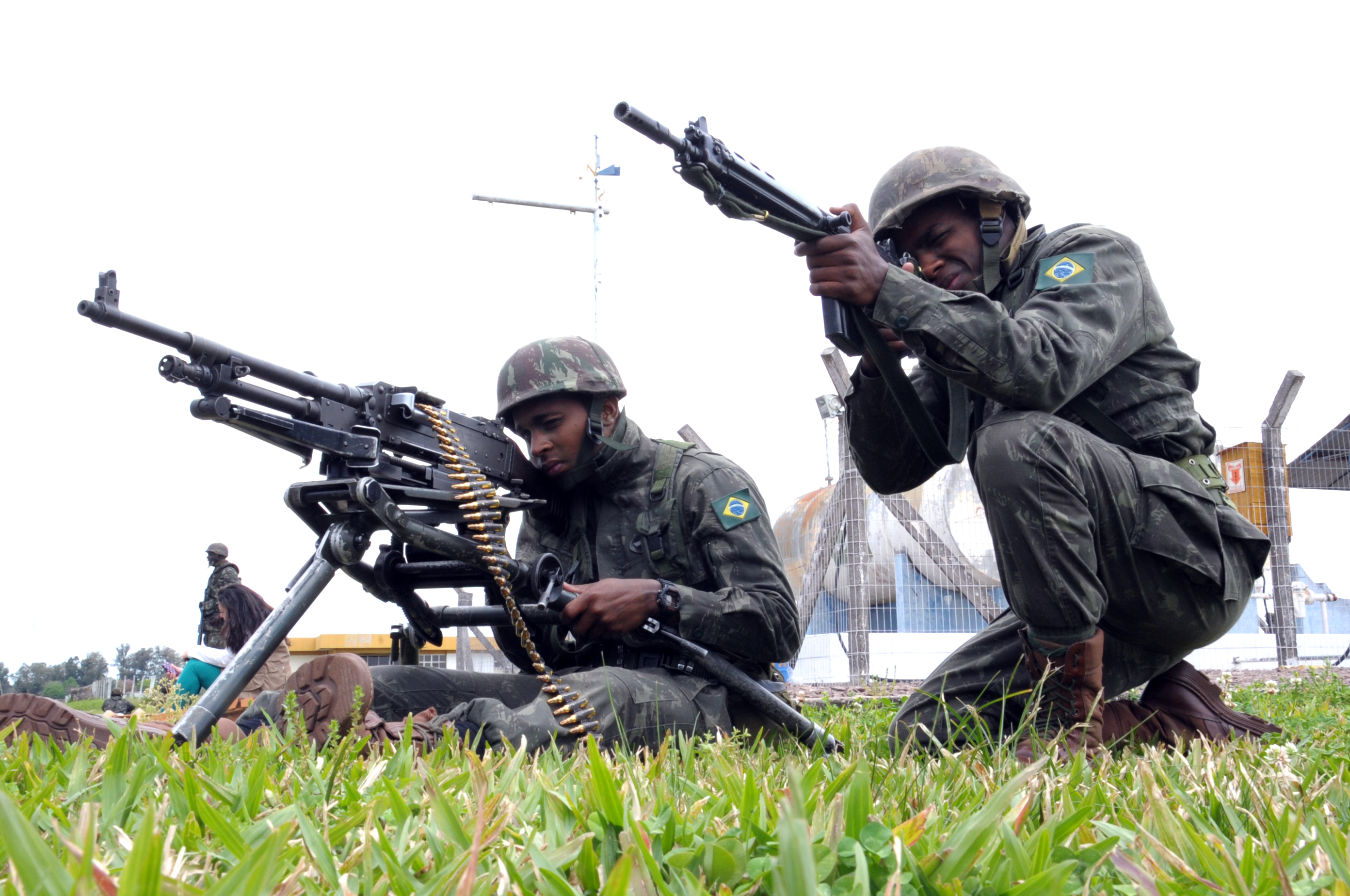
Machine gun position of paratroopers in exercises in Rio Grande do Sul

The brigade is subordinated to the Eastern Military Command, in Rio de Janeiro, but can be directly deployed by the Land Operations Command in Brasília. It was structured during the military dictatorship's reforms in a manner similar to infantry and motorized infantry brigades: three infantry battalions as the main maneuver units, a cavalry squadron, and support organizations. Each paratrooper infantry battalion serves as the core component of a task force. The 26th Battalion, known as "Santos Dumont", is the most prestigious of the three. Officers and sergeants are trained at the General Penha Brasil Paratrooper Instruction Center, while corporals and soldiers receive their training partly at the center and partly in the military units where they serve. Reserved spots at the center are available for personnel from the Brazilian Navy, Air Force, and foreign countries. Since the exceptional case of Hugo de Abreu, all commanders have been veteran paratroopers. All subordinate units are located in Rio de Janeiro.

The 1st Paratrooper Cavalry Squadron is a unique category within cavalry. It was established in 1981 as a motorized force, equipped with jeeps and motorcycles, with the intention of eventually adopting armored vehicles. Successful airdrop tests were conducted with the EE-3 Jararaca from Engesa, but the squadron only adopted armored vehicles in December 2021, when the VBTP-MR Guarani was delivered. The Guarani is employed in anti-tank missile sections and can be air-transported by the C-130 Hercules and C-390. Paratrooper artillery uses the OTO Melara Mod 56 howitzer, which is easily dismantled and delivered by parachute. Initially, there was no anti-aircraft artillery battery, unlike motorized brigades, due to the assumption that an airborne assault would only occur under conditions of air superiority. Nevertheless, the 21st Anti-Aircraft Artillery Battery was transferred to the Brigade in 2004.

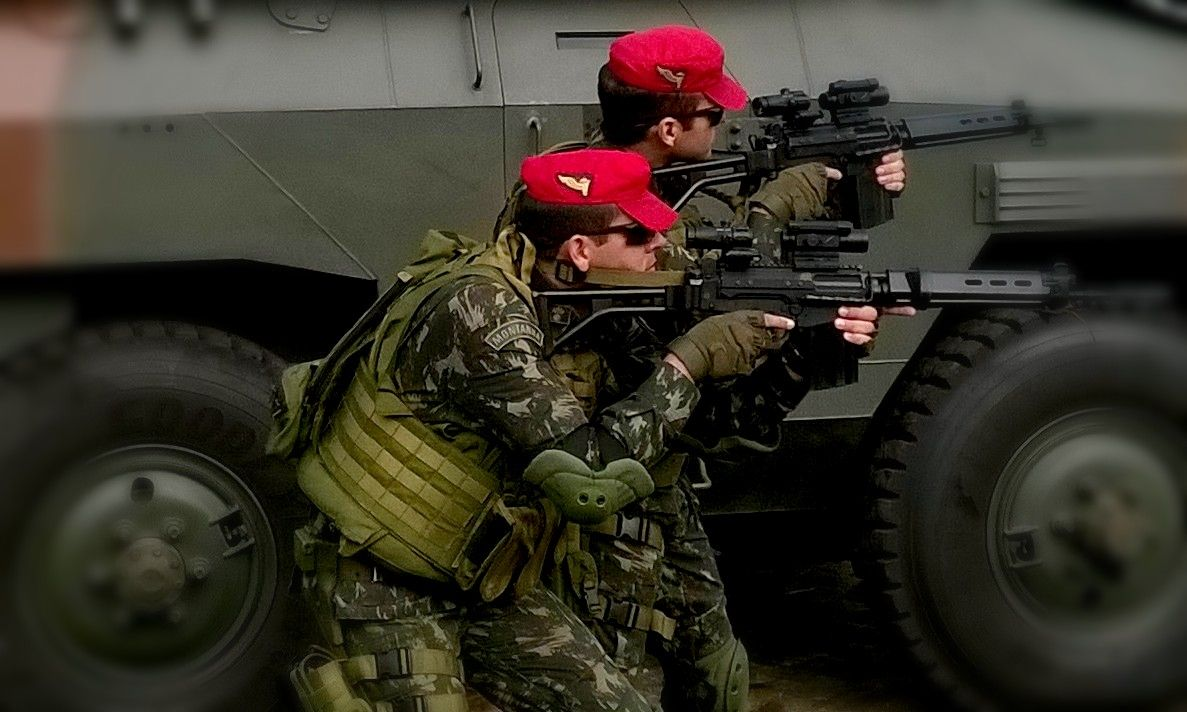
Paratrooper pathfinders

The Parachute Folding, Maintenance, and Air Supply Battalion (DOMPSA) and the Paratrooper Pathfinder Company are also unique to the brigade, both with their own specialized courses. The battalion includes officers and sergeants from the Quartermaster Corps and is responsible for air-dropping supplies, as well as maintaining parachutes and other airborne equipment. Pathfinders jump ahead of the main force, manage drop zones, assist in reorganizing descending paratroopers, conduct reconnaissance, and gather intelligence. Since the separation of the Special Operations Brigade, the pathfinders have become the elite of the paratrooper force.

Military organizations subordinate to the brigade
- Paratrooper Infantry Brigade Command
- Paratrooper Infantry Brigade Command Company
- 25th Paratrooper Infantry Battalion
- 26th Paratrooper Infantry Battalion
- 27º Paratrooper Infantry Battalion
- 8th Parachute Field Artillery Group
- 20th Parachute Logistics Battalion
- Parachute Folding, Maintenance and Air Supply Battalion (B DOMPSA)
- Paratrooper Pathfinder Company
- 1st Parachute Cavalry Squadron
- 21st Parachute Anti-Aircraft Artillery Battery
- 1st Parachute Combat Engineering Company
- 20th Parachute Communications Company
- 36th Parachute Army Police Platoon
- General Penha Brasil Instruction Center
- Parachute Health Detachment

== Gallery ==
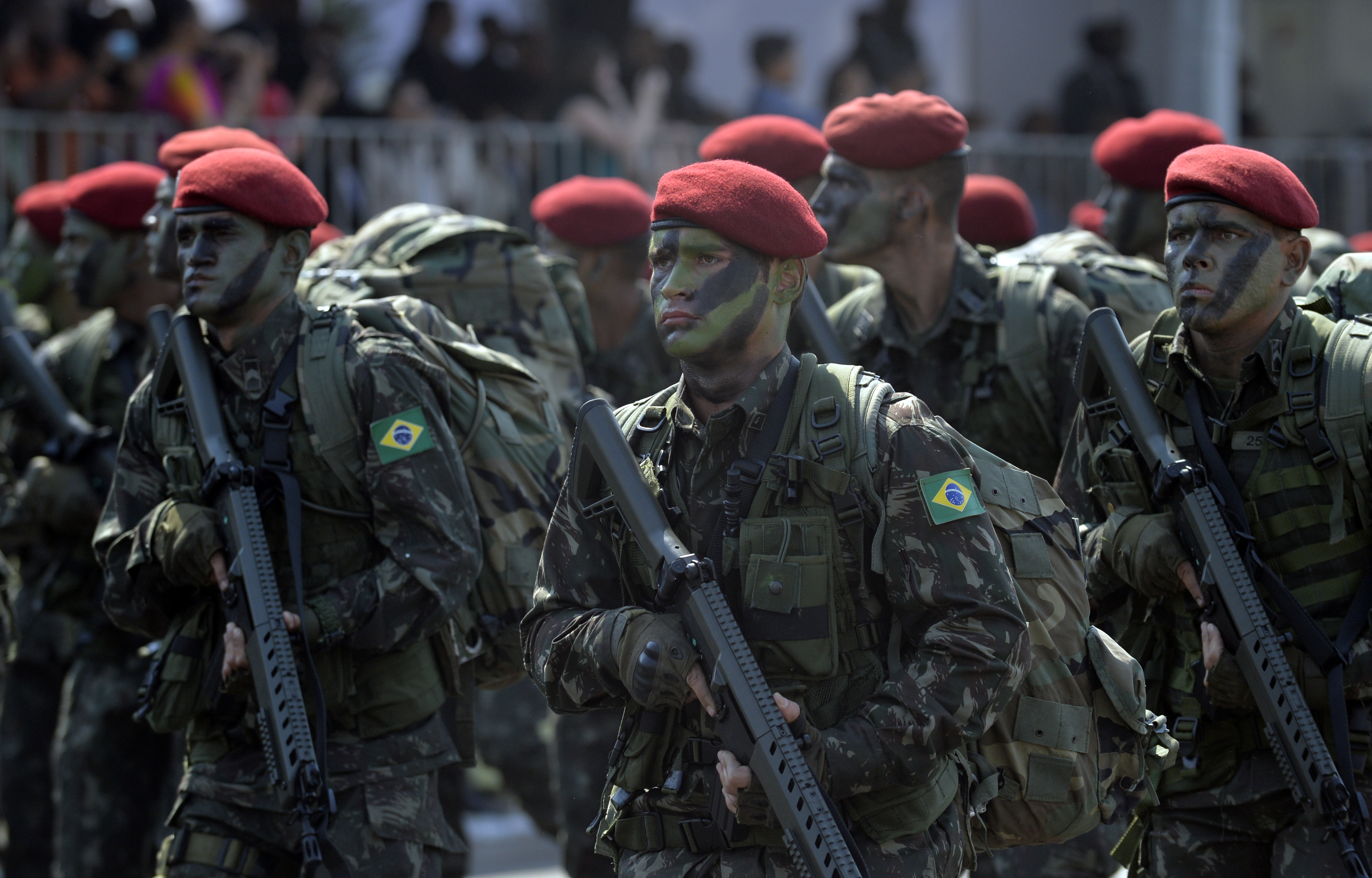
Paratroopers at the 2015 Independence Day parade

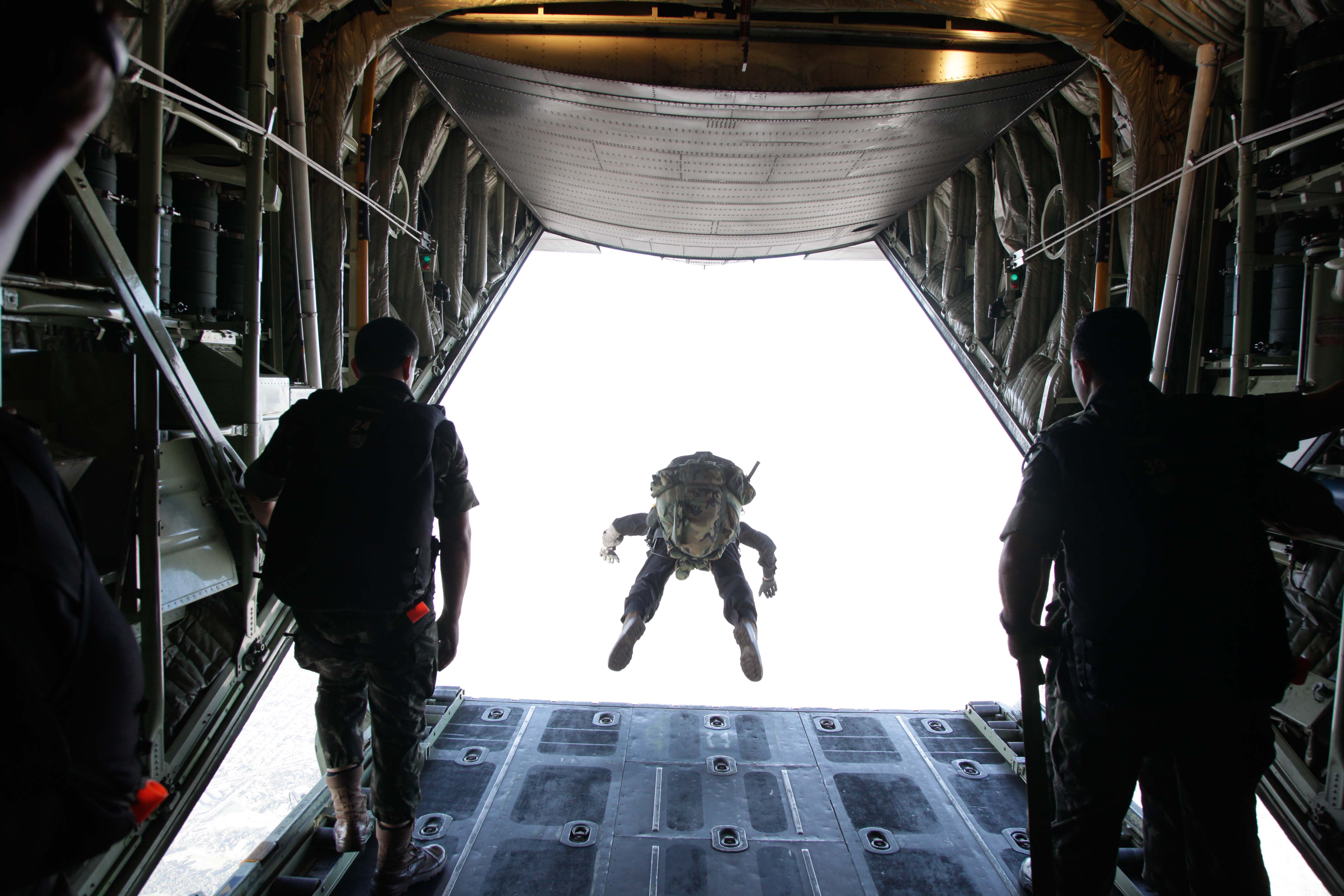
Parachute jump

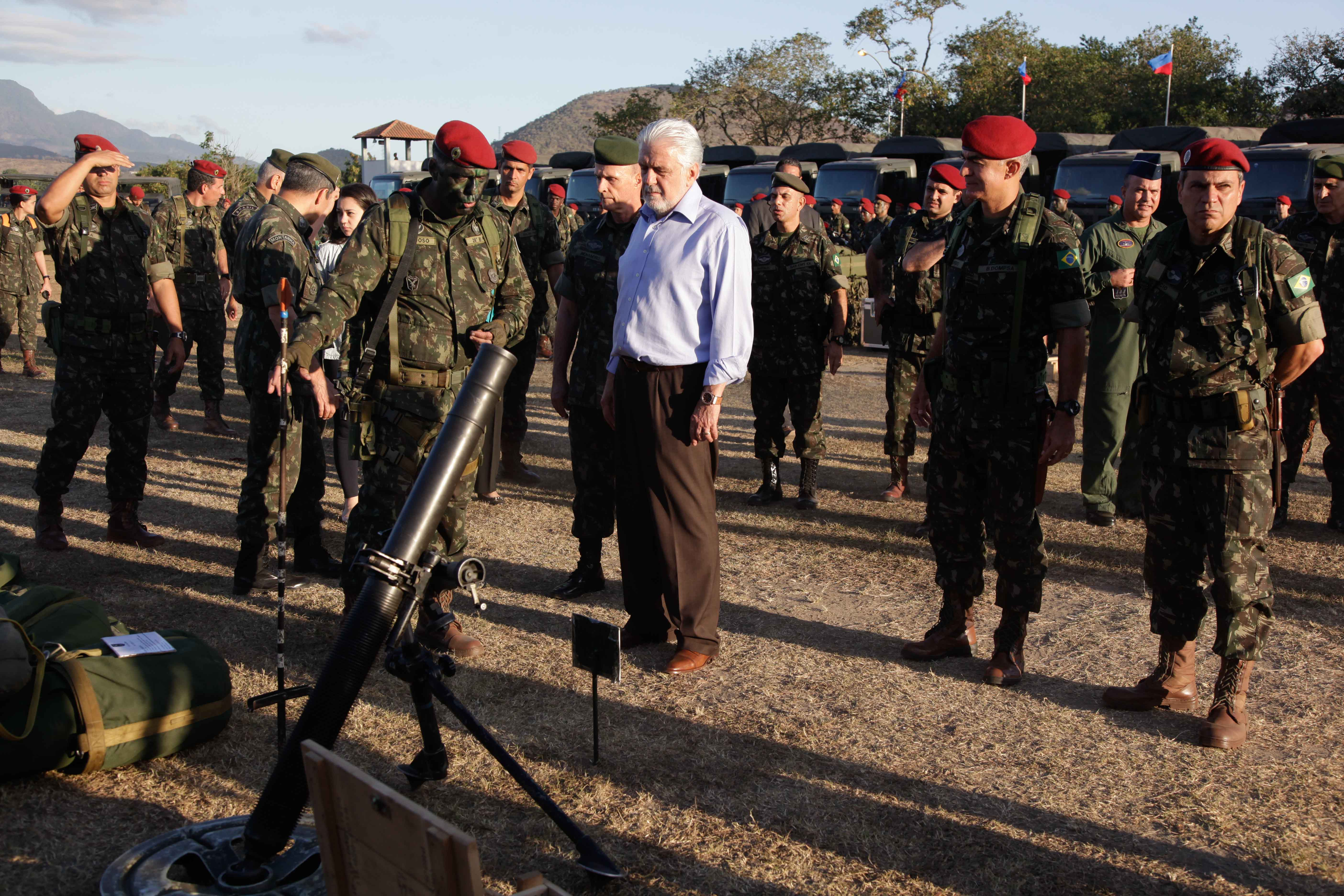
Then Defense Minister Jaques Wagner inspecting the 26th Paratrooper Infantry Battalion

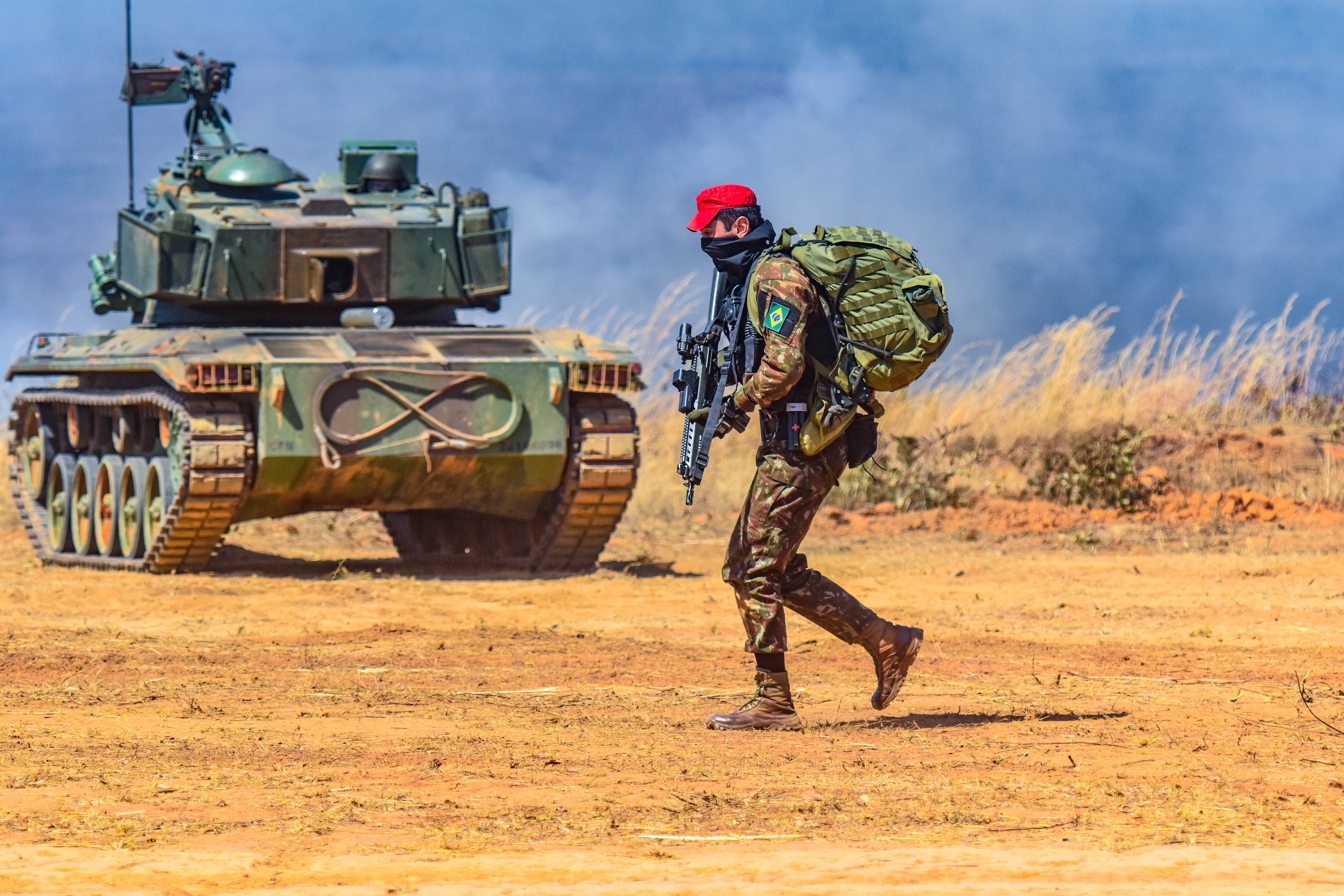
A paratrooper pathfinder during Operation Formosa in 2021

== See also ==
- Jair Bolsonaro, former president of Brazil and former member of the brigade;
- List of military special forces units.
