= Military apparatus during the João Goulart government =

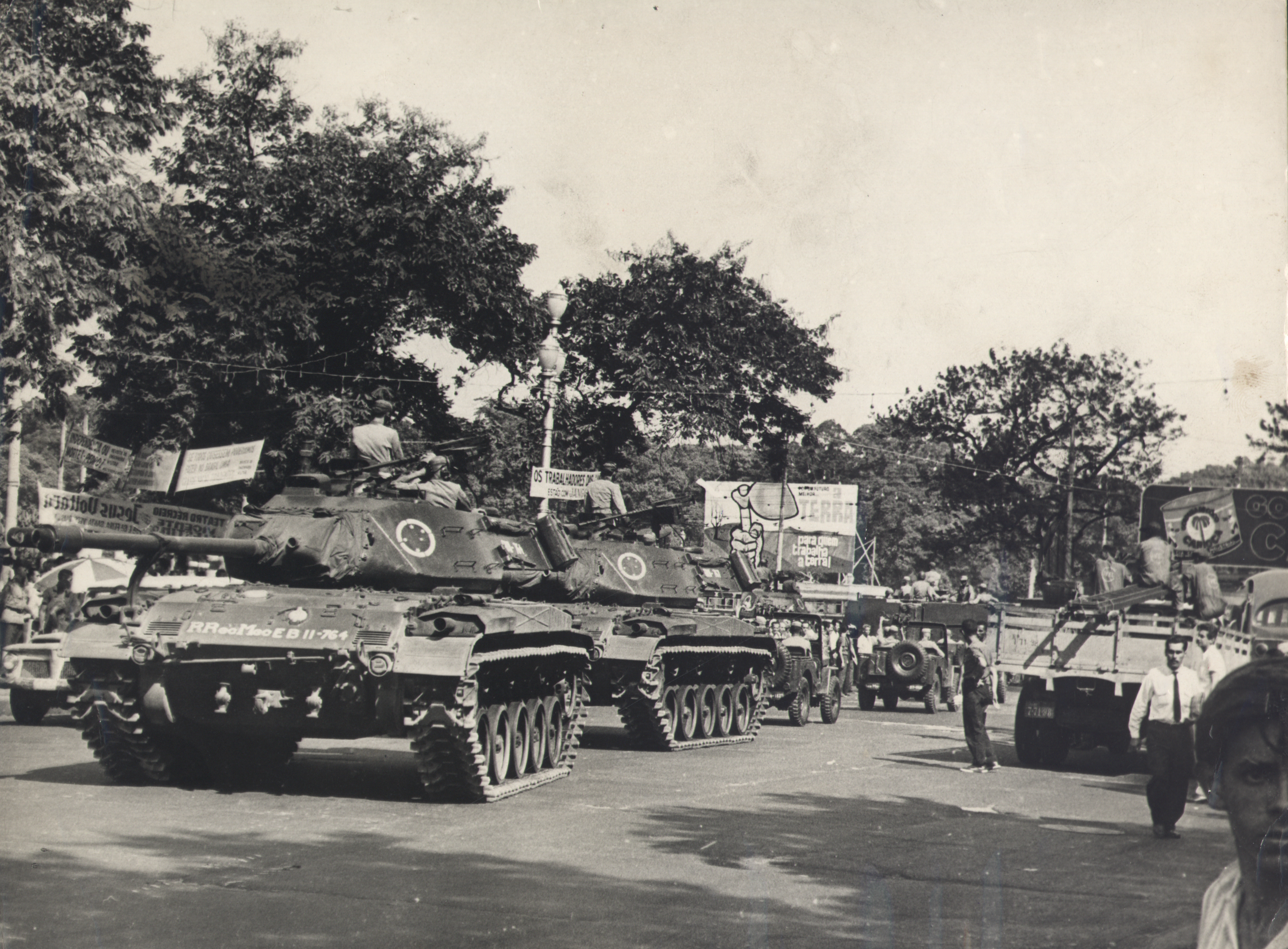
Army tanks provide security at the Central Rally. (Note: Correio da Manhã, 14/03/1964, According Carderno. An opinion about the relationship between the military device and security at rallies is expressed in Motta 2003, Tomo 1, pp. 230-231.)

The term "military apparatus" refers to a policy of appointing officers of the Brazilian Armed Forces during the government of João Goulart (1961-1964), consisting of favoring, in promotions and nominations to important commands, military officers considered reliable. It is considered the work of the head of the President's Military Cabinet, Argemiro de Assis Brasil, who, however, later denied its existence. The filling of the high commands with loyal officers was supposed to assure the president's mandate and was considered relevant both within the government and the opposition. However, it did not prevent the deposition of Goulart in the 1964 coup d'état, which was joined by members of the "apparatus", some of whom had participated in the preceding conspiracy.

== Goulart's military politics ==
The governing authorities use various strategies to mitigate the risk posed by the military to their power. In Brazil, where the presence of officers willing to overthrow the government was continuous, every president needed to set up his military apparatus to secure his mandate. Thus, appointments and promotions have always had a political character, and the weak Executive turned to the military to strengthen itself in a divided scenario. The favoritism and punishment followed the criteria of the civil authorities, "in disregard of the institution", which became accentuated during the administration of General Henrique Teixeira Lott in the War Ministry and reached a climax in the Goulart government. Conspiratorial activity was known to be going on in the barracks, although Goulart and his circle did not identify its sources. In addition, he used military support in the political game, as in the anticipation of the plebiscite on parliamentarism and the request for a state of exception.

Between 1961 and 1964, the percentage of officers promoted to the generalate and who had graduated ahead of their classes in military schools decreased. This evidences a patrimonialist strategy of maintaining military loyalty, in which the ruler assumes more personal control over his officers' careers. The attention given to the military apparatus and the appointment of ruling commanders was visible even in early 1963, with the return to Goulart's full presidential powers. In August, Goulart called General Assis Brasil to deal with the apparatus, which was disorganized by the changes in commands and the political situation. Appointed chief of the President's Military Cabinet in September, he participated in a meeting in Goiás to evaluate the balance of military forces. He set up an autonomous system of contact with the commands. The focus of the appointments was Rio de Janeiro, São Paulo, and Porto Alegre.

The device was set up with the Minister of War and the commanders of the First, Second, and Third Armies, reinforced, in the lower ranks, by the support of lieutenants, sergeants, and cabos. By the end of March 1964, the important commands appeared to be in the hands of generals loyal to the government. Meanwhile, potential or probable conspirators were in the reserves, like Golbery do Couto e Silva, without command, like Cordeiro de Farias, or in non-command positions, like Orlando and Ernesto Geisel, Costa e Silva and Castelo Branco. Most of the generals involved in the 1964 coup had been passed over for promotion, while many of the legalists purged after Goulart's deposition had been privileged during his tenure.

This personnel policy may have been counterproductive. The practices of sending unwanted officers to remote garrisons and passing over their promotions in favor of less qualified but more loyal ones only increased resentment against the government.

José Murilo de Carvalho notes that Goulart nominated unreliable generals for important positions. Even though there was control over the commands with generals, which was pronounced in Guanabara, lower ranking officers could be drawn into the conspiracy; for then-Colonel Carlos de Meira Mattos, "from Lieutenant colonel on down, everyone was with us". In the words of then Lieutenant-Colonel Adyr Fiúza de Castro, "we were undermining at the level of captain, major, and colonel". There is thus the interpretation that effectively the "military apparatus" did not exist, and after the coup its existence was denied by Assis Brasil.

== Regional commands ==
Jair Dantas Ribeiro

The Minister of War was changed frequently. João de Segadas Viana was succeeded by Nélson de Melo, who in September 1962, in the midst of the anticipated parliamentary plebiscite, was replaced by Amaury Kruel, a personal friend of the president. In June 1963, with the ministerial renewal, the three military ministers were substituted. The Army then fell to Jair Dantas Ribeiro, an ally during the campaign for anticipation. The practice of changing ministers when they disagreed deprived the president of accurate information about feelings in the military, it prevented each minister from consolidating his military scheme and, by leading to a series of changes in command, upset the officers who lost their posts.

Rio de Janeiro, with its concentration of military force, was the primary destination for reliable officers. The Ministry of War was there, with the entire chain of command guaranteed. In March 1964, General Armando de Moraes Ancora commanded there, below Dantas Ribeiro, a supporter of the president, in the First Army, who was "a friend of the minister, a disciplined soldier". Further down, in the 1st Infantry Division, based in Vila Militar, was Oromar Osório, one of the "people's generals", a nickname also applied to Osvino Ferreira Alves, Âncora's predecessor. In the Navy, there was Vice Admiral Cândido Aragão, commander of the Marine Corps. The concentration of the apparatus in Guanabara made it impossible for it to be the starting point for the coup, but it also ended up allowing less reliable officers to take over in other states.

In the Second Army, in São Paulo, General Peri Constant Bevilacqua, "of moderately leftist ideas", was dismissed in November 1962 after allying with the opposition governor Ademar de Barros against the General Workers' Command, which was moving closer to the president. General Kruel took his place. For Navy Captain Ivo Corseuil, head of the Federal Intelligence and Counterintelligence Service in 1964, this was a mistake, since Kruel was unreliable and had participated in the 1954 Colonels' Manifesto against Goulart. One of his subordinates, General Euryale de Jesus Zerbini, of the Divisionary Infantry in Caçapava, was also part of the device. Corseuil has an identical negative assessment of the appointment of Joaquim Justino Alves Bastos to the command of the Fourth Army, in Recife. In fact, on the eve of the coup both Kruel and Justino had already been involved in the conspiratorial activity.

Third Army, in Porto Alegre, was with Jair Dantas Ribeiro. Later, as Minister of War, he endorsed the nomination of Benjamim Rodrigues Galhardo to the post, against the opinion of the entire National Security Council. For Corseuil, it was a disastrous choice, and the right thing to do would have been to nominate General Ladário Pereira Telles. Still, Galhardo was considered loyal. The conspiracy was present within his own headquarters, although he did not participate.

== The "apparatus" at the moment of the coup ==
Assis Brasil, very optimistic, assured the president that he could act on the strength of the "famous" or "praised" (Note: The first term is used in Tibola 2007, p. 91, and the second in Gaspari 2014.) military apparatus. The conspirators expected it to offer considerable resistance, and were surprised to see it quickly crumble, with most of the military joining the coup and even legalists not offering resistance. In retrospect, the military assess that Assis Brasil lacked strong figures and the number of disgruntled officers was very large.

Minister Jair was hospitalized, disbanding the military dome. Kruel and Justino joined the coup with their Armies after noting the "direction of the wind". In the First Army, Âncora sent troops against the rebellion, but by the afternoon of the 1st the device was very disintegrated in his area and he ceased resistance. (Note: See 1964 Brazilian coup d'état in Rio de Janeiro, Operation Popeye and 1964 Brazilian coup d'état in the Paraíba Valley.) In the South, General Galhardo joined the conspiracy on the 31st. However, he accepted the nomination of the legalist General Ladário to take his post. The new incumbent ordered military deployments, but soon realized that his situation was fragile, with most of his subordinate divisions going into rebellion. On the 2nd, he received Goulart himself, who refused the offer to carry on the armed confrontation. Ladário began to obey the orders of Costa e Silva, the new Minister of War, and gave up his command.
