= 1963 request for a state of exception in Brazil =

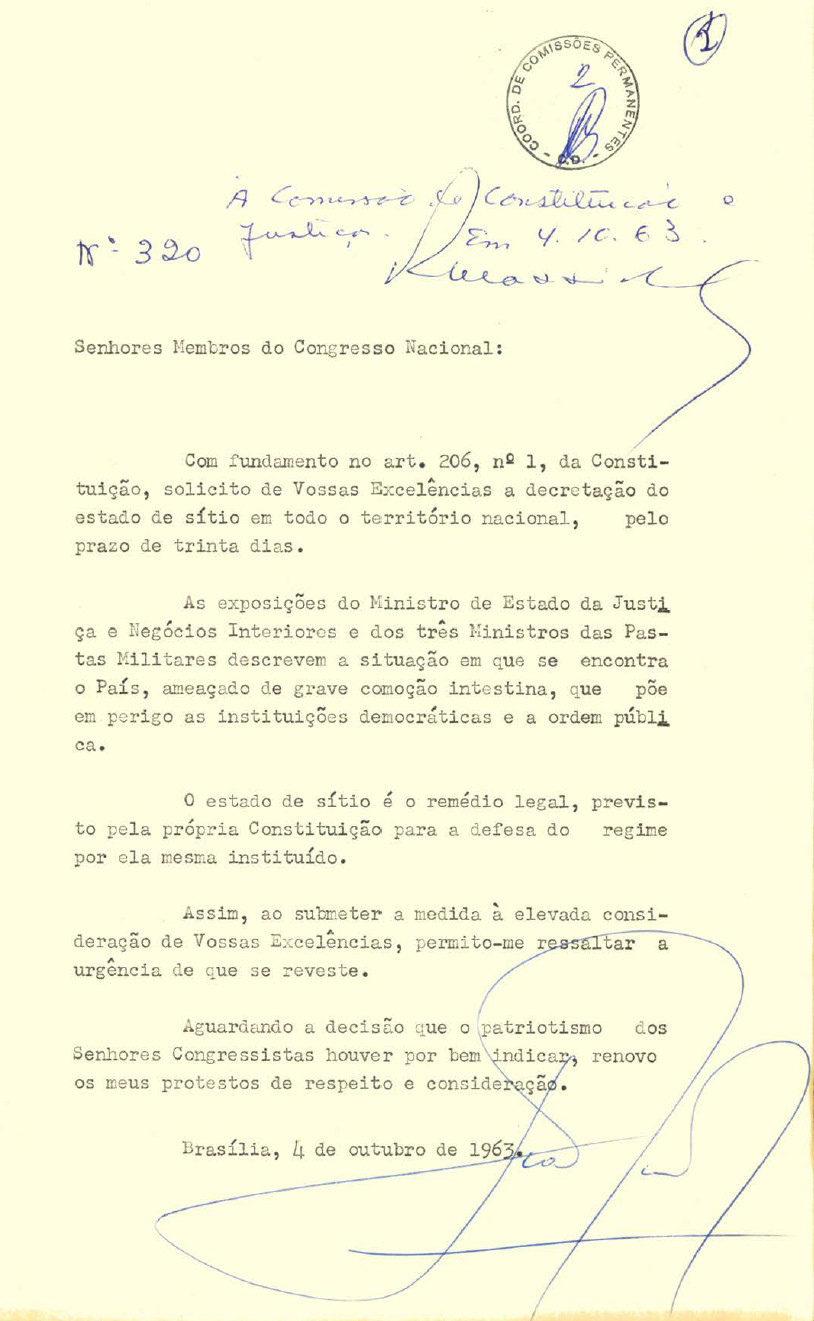
Presidential message to the Congress

On October 4, 1963, the President of Brazil João Goulart, sent to the National Congress a request for a state of exception for 30 days throughout the national territory. Citing the crisis and the threat of internal disturbances as justification, it was based on Congress's resistance to approving the reforms desired by the Executive, as well as the need to assert itself before the opposition. Its immediate antecedent was an interview by Carlos Lacerda, governor of Guanabara, to the American newspaper Los Angeles Times. Lacerda spoke explicitly of the possibility of Goulart being deposed by the military. The Ministers of War, Navy and Air Force, outraged, wanted forceful action against the governor, who was a right-wing oppositionist. The state of exception would possibly be accompanied by federal intervention in some states, and is associated with a military plan to arrest Lacerda and an operation in Pernambuco, governed by leftist Miguel Arraes, who was against the measure. The proposal was rejected by both the right and the left, who felt they could also be targeted by the exceptional powers. Without support, the President withdrew the proposal on October 7, and his political position was weakened.

== Background ==
=== Situation of the country ===
The Triennial Plan, the government's response to the existing economic crisis, was failing; inflation was strong and economic growth was slowing. For Goulart, success depended on measures such as land reform. However, his government did not have enough support in Congress to pass them, creating a stalemate between the Executive and Legislative branches. The military leadership of the government was concerned about the Army's loss of its monopoly of force and the regimentation of illegal weapons by the right wing.

Meanwhile, among the lower ranks of the military there were episodes of insubordination, notably the recent Revolt of the sergeants, which took place in Brasilia on September 12. The left was in favor of the sergeants' cause, while the officerate was very alarmed at the breakdown of the military hierarchy. In the same month, the President decreed the suspension of the operation of the Brazilian Institute of Democratic Action (IBAD), an organization that supported opposition candidates and harbored part of the coup plotting already underway against the government. Its financing had become a scandal and the object of a Parliamentary Inquiry Commission (CPI). The pressure from the strikes was significant, with one going on among the bankers at the time.

Carlos Lacerda, governor of Guanabara, was intensely critical of Goulart. His statements were supported by Ademar de Barros, governor of São Paulo, who spoke in Guaratinguetá that the government would fall by the end of the year and possibly not even the Presidential Election in Brazil in 1965 would be held.

=== Lacerda's interview to the Los Angeles Times ===
Carlos Lacerda gave an interview to Julian Hart, correspondent of the Los Angeles Times, who published it in the United States. The Tribuna da Imprensa, owned by Hélio Fernandes, published it in Brazil, initially as "the text of the telegraphic news that arrived in Brazil yesterday", on the 1st, and the next day, the full one. As assessed, "Governor Lacerda is not saying anything these days for domestic consumption. His words were directed specifically to the people of the United States." In the governor's view, "Jango will not be able to remain in power until the end of the current year. Analyzing the Brazilian crisis, Lacerda suggests to the American people to suspend economic aid to Brazil until it returns to the right rhythm."

Lacerda criticized the "labor agitation," denouncing communist infiltration of the government and the General Workers Command (CGT). He denied that Goulart was a communist; instead, he "could be called a right-wing man... for what he is in reality is a totalitarian in the South American fashion. He is a caudillo with all the resources of modern times. At the moment, he is the communist version that descends to the left." Thus, Brazil was facing a conjunction of caudillismo and communism. The group in power intended to sabotage the economy, make workers angry, and isolate the country from the free world. Law, order and freedom were threatened. Addressing the Americans, he urged them not to be indifferent to who was running the country, because "not interfering is one thing, but ignoring what is going on is another," and they should therefore play an important role in the country. For him, Goulart was "inept," "favorable to the communists," and was only in power because the military was hesitant to depose him:

Lacerda stated that his information is that military personnel are still debating whether "it is better to tutor him, sponsor him, put him under control until the end of his term (January 1966) or throw him out immediately."

On September 30 Abelardo Jurema, Minister of Justice, received a copy of the interview, which was discussed at a meeting in Goulart's cabinet. They also talked about the statements by the governor of São Paulo and the bankers' strike. The military ministers - General Jair Dantas Ribeiro, Admiral Silvio Mota and Brigadier Anísio Botelho - were indignant and, on the same day, issued a note. For them, it was an insult:

the aforementioned interviewee tries to present our country as any sub-colonial, beggarly republic, our people, a lopsided people, incapable of self-direction without foreign tutelage, handed over to a bunch of communist plunderers.

Moreover, they accused the interview of being a trigger for the outbreak of disorder, and Lacerda, of being part of a destabilization campaign through the lockout and the paralysis of the economy. They also declared that the country was threatened by right-wing and left-wing extremism.

The interview was scandalous even to the National Democratic Union (UDN) and the conservative business community. Tribuna da Imprensa considered that Lacerda's statements were untimely and ill-timed, but the reaction of the military ministers would be even worse.

== The message to Congress ==
On the 1st, the Tribuna da Imprensa reported that the First Army was on standby and the government leaders were already discussing federal intervention in Guanabara and São Paulo. The next day, government sources leaked the news of the possible declaration of a state of exception. The Correio da Manhã, on the 3rd, noted that the leadership had abandoned the idea of federal intervention for lack of a legal argument and reported the readiness of the Armed Forces.

Goulart called Leonel Brizola to get his support, without, however, making it clear what he would do. On the 4th, he sent bill no. 1,091 to Congress, accompanied by message no. 320. It requested the decree of a state of exception throughout the national territory for 30 days. The message was accompanied by a text by Abelardo Jurema and another by the three military ministers, both justifying the need for the measure, given the national situation. Goulart presented the state of exception as a way to solve the strikes, inflation and military insubordination. Minister Jurema's message described the country's crisis scenario:

The collective manifestations of indiscipline seen in the Military Police of some states, the uprising of graduates and soldiers of the Air Force and Navy in the very capital of the Republic and, more recently, acts contrary to military discipline practiced by corporals and sailors in Guanabara, all contained by the unbreakable spirit of loyalty to the Constitution and the principle of authority of our Armed Forces, are an example of the abnormality of Brazilian life. For their part, wage demands, which should be routine events in relations between employees and employers, especially in a phase, such as the present one, of renewing collective labor agreements, have become a factor in worsening the political and social crisis and serve as a pretext for the forces of reaction to conspire against democratic legality.

According to the government, there was an imminent internal commotion. Thus, the instrument resorted to article 206 of the 1946 Constitution and boldly suspended several individual rights and guarantees present in article 141, such as the manifestation of thought, secrecy of correspondence, freedom of assembly, freedom of association, bail, habeas corpus, and the right to petition.

== Motivations and interpretations of the state of exception ==
The military ministers wanted to occupy Guanabara and oust, prosecute, try or even expel Lacerda from the country. Meeting with them on the night of the 3rd, Goulart defended the alternative of declaring a state of exception and arresting Lacerda. (Note: Villa 2014: "At 10pm the president called the military ministers to explain the situation. They proposed the impeachment and subsequent expulsion from Brazil of Governor Carlos Lacerda. Jango managed to convince them that the right measure would be to adopt a state of exception. One of those present proposed arresting Lacerda instead of sending him into exile, which was accepted.") Besides Lacerda, Ademar de Barros was also targeted by the military. His removal could be popular, as he was accused of corruption and his state had the largest number of industrial workers, the President's political base.

Finally, the military ministers wanted to intervene against Miguel Arraes, the leftist governor of Pernambuco. However, according to historian Jorge Ferreira, Goulart was afraid to act against Arraes, who had supported him in the Legality Campaign. Marco Antonio Villa, on the other hand, sees an offensive against Arraes as a convenient way for Goulart to demonstrate balance, acting against both the right and the left, and, moreover, eliminating a possible rival within the left. Elio Gaspari writes that Goulart "At the very least, he would depose the governors of São Paulo and Guanabara. At most, he would also depose the leftist governor Miguel Arraes of Pernambuco."

The military wanted the request to be accepted quickly to avoid demonstrations. In the meeting with his ministers, Abelardo Jurema and Darcy Ribeiro were of the opinion that the President needed to act fast, delivering the state of exception as a fait accompli; otherwise he would fail, not having the support of the Social Democratic Party (PSD) nor the Brazilian Labor Party (PTB). Therefore, it would be necessary to put troops on the streets in Guanabara, São Paulo, and Minas Gerais, which would lead to the approval of the request within 24 hours. On the day the message was forwarded to Congress, tanks followed to the Ministry of War. However, Guanabara was not occupied and Lacerda could not be arrested.

According to Thomas Skidmore the emergency government could acquire an anti-party character, based mainly on military support, and would dismantle political mobilization, especially that of the left. Villa interprets coup character in Goulart's maneuver, comparing it to the coup attempt by Jânio Quadros and evaluating that "the democratic regime was threatened". He postulates the possibilities of dictatorship or continuism, with a change in the law to allow reelection. He cites several leftist figures. Carlos Fico disputes this interpretation, stating that the state of exception did not explicitly allow for interventions in the states and Villa's evidence is flimsy. (Note: "Villa presents no evidence about plans for intervention in these states, or rather, presents insufficient or questionable evidence, such as a statement by José Serra from 1980 and an interview of his from 1994. In 1980, Serra - who was president of the UNE in 1963 - guaranteed that interveners would be appointed in all states. In the 1994 interview, Serra said that the state of exception was presented as a coup in a meeting he attended. But, in the memoir that he published in 2014, Serra greatly relativized such statements: He revealed that Jango confided in him, in October 1963, that he knew he would not finish his mandate, that the possible coup developments were actually cogitated by Brizola, that the intervention in Pernambuco was just a suspicion he had, that Jango was not an inveterate coup-plotter and that he does not believe that Goulart "had acted enthusiastically in the making of the script that went from the state of siege to the regime of exception" (SERRA, 2014, p. 19 ).") He compares the maneuver to the anticipation of the referendum on presidentialism, in which Goulart used undue pressure (military), but not coups. For Moniz Bandeira, this was not a coup, but "an attitude of force, without transposing the constitutional space, [...] not only for the adoption of defense measures but also for the realization of the basic reforms." According to him, Goulart did not follow the revolutionary idea of Brizola, who sometimes suggested a coup - "If we don't give the coup, they will give it against us."

== Reactions ==
Most politicians, both civilian and military, thought the proposal was unilateral and the country had no internal unrest to justify the legal device of a state of exception. He was rejected both by the right, within which were his immediate targets, and by the left, which feared that it, too, would become a target. San Tiago Dantas warned Goulart that the powers of exception could be used against the workers. Among members of the Popular Mobilization Front (FMP) there was the fear that the maneuver could result in the arrests of Arraes, Luís Carlos Prestes and Brizola and the repression of strikes, just as the bankers' strike was spreading. Brizola and other leftist leaders condemned Goulart for the request over Mayrink Veiga radio. In a statement, Miguel Arraes declared that the path "cannot be that of suspending the rights and liberties that the Constitution guarantees to citizens and to the people in general. [...] the path of illegality, in the present circumstances, can lead the country to a civil war, [...] the National Congress can be closed, organizations like the CGT and the UNE can be closed"; "The basic reforms are threatened by the state of exception". For the CGT, "suppression or restriction of democratic liberties is in no way a way to give impetus to the struggle of the Brazilian people, but constitutes, on the contrary, a step backwards in our democratic process".

The PTB initially had unanimity in favor, but changed sides after the left was strongly against it. The other two major parties, the PSD and the UDN, were also against it, and thus the request could not be approved. The governors, in turn, would not accept the acts of exception, their opposition being expressed by Arraes on the left, Magalhães Pinto from Minas Gerais in the center, and Lacerda and Ademar de Barros on the right. Within the President's own cabinet, Finance Minister Carvalho Pinto was against it. The military officialdom did not like the idea of a state of exception.

As reported in the Tribuna da Imprensa, the request had bad repercussions in the financial environment. The Stock Exchange dropped six points and the price of the US dollar rose by 30 cruzeiros, with great demand and forecasts of a greater rise in the following days.

The press as a whole was against it. Tribuna da Imprensa, Estado de Minas and Folha de Minas were against the request. The Correio da Manhã also judged it unjustified. Noting that the country was returning to the starting point of Jânio Quadros' resignation, it characterized the state of exception as a way to impose a military security device, when "only an economic and financial security device will allow the complete reorganization of Brazilian life". Folha de S. Paulo, also contrary, associated the situation to the Estado Novo. O Globo agreed with the logic of the military ministers and evaluated that, since the Constitution cannot be changed during a state of siege, it would be a maneuver by the ministers against land reform. Ultima Hora gave space to the military's arguments.

Among the few who approved the measure was the National Resistance, an organization of trade unionists and liberal professionals. Its manifesto criticized the radical unionists and the coup-plotting right wing.

== Related events ==
=== Denunciation of military plan against Lacerda ===
In the early morning of the 4th Goulart traveled to Brasília to present the proposal, while Carlos Lacerda was to visit construction sites during the morning, starting with the Miguel Couto Hospital at 06:00 am. On the 6th, O Estado de S. Paulo reported that on the day of the request, the Nucleus of the Airborne Division had prepared a frustrated attempt against the governor of Guanabara. According to the report, the Nucleus commander, General Alfredo Pinheiro Soares Filho, conferred with the President. Then, accompanied by Lieutenant Colonel Abelardo Alvarenga Mafra, he went to his Artillery group at 03:00 in the morning. He asked his commander, Lieutenant-Colonel Francisco Boaventura Cavalcante, to move his men to the hospital to attack Lacerda, who would be there at 06:15. Cavalcante replied that he would only act on written orders. Colonel Aragão, commander of the Parachute Regiment, also refused. Finally, it was possible to use the troops of the Engineering Company, but even then there were many disagreements. Mafra had alleged that Goulart had decreed a state of exception ad referendum by Congress and started a military intervention in Guanabara. The force began its move along Niemeyer Avenue, but was delayed by a traffic accident, and the operation failed. Inside the Nucleus, the officers demanded clarification, and General Pinheiro admitted that the Minister of War had ordered Lacerda's arrest. The event reached the governor's ears.

According to Jorge Ferreira, the command was plotted "in a mysterious nocturnal meeting at the Laranjeiras Palace, [by] unidentified sectors, with presidential orders," so that the country would dawn with Lacerda arrested "and the state of exception decreed de facto. However, leftist sergeants pressed for the operation to be sabotaged, which was also done by the officers. When he arrived at the hospital, Lacerda had already been warned and had fled. Carlos Lacerda recalls that Lieutenant Colonel Cavalcante himself telephoned his Secretary of Security to denounce the case. Thomas Skidmore attributed the warning to dissident officers. Moniz Bandeira, citing testimony from Mafra himself, attributes this warning to a "major, a friend of Lacerda's." Elio Gaspari attributes the operation to the government's military device and emphasizes the delay caused by the paratroop commanders' refusals to participate.

General Pinheiro denied that the displacement had Lacerda as a target; "everything was only 'a training test', 'an exercise', because he 'wanted to feel the troop's spirit'". The opposition clamored for a CPI, but the issue was forgotten. Also in October, an Army syndication cleared the accused, concluding that the displacement was routine. In June 1964, an investigation by the Federal Intelligence and Counterintelligence Service (SFICI) into Goulart's war minister assessed as true the operation against Lacerda and cited a statement by General Pinheiro in which he attributed the order to the minister.

=== Military movement in Recife ===
"There was so much publicity around this occurrence [with Lacerda] that it ended up diverting attention to a similar fact that occurred with Miguel Arraes at that same moment." General Justino Alves Bastos, commander of the Fourth Army, tried to prevent a rally of thirty thousand peasants who were to come to Recife on the 6th. He deployed the 14th Infantry Regiment and the 1st Group of the 7th Obuse Regiment, surrounding the Palácio das Princesas, seat of the state government. Justino was decorated with the Comenda do Mérito Aeronáutico on the 23rd. His operation was praised by the Minister of War and by the President.

Marco Antonio Villa associates this operation with Miguel Arraes' speech against the state of exception. Thomas Skidmore comments that "the preparations in Pernambuco were even more rudimentary than those in Guanabara, and the whole plot came to nothing". Carlos Fico, who calls Lacerda's case "an old and badly told affair," sees what happened at the Palácio das Princesas as the most suspicious military operation at that time.

== Follow-up ==
Without political or popular support, the President gave up and on October 7 withdrew the message. Thus, the state of exception did not come to a vote. There was still the possibility of articulation with the PSD, but Goulart did not want to go ahead without the popular forces.

The failure of the request and the maneuver against Lacerda weakened the government. The President's authority was diminished. His lack of support in Congress and inability to activate the military force option was evident. The participants of the conspiracy that would lead to the 1964 coup were alarmed by the measure and accelerated their articulations. Its repercussion, together with that of the Revolt of the sergeants, fed the belief of the coup plotters that Goulart intended to take power, and they received adhesions from other military personnel and civilians. Until the end of his government, the state of exception was remembered as an undemocratic act.
