= Aragarças Revolt =

Attempted military coup against Juscelino Kubitschek in Brazil

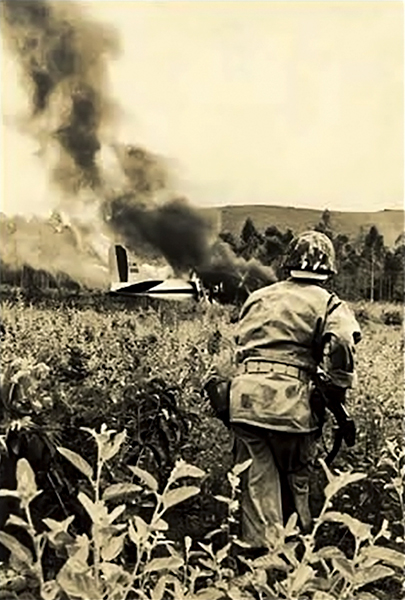
- A rebel plane on fire
Date	2–4 December 1959
Location	Aragarças, Goiás, Brazil

Belligerents
Federal Government	Military personnel linked to the Jacareacanga Revolt

Commanders and leaders
Henrique Teixeira Lott	Haroldo Veloso

The Aragarças Revolt, known locally as Revoltoso do Veloso, was an attempted military coup against Brazilian president Juscelino Kubitschek from 2 to 4 December 1959. Mainly carried out by Air Force and Army officers linked to a previous revolt against the government, the Jacareacanga Revolt, the attempt carried out the first plane hijacking in the history of Brazil, but was quickly suppressed.

The coup attempt aimed to overthrow Juscelino Kubitschek and establish a military dictatorship in the country. The coup plotters, 18 people in total, predicted that they would receive support from the armed forces and politicians linked to the National Democratic Union (UDN), the opposition party, but this did not happen and it was quelled within 36 hours. The rebels fled to neighboring countries and nobody was killed.

== Background ==
The revolt was orchestrated by the self-styled Revolutionary Command, which brought together officers from the Brazilian Air Force (FAB) and the Army, totaling fifteen people in total, in addition to three civilians, led by major aviator Haroldo Coimbra Veloso and lieutenant colonel João Paulo Moreira Burnier, against the then president of Brazil, Juscelino Kubitschek. Some of the military officers, like Veloso, had already attempted a coup in 1956, which became known as the Jacareacanga Revolt. They were amnestied, but had been planning a new revolt since 1957.

The revolt was triggered by Jânio Quadros' sudden decision to withdraw his candidacy for the 1960 presidential election. Quadros was supported by the UDN. The coup plotters thought that Quadros' decision would cause Kubitschek to succeed in electing a successor, thus allowing the PSD-PTB alliance to remain in power. The alliance was heir to Getulism and Laborism and had been in power since 1946, but the armed forces wanted the country to be governed by the opposition party, the UDN.

Furthermore, there were rumors that Juscelino Kubitschek was negotiating a constitutional amendment that would allow his re-election and that the governor of Rio Grande do Sul, Leonel Brizola, was orchestrating a coup to prevent Quadros' possible victory and establish a socialist dictatorship in the country. Among the accusations was that Brizola threatened to take to the wall "those who gloated about the misery of the people".

== Events ==
=== Kidnappings ===
The revolt began on 2 December 1959, when ten men led by Haroldo Veloso and João Paulo Moreira Burnier stole three C-47 model planes full of weapons and explosives from the Galeão Air Base, in Rio de Janeiro. A few hours later, major Eber Teixeira Pinto hijacked a Constellation commercial plane from Panair as it flew over Barreiras, in Bahia. The plane had taken off from Santos Dummont airport, in Rio de Janeiro, and was heading to Manaus carrying 46 people, 38 passengers and 8 crew, including senator Remy Archer, Globo reporter José Ribamar Castello Branco, the niece of general Henrique Lott, and the president of Banco da Amazônia. This was the first hijacking of an aircraft in Brazil. Then, five men led by major Washington Mascarenhas hijacked a Beechcraft D-18 owned by Companhia Estanífera do Brasil that was at Pampulha airport, in Belo Horizonte.

The C-47s and Beechcraft landed in Aragarças, where they waited for the Constellation to arrive. The rebel's objective was to bomb the Laranjeiras and Catete palaces, in Rio de Janeiro, and occupy the bases of Santarém, Aragarças, Xingu, Cachimbo and Jacareacanga. The landing site was chosen with the aim of spreading the group's ideals, as it was a geographically important center for officers and an air route. The rebels expected that the military and politicians linked to the UDN would join the coup, and that Juscelino Kubitschek would declare a state of emergency, thus preventing the 1960 presidential election. Furthermore, Veloso knew the city and was close friends with many of its residents. The hostages were taken to the Grande Hotel, and the rebels spread branches and barrels of fuel on the city's airstrip to prevent more planes from arriving. The city was besieged and communications were cut.

=== Reactions ===
The following day, the newspaper Repórter Esso reported that the plane had crashed. In Rio de Janeiro, senator Victorino Freire took the stand at the Monroe Palace to present the situation, but was interrupted by senators Otávio Mangabeira and Afonso Arinos, who had received a manifesto from the Revolutionary Command announcing the plane's hijacking. The manifesto called the Executive Branch as corrupt, the Legislative Branch as demagogic and the Judiciary as omissive. Furthermore, it stated that Brazil was about to fall to communism, infiltrated in the government.

The coup attempt was widely rejected by names linked to the government, such as Lameira Bittencourt, and the opposition, such as João Vilas Boas. Carlos Lacerda was not only against the coup, but also denounced the Minister of War, general Lott. Among others who were against it were Caiado de Castro and Lima Teixeira.

Despite this, some politicians linked to the UDN supported the coup. Otávio Mangabeira compared the rebels with Tiradentes, Deodoro da Fonseca and Getúlio Vargas. Afonso Arinos compared the event to the Copacabana Fort revolt. Among others who gave support were Daniel Krieger. Burnier expected at least 300 men to join the coup, but only 34 people joined, which was reduced to 15 at the end of the revolt. No garrison joined the coup plotters.

=== Counterattack ===
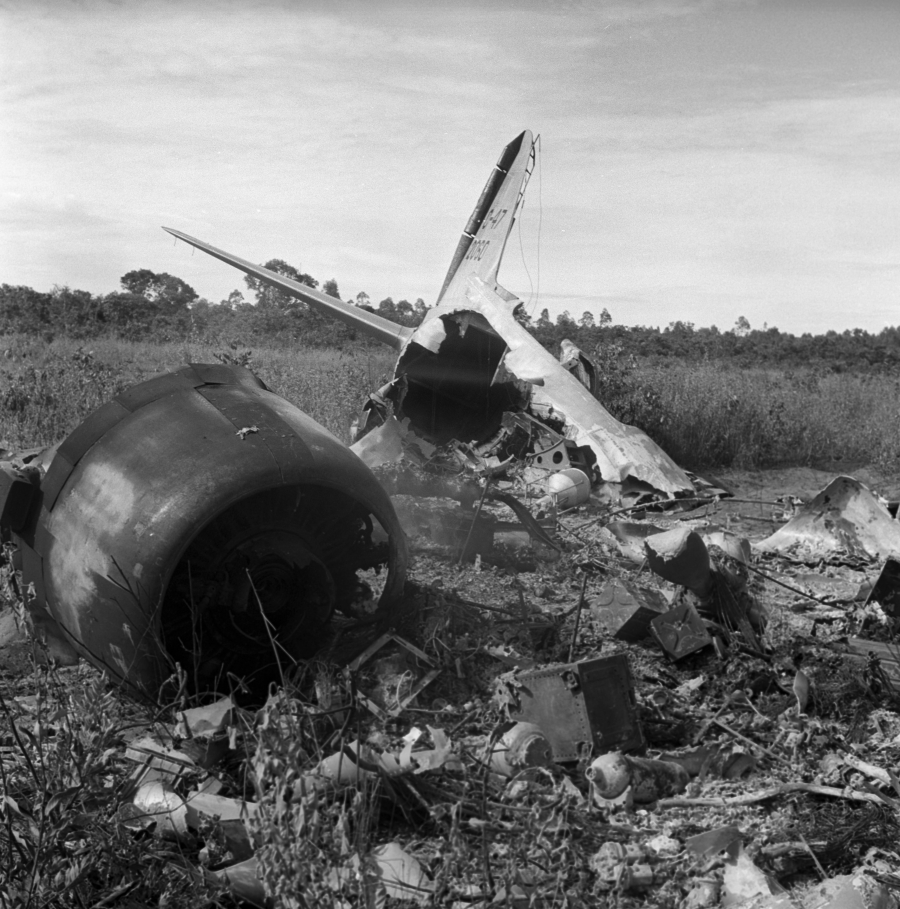
C-47 plane set on fire by government paratroopers

On 4 December, general Lott sent paratroopers to Aragarças, who machine-gunned the tail of one of the C-47 planes, which was returning from an inspection flight in Mato Grosso, and the fuel barrels were bombed. The rebels fled with the other planes to Argentina, Paraguay and Bolivia, and the hostages were released in Buenos Aires. The uprising was put down within 36 hours and nobody was killed. Residents reported that the smoke took weeks to dissipate, and there was a strong smell of burning flesh, even though there were no fatalities.

== Aftermath ==
Unlike what had happened in the Jacareacanga Revolt, Kubitschek did not grant amnesty to the rebels. An inquiry was opened to investigate the possible participation of marshal Castelo Branco, who would later become president of Brazil after the 1964 military coup d'état, as a true organizer of the coup plotters, but it was quickly archived. Kubitschek tried to extradite the rebels, but failed due to the lack of agreements with the countries involved. He also tried to prosecute them criminally and threatened to dismiss them from the armed forces if they did not return. There was a legal discussion as to whether the case was a riot or a revolt, which would imply a milder sentence. The coup plotters returned to Brazil during the Jânio Quadros government.

According to journalist Wagner William, Kubitschek expected the country to become ungovernable if the UDN did not come to power, and launched general Lott as a candidate for the 1960 presidential election, despite knowing that he would lose. Kubitschek predicted that the UDN would not provide a good government because of the economic crisis and would wear out. A few days after the revolt, Jânio Quadros announced that he would again run for the 1960 election. Quadros went on to win it, but unexpectedly resigned from office in August 1961. Quadros' resignation triggered a crisis centered around vice president João Goulart, which ultimately led to the 1964 coup d'état that installed the military dictatorship in Brazil.

== See also ==
- List of coups and coup attempts
