= Eastern Military Command (Brazil) =

- Comando Militar do Leste
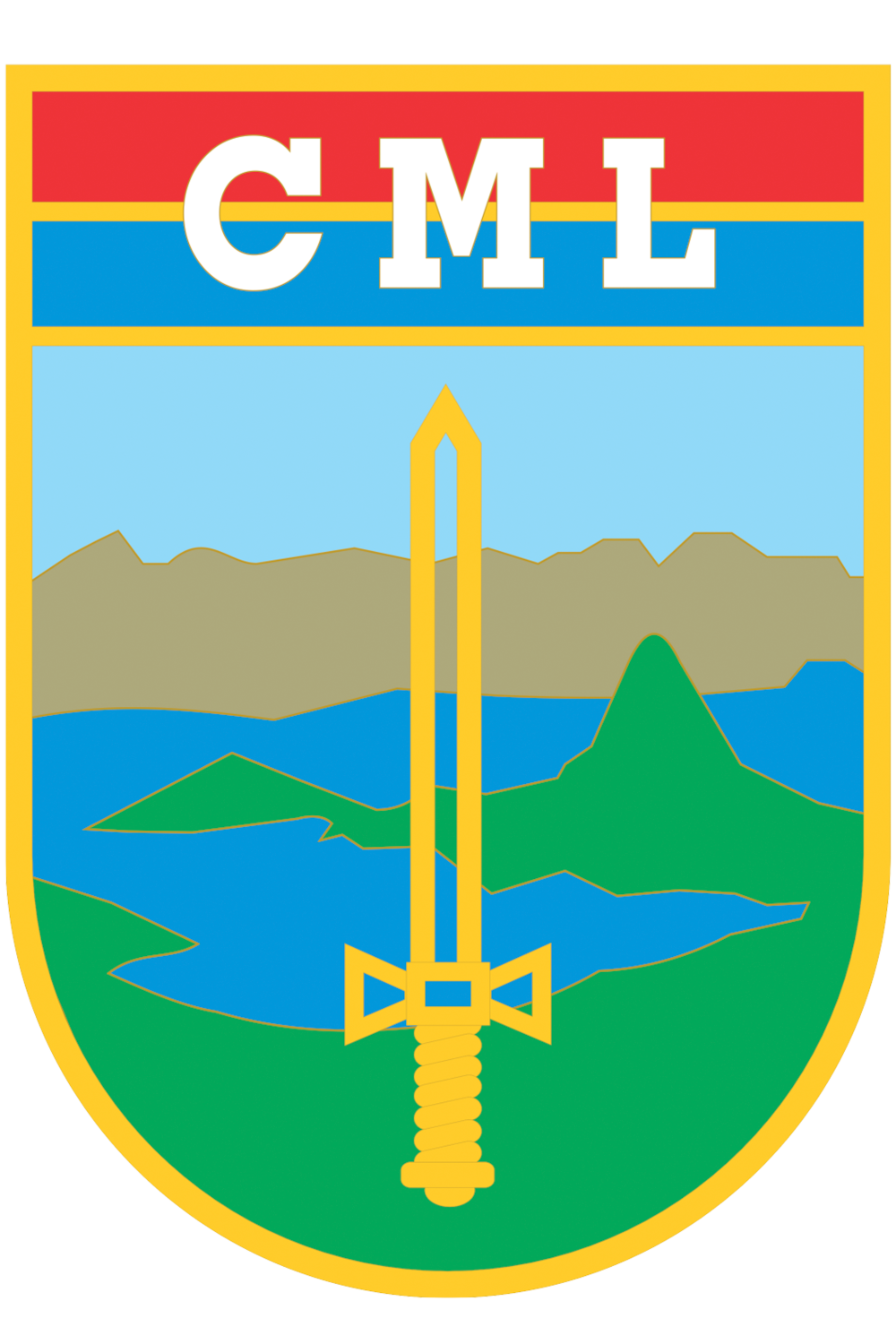
- Emblem of the Eastern Military Command
- Active: 1946; 80 years ago
- Country: Brazil
- Branch: Brazilian Army
- Part of: Ministry of Defence
- Garrison/HQ: Rio de Janeiro
- Nickname: CML
- Website: www.cml.eb.mil.br

The Eastern Military Command (Portuguese: Comando Militar do Leste or CML) is one of eight Military Commands of the Brazilian Army. The Eastern Military Command is responsible for the defense of the states Rio de Janeiro, Minas Gerais, and Espírito Santo. A Parachutist Brigade (Brigada de Infantaria Paraquedista) and two Infantry Brigades are assigned to the 1st Army Division, which is the maneuver unit of the CML. Two Military Regional Commands are subordinated to the CML for administrative purposes.

== Organization ==
Area of the Comando Militar do Leste 2017

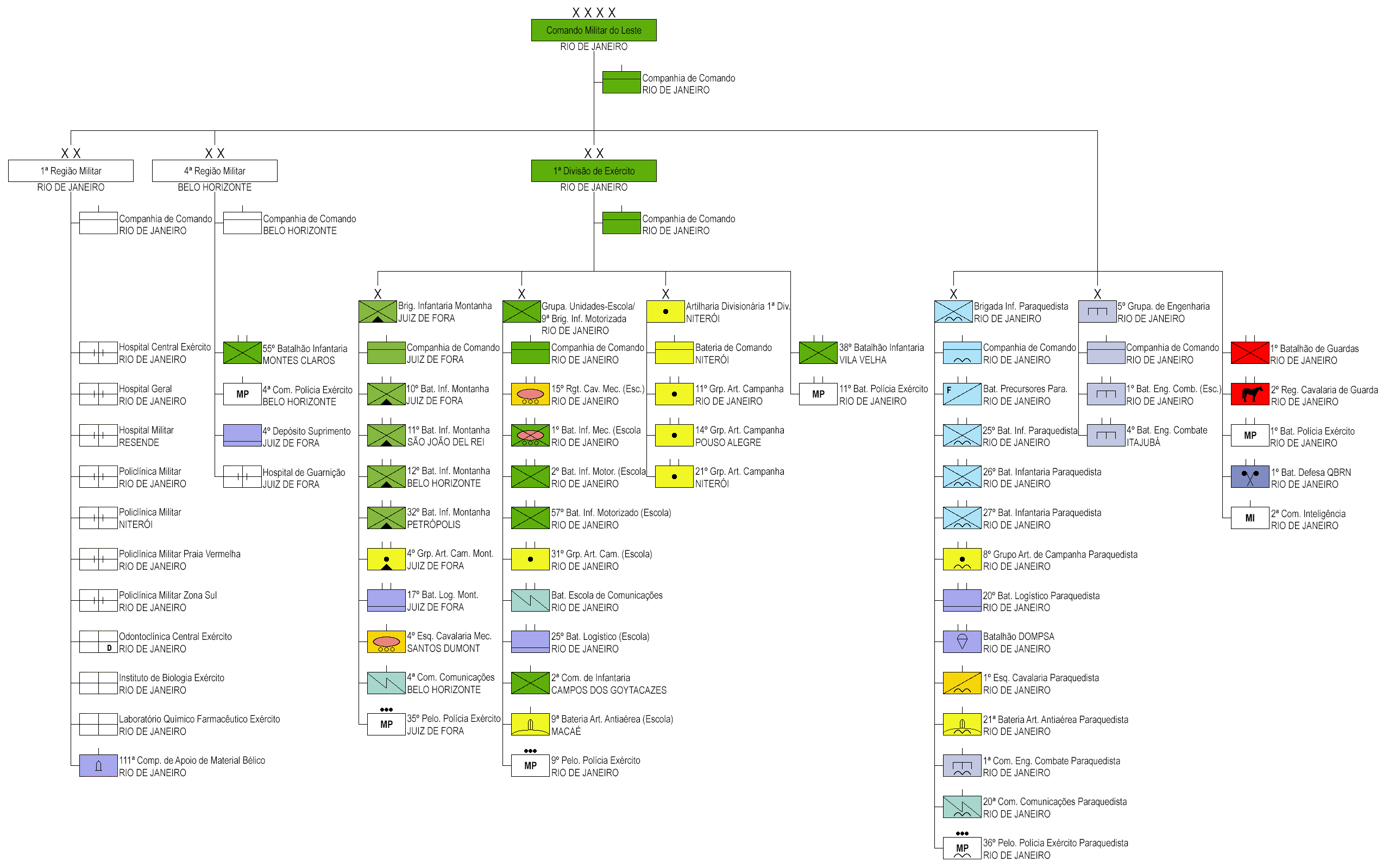
Structure of the Comando Militar do Leste 2017 (click to enlarge)

- Eastern Military Command (Comando do Comando Militar do Leste) in Rio de Janeiro
  - HQ Company Eastern Military Command (Companhia de Comando do Comando Militar do Leste) in Rio de Janeiro
  - 1st Foot Guard Battalion (1º Batalhão de Guardas) in Rio de Janeiro
  - 2nd Guard Cavalry Regiment (2º Regimento de Cavalaria de Guarda) in Rio de Janeiro
  - 1st Military Police Battalion (1º Batalhão de Polícia do Exército) in Rio de Janeiro
  - 2nd Military Intelligence Company (2ª Companhia de Inteligência) in Rio de Janeiro
  - 1st CBRN Defense Battalion (1º Batalhão de Defesa Química, Biológica, Radiológica e Nuclear) in Rio de Janeiro
  - Eastern Training Center (Centro de Adestramento - Leste) in Rio de Janeiro
  - 1st Military Region (1ª Região Militar) in Rio de Janeiro covering the Rio de Janeiro and Espírito Santo states
    - HQ Company 1st Military Region (Companhia de Comando da 1ª Região Militar) in Rio de Janeiro
    - 2nd Infantry Company (2ª Companhia de Infantaria) in Campos dos Goytacazes
    - 111th War Materiel Support Company (111ª Companhia de Apoio de Material Bélico) in Rio de Janeiro
    - Army Central Hospital (Hospital Central do Exército) in Rio de Janeiro
    - Rio de Janeiro Garrison Hospital (Hospital da Guarnição de Rio de Janeiro) in Rio de Janeiro
    - Resende Military Hospital (Hospital Militar de Resende) - in Resende (AMAN)
    - Military Polyclinic of Rio de Janeiro (Policlínica Militar do Rio de Janeiro) in Rio de Janeiro
    - Military Polyclinic of Praia Vermelha (Policlínica Militar da Praia Vermelha) in Rio de Janeiro
    - Military Polyclinic of Niterói (Policlínica Militar do Niterói) in Niterói
    - Central Army Dental Clinic (Odontoclínica Central do Exército) in Rio de Janeiro
    - Army Biology Institute (Instituto de Biologia do Exército) in Rio de Janeiro
    - Army Chemical Pharmaceutical Laboratory (Laboratório Químico Farmacêutico do Exército) in Rio de Janeiro
    - South Zone Military Prefecture (Prefeitura Militar da Zona Sul) in Rio de Janeiro
    - Administrative Base of the Rio de Janeiro Health Complex (Base Administrativa do Complexo de Saúde do Rio de Janeiro) in Rio de Janeiro
    - Administrative Base of the 1st Military Region (Base Administrativa da 1ª Região Militar) in Rio de Janeiro
  - 4th Military Region (4ª Região Militar) in Belo Horizonte covering the Minas Gerais state (without the Triângulo Mineiro area)
    - HQ Company 4th Military Region (Companhia de Comando da 4ª Região Militar) in Belo Horizonte
    - 55th Infantry Battalion (55º Batalhão de Infantaria) in Montes Claros
    - 4th Supply Depot (4° Depósito de Suprimentos) in Juiz de Fora
    - 4th Military Police Company (4ª Companhia de Polícia do Exército) in Belo Horizonte
    - Juiz de Fora Garrison Hospital (Hospital da Guarnição de Juiz de Fora) in Juiz de Fora
  - 5th Engineer Group (5º Grupamento de Engenharia) in Rio de Janeiro
    - HQ Company 5th Engineer Group (Companhia de Comando do 5º Grupamento de Engenharia) in Rio de Janeiro
    - 1st Combat Engineer (Training) Battalion (1º Batalhão de Engenharia de Combate (Escola)) in Rio de Janeiro
    - 4th Combat Engineer Battalion (4º Batalhão de Engenharia de Combate) in Itajubá
    - 10th Construction Engineer Battalion (10º Batalhão de Engenharia de Construção) in Lages
  - Paratrooper Infantry Brigade (Brigada de Infantaria Pára-quedista) in Rio de Janeiro
    - HQ Company Parachute Infantry Brigade (Companhia de Comando da Brigada de Infantaria Pára-quedista) in Rio de Janeiro
    - 25th Parachutist Infantry Battalion (25º Batalhão de Infantaria Pára-quedista) in Rio de Janeiro
    - 26th Parachutist Infantry Battalion (26º Batalhão de Infantaria Pára-quedista) in Rio de Janeiro
    - 27th Parachutist Infantry Battalion (27º Batalhão de Infantaria Pára-quedista) in Rio de Janeiro
    - 8th Parachutist Field Artillery Group (8º Grupo de Artilharia de Campanha Pára-quedista) in Rio de Janeiro
    - 20th Parachutist Logistics Battalion (20º Batalhão Logístico Pára-quedista) in Rio de Janeiro
    - Parachutist Folding, Maintenance and Air Supply Battalion (Batalhão de Dobragem, Manutenção de Pára-quedas e Suprimento Pelo Ar) in Rio de Janeiro
    - Parachutist Pathfinder Batallion (Battalion de Precursores Pára-quedista) in Rio de Janeiro
    - 1st Parachute Cavalry Squadron (1º Esquadrão de Cavalaria Pára-quedista) in Rio de Janeiro
    - 21st Parachutist Air Defence Artillery Battery (21ª Bateria de Artilharia Anti-Aérea Pára-quedista) in Rio de Janeiro
    - 1st Parachutist Combat Engineer Company (1ª Companhia de Engenharia de Combate pára-quedista) in Rio de Janeiro
    - 20th Parachutist Signals Company (20ª Companhia de Comunicações Pára-quedista) in Rio de Janeiro
    - 36th Parachutist Military Police Platoon (36º Pelotão de Polícia do Exército Pára-quedista) in Rio de Janeiro
  - 1st Army Division (1ª Divisão de Exército) in Rio de Janeiro
    - HQ Company 1st Army Division (Companhia de Comando da 1ª Divisão de Exército) in Rio de Janeiro
    - 38th Infantry Battalion (38º Batalhão de Infantaria) in Vila Velha
    - 11th Military Police Battalion (11º Batalhão de Polícia do Exército) in Rio de Janeiro
    - 21st Logistics Battalion (21º Batalhão Logístico) in Rio de Janeiro
    - 1st Division Artillery (Artilharia Divisionária da 1ª Divisão de Exército) in Niterói
      - HQ Battery 1st Division Artillery (Bateria de Comando da Artilharia Divisionária da 1ª DE) in Niterói
      - 11th Field Artillery Group (11º Grupo de Artilharia de Campanha) in Rio de Janeiro
      - 14th Field Artillery Group (14º Grupo de Artilharia de Campanha) in Pouso Alegre
      - 21st Field Artillery Group (21º Grupo de Artilharia de Campanha) in Niterói
    - Mountain Infantry Brigade (Brigada de Infantaria de Montanha) in Juiz de Fora
      - HQ Company Mountain Infantry Brigade (Companhia de Comando da Brigada de Infantaria de Montanha) in Juiz de Fora
      - 10th Mountain Light Infantry Battalion (10º Batalhão de Infantaria Leve de Montanha) in Juiz de Fora
      - 11th Mountain Infantry Battalion (11º Batalhão de Infantaria de Montanha) in São João Del Rei
      - 12th Mountain Light Infantry Battalion (12° Batalhão de Infantaria Leve de Montanha) in Belo Horizonte
      - 32nd Mountain Light Infantry Battalion (32º Batalhão de Infantaria Leve de Montanha) in Petrópolis
      - 4th Mountain Light Field Artillery Group (4º Grupo de Artilharia de Campanha Leve de Montanha) in Juiz de Fora
      - 17th Mountain Light Logistics Battalion (17º Batalhão Logístico Leve de Montanha) in Juiz de Fora
      - 4th Mechanized Cavalry Squadron (4º Esquadrão de Cavalaria Mecanizado) in Santos Dumont
      - 4th Mountain Light Signals Company (4ª Companhia de Comunicações Leve de Montanha) in Belo Horizonte
      - 35th Military Police Platoon (35º Pelotão de Polícia do Exército) in Juiz de Fora
      - Juiz de Fora Training Camp / Center for Environmental Education and Culture (Campo de Instrução de Juiz de Fora / Centro de Educação Ambiental e Cultura) in Juiz de Fora
    - Training Units Group/9th Motorized Infantry Brigade (Grupamento de Unidades-Escola/9ª Brigada de Infantaria Motorizada) in Rio de Janeiro
      - HQ Company Training Units Group/9th Motorized Infantry Brigade (Companhia de Comando do Grupamento de Unidades-escola/9ª Brigada de Infantaria Motorizada) in Rio de Janeiro
      - 15th Mechanized Cavalry (Training) Regiment (15º Regimento de Cavalaria Mecanizado (Escola) ) in Rio de Janeiro
      - 1st Mechanized Infantry (Training) Battalion (1º Batalhão de Infantaria Mecanizado (escola)) in Rio de Janeiro
      - 2nd Motorized Infantry (Training) Battalion (2º Batalhão de Infantaria Motorizado (escola)) in Rio de Janeiro
      - 57th Motorized Infantry (Training) Battalion (57º Batalhão de Infantaria Motorizado (escola)) in Rio de Janeiro
      - 31st Field Artillery (Training) Group (31º Grupo de Artilharia de Campanha (Escola)) in Rio de Janeiro
      - Signals Training Battalion (Batalhão Escola de Comunicações) in Rio de Janeiro
      - 25th Logistics (Training) Battalion (25º Batalhão Logístico (Escola)) in Rio de Janeiro
      - 9th Air Defence Artillery (Training) Battery (9ª Bateria de Artilharia Anti-Aérea (Escola)) in Macaé
      - 9th Military Police Platoon (9º Pelotão de Polícia do Exército) in Rio de Janeiro
