= Operation Farroupilha =

Transfer of government in Rio Grande do Sul, Brazil

Operation Farroupilha was the temporary transfer of the seat of government of the Brazilian state of Rio Grande do Sul from the Piratini Palace in the capital Porto Alegre to a military brigade barracks in Passo Fundo in the northwest of the state. It was planned by Governor Ildo Meneghetti and executed between April 1 and 3, 1964 as part of the coup d'état in Brazil in 1964.

In 1961 Rio Grande do Sul was fundamental in guaranteeing the inauguration of president João Goulart through the Legality Campaign. However, in 1964 the political scenario had changed and Meneghetti's state government was in opposition. The governor participated in the conspiracies that would lead to the coup, and the idea of the Operation had been developed since 1963. However, his intention was to confront the state leftist forces in conjunction with the 3rd Army in Operations "Aliados" or "Combate". Operation Farroupilha was an alternative plan activated on April 1 after legalist general Ladário Pereira Teles took command of the 3rd Army in Porto Alegre and supported the second Legality Campaign initiated by Leonel Brizola. Threats from the 3rd Army, which intended to requisition the Military Brigade, and from anti-coup demonstrators in front of the Piratini Palace, led to Meneghetti's escape from the capital in the afternoon. He was practically deposed, and Porto Alegre remained in the hands of Goulart's supporters. However, the Military Brigade remained loyal to the governor.

Meneghetti took important figures from his administration with him. His options for transferring the capital were Passo Fundo and Santa Maria. Passo Fundo was chosen because of its proximity to the border with Santa Catarina, the alliance with Mayor Mário Menegaz, and the larger numbers of the Military Brigade in contrast to the Army. The governor arrived at night and ordered the preparation of military forces in the city to recapture Porto Alegre. He was allied with General Mario Poppe de Figueiredo and his "Revolutionary 3rd Army", which controlled most of the army units in the interior of Rio Grande do Sul in contest to General Ladario's authority. On April 2, Goulart, the target of the coup, passed through Porto Alegre and refused Ladário and Brizola's offer of a military confrontation. General Ladário agreed to hand over his command and the coup triumphed, making a reconquest unnecessary. The troops of the governor and General Poppe entered Porto Alegre on April 3, and the gaucho government returned to its original capital.

== Context ==
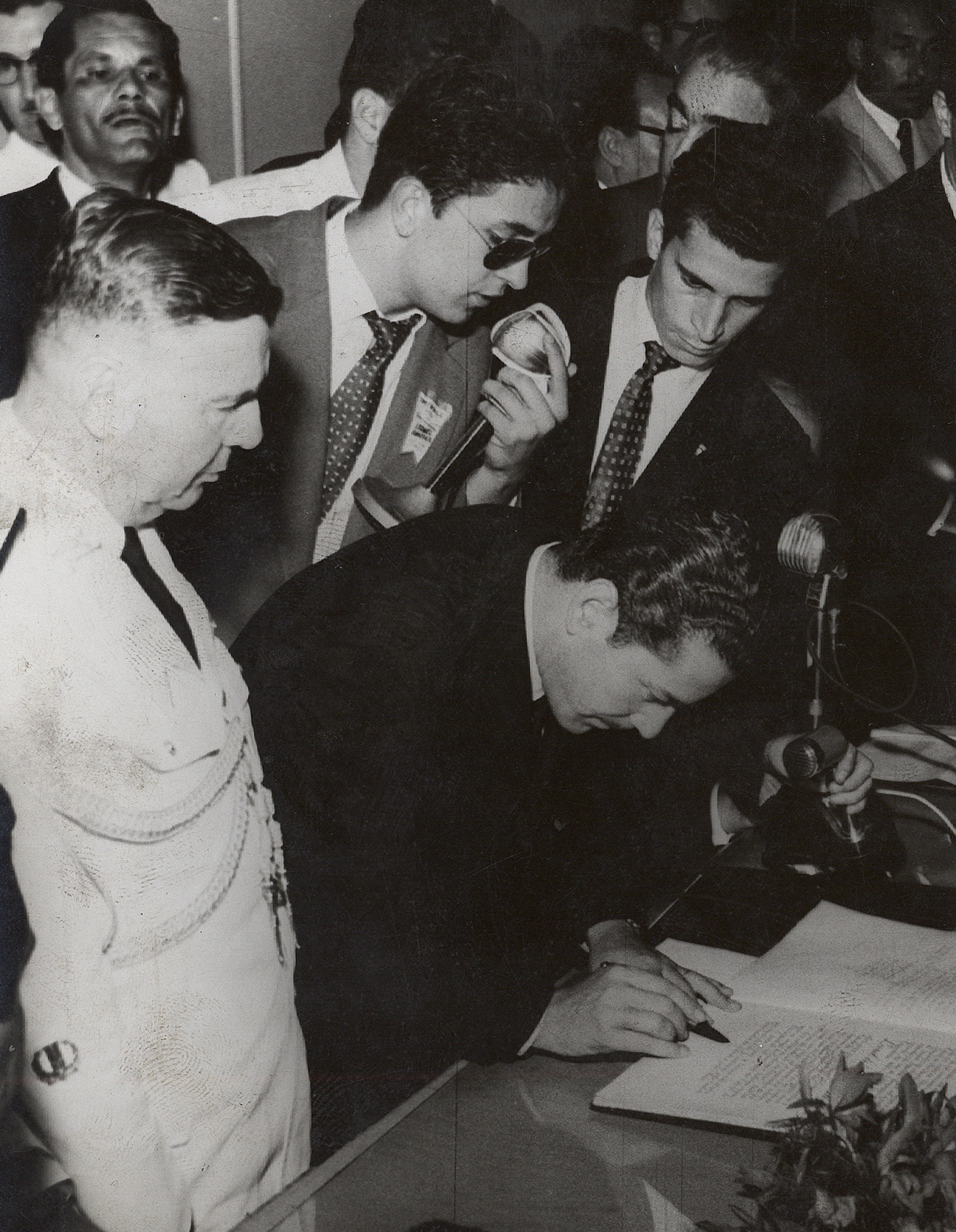
Brizola's inauguration in 1959

Rio Grande do Sul had great importance in the Brazilian political scene during Goulart's government. It was the stage of key events in the Legality Campaign, in 1961, and the 1964 coup d'état, as well as the stronghold of Leonel Brizola, Goulart and their party, the Brazilian Labor Party (Partido Trabalhista Brasileiro - PTB), all targets of the coup. Both Communists and PTB allies had strength, and the PTB was the hegemonic force in state politics during the Fourth Republic. In 1961 Leonel Brizola, as governor, mobilized public opinion, political institutions, and the Military Brigade in the Legality Campaign to gain the inauguration of João Goulart. The 3rd Army, responsible for the Brazilian Army forces in the south of the country, took its side. After 1961, there was in the state, as in the rest of the country, a conservative political effort to influence public opinion and conspiratorial articulations against the president.

Many of Goulart's supporters in 1961 changed sides in 1964, such as the farming and business elites. The state government passed in the 1962 election to Ildo Meneghetti of the Social Democratic Party (Partido Social Democrata - PSD), at the head of an anti-PTB coalition, the Popular Democratic Action (Ação Democrática Popular). This was possible due to the political radicalization, which isolated the PTB, with an additional factor being American funding of the opposition. The new governor played a key role in the conspiracy in Rio Grande do Sul. There were civilian and military conspiracies throughout the country, without central coordination until the eve of the coup. Meneghetti collaborated with other conspiratorial governors.

The Military Brigade was poorly equipped and marked by the indiscipline of its soldiers. Under Meneghetti and the new commander, Colonel Octávio Frota, there was an effort to control the corporation and prevent its alignment in favor of Goulart. The Brigade was subordinated directly to the governor instead of the Secretary of Public Security; Brizolista officers were transferred to administrative positions; and large public graduation ceremonies of officers and enlisted men were held. In the 3rd Army, when the coup arrived in 1964, the conspiracy reached even the headquarters, although the commander, General Benjamim Rodrigues Galhardo, was not part of it. Meneghetti and Adalberto Pereira dos Santos, commander of the 6th Infantry Division (6th DI), pressured Galhardo to join their conspiracy.

== Planning ==
More than a year before the coup, Meneghetti, allied with the commander of the 3rd Infantry Division, General Olímpio Mourão Filho, was already drawing plans for a confrontation with the federal government. The hypothesis was an "attempt by Jango to promote his permanence in power"; since the 3rd Army, headquartered in Porto Alegre, was under the ruling general Jair Dantas Ribeiro, a retreat to the countryside would be necessary. Passo Fundo and Santa Maria, where Mourão commanded the 3rd Infantry Division until February 1963 (later moving on to São Paulo), were important in this plan. The "interiorization policy" of the Meneghetti government, with successive trips of the governor to the interior, thus included preparation for this confrontation.

However, the transfer of the state government to the interior, this is, Operation Farroupilha, was not the ideal future, but an alternative in case of a legalist reaction from the 3rd Army. It was not even the "plan B", but the third option, after two preferable ones. The Correio do Povo, based on information provided by the head of the Civil House Plínio Cabral soon after the coup, defined the plans as:

The first, which was called "Operation Aliados", would consist of a defensive action through a joint action of the government with the Third Army (...) The other, called "Operation Combate", consisted of an action of the Military Brigade, allied with certain Army units, mainly in the interior. The third plan, precisely the one used, called "Operation Farroupilha", foresaw the organization of resistance in a region of the state, with the civilian and military forces regimented.

The possibilities of exile in "Operação Farroupilha" were two: Santa Maria and Passo Fundo. Both were railroad junctions. The former, in the center of the state, and the latter, closer to the northern border, from where it would be possible to defend oneself from enemy forces in Porto Alegre, receive reinforcements or flee. The Military Brigade was reliable, and the Army, an unknown; Passo Fundo had a large presence of the former (2nd Police Battalion) (Note: Called "Hunters", not "Police", until 1961. Currently known as the 3rd Mounted Police Regiment. Axt (2020), p. 318; Zardo (2010), p. 47.) and a small one of the latter (1st Squadron of the 20th Cavalry Regiment). (Note: Santa Maria, on the other hand, had a large concentration of Army personnel. Axt (2020), p. 317.) In local politics in Santa Maria the PTB predominated, and in Passo Fundo, the conservatives.

The PTB had been hegemonic in Passo Fundo until the election of Mayor Mário Menegaz, of the Renewing Labor Movement (Movimento Trabalhista Renovador - MTR), in the 1963 election. The MTR was a split from the PTB. Its representatives in Porto Alegre and in the Legislative Assembly of Rio Grande do Sul were only reconciled with the PTB after the Reforms Rally, opposing the coup. In municipal elections the party had run in alliance with Meneghetti, including in Passo Fundo, where the governor was a major supporter of Menegaz's candidacy. Consequently, although Santa Maria was preferred when Mourão still commanded in the city, Passo Fundo became the preferred destination.

== Setback in Porto Alegre ==
=== Loss of the 3rd Army ===
Caught by surprise on the afternoon of March 31 by news of the coup, the state government strove to ensure its success through "Operation Aliados," however without an open declaration. The governor issued decrees opening extraordinary credit, summoning reserve officers from the Military Brigade, and requisitioning liquid fuel and radio and television stations. However, to his consternation, Goulart named the legalist general Ladário Pereira Teles to replace General Galhardo in the 3rd Army. Galhardo promised to arrest Ladário as soon as he arrived and Meneghetti prepared a manifesto, to be signed by both, adhering to the coup, but the general did not keep his word and Ladário took command in the early morning of April 1.

The new commander of the 3rd Army had orders from the president to give the governor harsh treatment. He requisitioned the fuel and the stations, annulling Meneghetti's previous decrees, and handed the stations over to Leonel Brizola (now only a federal deputy) to make propaganda against the coup, just as in 1961. A second Legality Campaign was born. The predicted condition for Operation Farroupilha - the alignment of the entire 3rd Army with the federal government - would not in fact occur, as Ladário was unable to assert his authority over all the formations. However, the unfolding of the situation was confusing enough to lead the conspirators to the most extreme option.

=== Pressure on the Piratini Palace ===
There are few possibilities for resistance in the city of Porto Alegre, whose brave people are threatened by force, violence, and oppression. Our resistance will not stop. It has just begun.

— Ildo Meneghetti's Manifesto

Brizola, Ladário and General Assis Brasil, head of the Institutional Security Bureau (Gabinete de Segurança Institucional da Presidência da República - GSI), decided to requisition the Military Brigade. The new commander would be Lieutenant-Colonel Daisson Gomes da Silva. The union of the corps with the Army was a way to repeat the Legality Campaign and recover Ladário's authority over the various army garrisons that rebelled in the interior. At 11 am the 3rd Army's command sent an official letter to the Piratini Palace requisitioning the Military Brigade. The governor responded with an ambiguous statement. He considered the requisition unconstitutional. The Constitution defined the Military Police as auxiliary and reserve forces of the Army, but according to the opinion of the State Prosecutor, Mário Mondino, only the President of the Republic could make the requisition. Assis Brasil was supposed to provide a requisition signed by the president, but this did not occur.

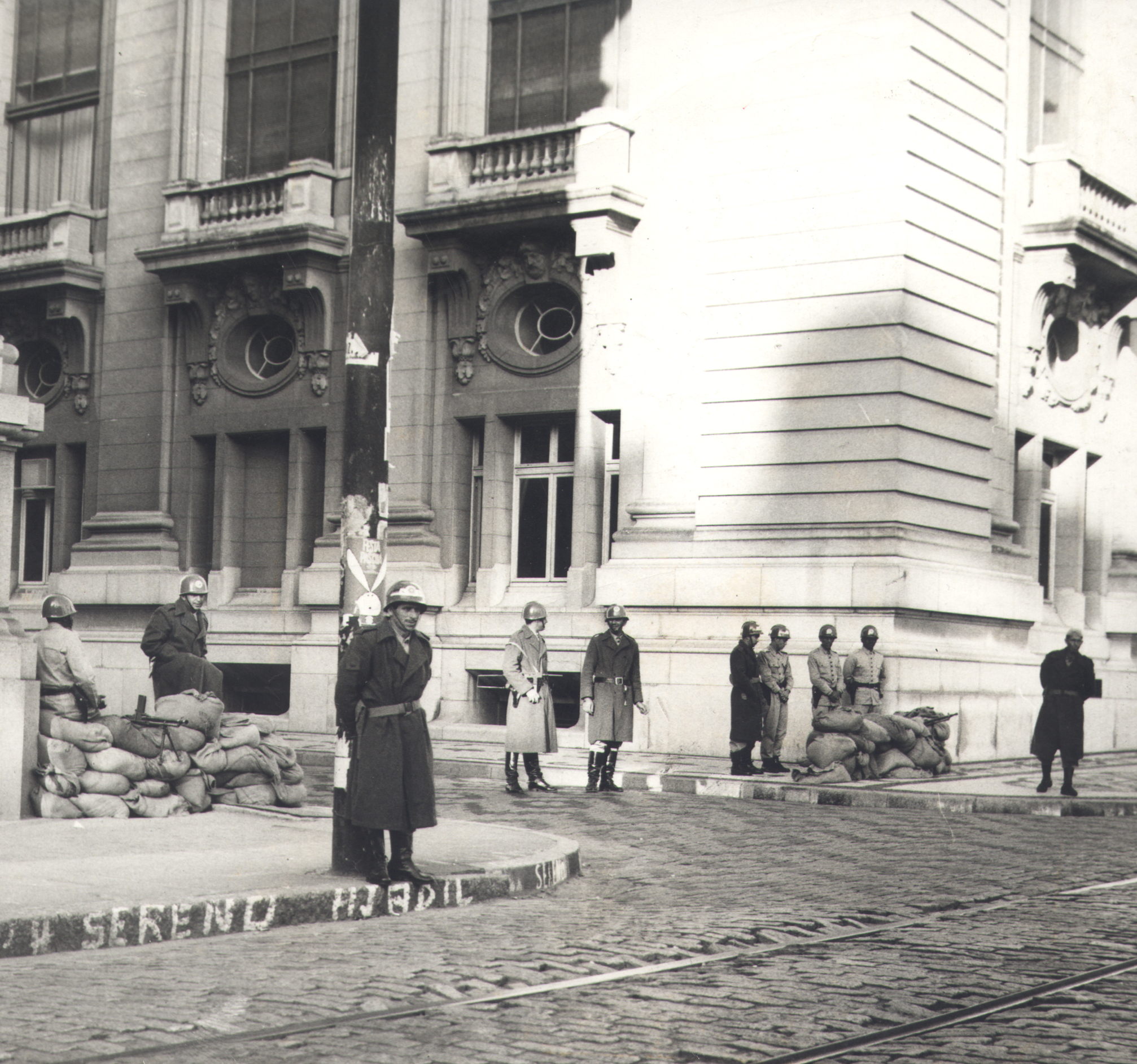
Governor's troops around the Palace.

Ladário issued a proclamation to the military police and sent a new letter with an ultimatum for Meneghetti to hand over the Military Brigade to the 3rd Army by 2pm. In the Piratini Palace, there were fears of federal intervention in the police forces and arrest of the governor if a new ambiguous or negative answer was sent. To make matters worse, also at 11 am a crowd of two thousand protesters against the coup showed up at the Matriz Square. Brigadiers with machine guns and rifles with bayonets mounted guard, but the crowd advanced on the Palace. The atmosphere in the interior was one of panic. The situation only calmed down after Mayor Sereno Chaise redirected the crowd to the Town Hall to attend a speech by Brizola. Meneghetti released a manifesto (Note: It is not known for sure whether before or after his departure. Zardo (2010), p. 50.) and, in the early afternoon, left through the back door of the Piratini Palace and left the capital. He was practically deposed, and Brizola and Ladario controlled Porto Alegre.

As the governor left the capital, the Military Brigade's requisition failed. Colonel Frota was summoned to the 3rd Army's HQ at 5 pm and refused to surrender, demanding a requisition from the governor or President of the Republic; even so, Ladario did not arrest him. 39 legalist officers from the Military Brigade, out of step with the rest of the corps, presented themselves to the 3rd Army, willing to constitute an informal command. There was an unsuccessful attempt to coerce the commander of the Bento Gonçalves regiment, but he remained loyal to the governor. The legalistic attitude had varied motives, such as ideological proximity to Brizola or Goulart and loyalty to the constitutional order.

== Transfer of the capital ==
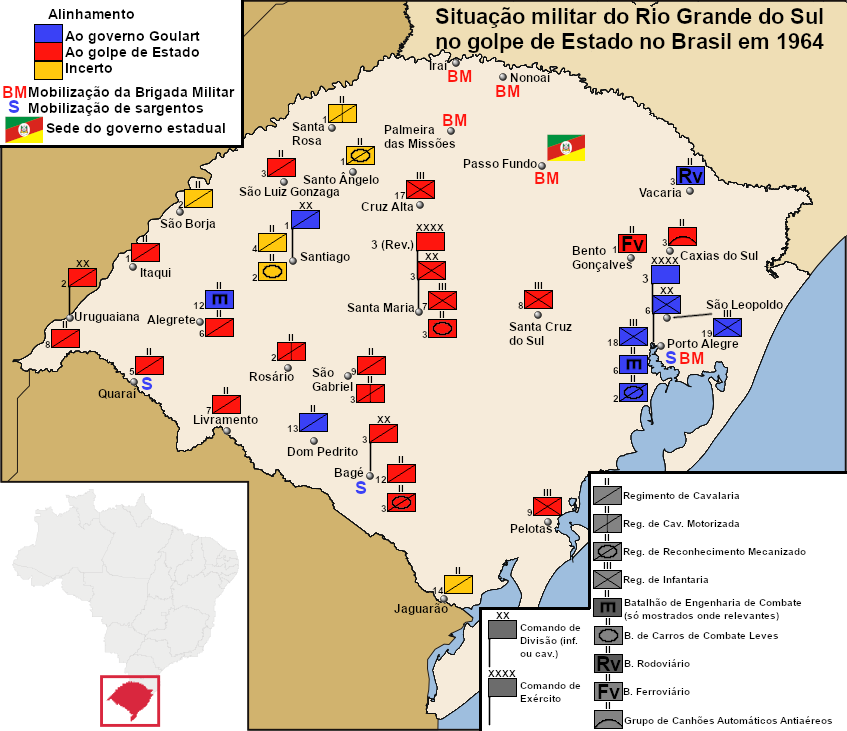
Passo Fundo in the military context of Rio Grande do Sul.

Of the two possible destinations, Passo Fundo was chosen. Besides the alliance with the mayor and the presence of the Military Brigade, the city is close to Cruz Alta, where General Adalberto had taken command after leaving Porto Alegre. Nevertheless, in Santa Maria the situation was also favorable for the coup. General Mário Poppe de Figueiredo, commander of the 3rd Infantry Division, joined around 11:30 am and the next day even offered the city as the new seat of government.

Escorted by Military Brigade Colonel Gonçalino Cúrio de Carvalho, the governor arrived in the city at night, accompanied by the Finance Secretary, José Antônio Aranha, Chief Secretary of the Civil House, Plínio Cabral, Chief Secretary of the Military House, Colonel Orlando Pacheco, and Civil Police Chief Augusto Muniz dos Reis. They were formally received at 8 pm by the mayor and situacionist politicians. Security Secretary Poty Medeiros arrived later. With important members of the administration present, the core of the state government was now operating in an improvised manner in its new headquarters, the barracks of the 2nd Police Battalion.

In the city, now baptized "Capital of Liberty," the governor requisitioned public vehicles and fuel and summoned the reserve officers of the Military Brigade. His forces were swelled by the local Army garrison, volunteers, men from "colonels" in the neighborhoods and military police from the capital and other inland towns. João Magalhães, Secretary of Works, organized the arming. Major Victor Hugo Martins, commander of the 2nd Police Battalion, was promoted to lieutenant-colonel and delegated the command of the entire Military Brigade in the north of Rio Grande do Sul. The objective was the reconquest of Porto Alegre.

Orlando Carlos, president of the Liberator Party, praised Meneghetti for the Operation, for "acting as he did, he preserved the government's authority, assuming a frontal combat position, in the unleashing of possible military operations". With Ladário in command of the 3rd Army, there was the prospect of civil war in Rio Grande do Sul. By April 1 the 3rd Infantry Division and the 2nd and 3rd Cavalry Divisions (DC) had already joined the coup, and on the morning of April 2 Poppe de Figueiredo appointed himself commander of the "Revolutionary 3rd Army", contesting Ladário's authority. (Note: See Motta (2003), p. 69-71 and Bento; Giorgis (2018), p. 123.) The offensive against Porto Alegre, controlled by the few troops still loyal to Ladario, would be carried out in conjunction with the elements of the 3rd Army loyal to Poppe.

== Return to Porto Alegre ==
The expected conflict did not occur. On the morning of April 2, Goulart no longer had a chance of victory and, despite protests from Ladário and Brizola, refused armed resistance. He left for São Borja and, later, to exile in Uruguay. Ladario agreed to hand over his command and on April 3 he went to Rio de Janeiro. Sereno Chaise announced the end of the new Legality Chain, Brizola fled to the interior and the military started the arrests in Porto Alegre. In the afternoon, Meneghetti decided to leave Passo Fundo the next day.

At 8am on April 3 the governor proceeded to Porto Alegre at the head of an armed column of the Military Brigade, the "Freedom Caravan", composed of 12 buses and numerous other vehicles carrying state and municipal authorities and civilian supporters of the coup who had come to Passo Fundo to take up arms. According to Menegaz, "during the whole trip, the caravan received the most significant manifestations of appreciation and solidarity," but a report from an Autonomous Agency of Highways (Departamento Autônomo de Estradas de Rodagem - DAER) driver records the attack on the convoy by people who threw "oranges, stones, bergamots, potatoes. At Pantano Grande the column converged with General Poppe de Figueiredo and his contingent of the 3rd Infantry Division. The convoy arrived in Porto Alegre and the governor entered the palace at 6:15 pm, giving a speech and proclaiming his victory to the press.

The events of 1964 were "the last of the conflicts that involved Rio Grande do Sul, its population and its political leaderships, and also that had its territory as the stage of the events". There was an intense armed mobilization, but that did not result in bloodshed. Without Operation Farroupilha, the governor might have lost his power, and the legalists, managed to control at least in part the Military Brigade. In a 1978 interview, Meneghetti defined his attitude as one of flight, but correct and responsible for the absence of war.

With the beginning of the military dictatorship, there was a purge of leftists and especially Brizolistas in the "Military Brigade, the Universities, the Assembly, the Municipalities, the Chambers, the Judiciary and the Public Ministry." The governor's political gain was not as great as he had hoped, as the Liberator Party and the National Democratic Union (União Democrática Nacional - UDN), "revolutionaries of the first hour," demanded greater power and considered the flight to Passo Fundo as an indication of weakness.

== See also ==
- Legality Campaign
- Reforms Rally
- Southern Military Command
- João Goulart

== Bibliography ==
- Abreu, Luciano Aronne de (2013). Uma segunda legalidade por Jango: Porto Alegre, 1º de abril de 1964. (in Portuguese) Porto Alegre: Oficina do Historiador.
- Axt, Gunter (agosto de 2020). Resistência e derrota do Presidente João Goulart, em abril de 1964, em Porto Alegre (in Portuguese) Rio de Janeiro: IHGB. Revista IHGB
- Bento, Cláudio Moreira; Giorgis, Luiz Ernani Caminha (2018). História do Comando Militar do Sul: 1953-2018 e Antecedentes (in Portuguese). Porto Alegre/Resende: FAHIMTB.
- Faria, Fabiano Godinho (2013). João Goulart e os militares na crise dos anos de 1960 (PhD). Rio de Janeiro: UFRJ.
- Ferreira, Jorge (2011). João Goulart: uma biografia (in Portuguese) Rio de Janeiro: Civilização Brasileira
- Konrad, Diorge Alceno; Lameira, Rafael Fantinel; Lima, Mateus da Fonseca Capssa (2013). O golpe e a consolidação da ditadura civil-militar no Rio Grande do Sul. (in Portuguese) Cuadernos del CILHA.
- Lameira, Rafael Fantinel (2012). O Golpe civil-militar de 1964 no Rio Grande do Sul: a ação política liberal-conservadora (Thesis; in Portuguese). Porto Alegre: UFRGS.
- Motta, Aricildes de Morais (2003). 1964-31 de março: O movimento revolucionário e sua história (in Portuguese) História Oral do Exército, Tomo 13. Rio de Janeiro: Biblioteca do Exército Editora
- Silva, Hélio (2014). 1964: Golpe ou Contragolpe? (in Portuguese) Porto Alegre: L&PM
- Silva, Kelvin Emmanuel Pereira da (2016). A oposição de oficiais da Brigada Militar do Rio Grande o Sul ao golpe de Estado de 1964 (Bachelor; in Portuguese). UFRGS.
- Zardo, Murilo Erpen (2010). Operação farroupilha: a transferência do governo estadual do Rio Grande do Sul para Passo Fundo durante os dias do golpe civil-militar de 1964 (Bachelor; in Portuguese). Porto Alegre: UFRGS.
