= Revolutionary 3rd Army =

Unified command of the Brazilian Army that joined the 1964 coup d'état

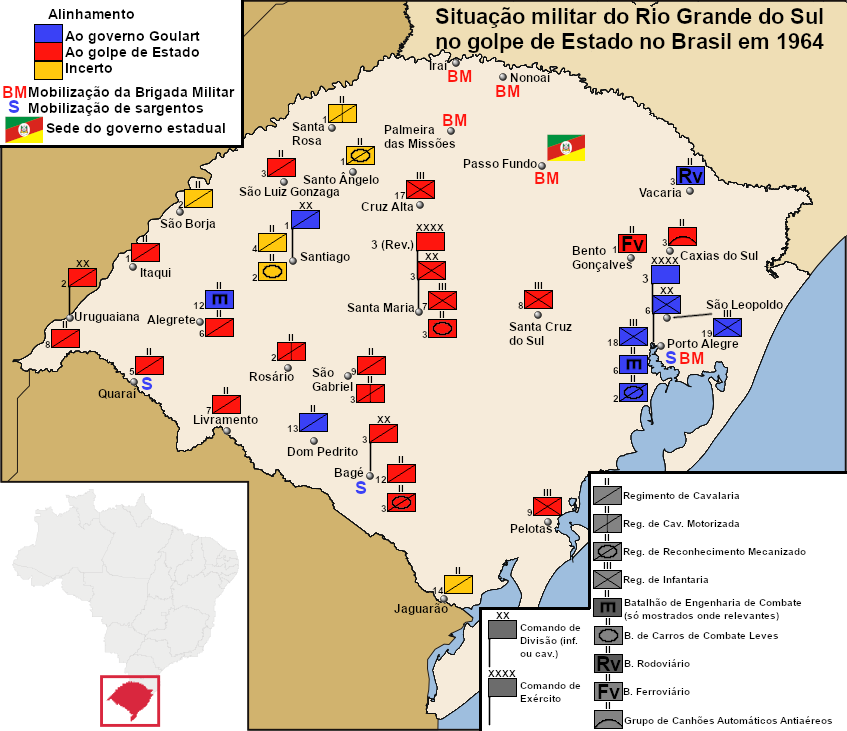
Alignment of the Rio Grande do Sul garrisons during the coup

The Revolutionary 3rd Army was the unified command of the Brazilian Army forces that joined the 1964 Brazilian coup d'état in the South region of the country. It emerged on April 2 by the self-proclamation of General Mário Poppe de Figueiredo, in charge of the 3rd Infantry Division in Santa Maria, as commander of the 3rd Army. Revolution was the self-designation of the coup d'état. The 3rd Army was based in Porto Alegre and commanded by General Ladário Pereira Teles, loyal to the João Goulart government and opposed to the coup. With Goulart's departure from Porto Alegre and the triumph of the coup over his government, on April 3 Ladário gave up his command and Poppe de Figueiredo took over the 3rd Army in Porto Alegre, ending the duality of command.

In 1961 the Third Army guaranteed Goulart's inauguration as president by participating in the Legality Campaign. In 1964 the president again relied on the 3rd Army, getting Ladario in command on April 1 and landing in Porto Alegre the next day. However, most of the southern garrisons were against him, reversing the 1961 situation. Opposition military officers, especially of the middle rank, had plotted against the president and managed during the coup to gain the support of their comrades, even those until then loyal to the government. The governors of Rio Grande do Sul, Ildo Meneghetti, and Paraná, Ney Braga, participated in the coup. Pressure from the governors in Porto Alegre forced Meneghetti to transfer his capital through Operation Farroupilha. Meanwhile, there was mobilization among the lower ranks in favor of Goulart. The prospect of a fight arose between the majority of units loyal to Poppe de Figueiredo and the minority loyal to Ladário, but Goulart did not accept the fight and left Porto Alegre.

There were six divisions, the 5th Military Region/Infantry Division (5th RM/DI) in Paraná and Santa Catarina, and the others in Rio Grande do Sul. In the 5th RM/DI the legalist commander, General Silvino Castor da Nóbrega, was prevented from disembarking, and General Dário Coelho took his place. The unit joined the coup and was provisionally incorporated into the 2nd Army, in São Paulo. In the 3rd DI and the 2nd and 3rd COs, there was adhesion with important pressure from the officers on their commanders - Poppe de Figueiredo, Joaquim de Mello Camarinha, and Hugo Garrastazu. In the 1st DC and 6th DI the situation was complex. The commander of the 1st DC, João de Deus Nunes Saraiva, remained legalistic but went to Porto Alegre, while parts of his division joined the coup. The commander of the 6th DI, Adalberto Pereira dos Santos, was a conspirator but had to leave his headquarters in Porto Alegre and command from one of his regiments in Cruz Alta, while at headquarters the command was assumed by Colonel Jarbas Ferreira de Souza and the units were in theory legalists. In all divisions there was dissension between officers in favor of and against the coup. Among the smaller units not subordinated to the divisions, the notorious legalist position was that of the 3rd Road Battalion, in Vacaria.

== Context ==
In the 1960s the Brazilian Army had its forces concentrated in Rio de Janeiro and in the South, that is, the 1st and 3rd Armies. The 3rd Army had two Military Regions (3rd and 5th), three Infantry Divisions (3rd, 5th and 6th) and three Cavalry Divisions (1st, 2nd and 3rd). With the exception of the 5th RM and DI, in Paraná and Santa Catarina, all were in Rio Grande do Sul. The Military Regions had administrative and territorial functions, and the 5th had a merged command with that of the 5th DI. The territory of the 5th RM/DI housed a much smaller land force than that present in Rio Grande do Sul. The Infantry Divisions had around 5,500 priavates each, organized into three infantry regiments. The Cavalry Divisions, with similar numbers, had (in Rio Grande do Sul) four cavalry regiments, one motorized cavalry regiment, and one mechanized reconnaissance regiment. (Note: This was an inconsistent mix of horse, motorized, and mechanized forces Pedrosa (2018, p. 108). In practice the hypomobile forces used improvised motorization on campaign rather than the horse. See Savian (2014, pp. 176–180), and the mentioned motorization in Lopes (1980, p. 64))

In 1961 the 3rd Army ensured João Goulart's inauguration as president when its commander, General José Machado Lopes, participated with his forces in the Legality Campaign in alliance with the governor of Rio Grande do Sul Leonel Brizola. Machado Lopes left command in October 1961. The 3rd Army was again a factor in Goulart's favor in anticipating the referendum on parliamentarism in September 1962. Its commander at the time, General Jair Dantas Ribeiro, was the Minister of War in 1964. The command of the 3rd Army had been with General Benjamim Rodrigues Galhardo since August 1963.

The importance of the 3rd Army in 1961 and the fact that Rio Grande do Sul was Goulart's home state made it a natural refuge for the president's reaction to a new coup d'état. Thus, the region was a priority for the allocation of reliable officers from the government's military establishment. In 1964, the governors appeared to predominate in the south. However, in the coup d'état that year, the 3rd Army behaved contrary to its behavior in 1961, participating in the deposition of Goulart. The governors controlled the headquarters and announced they had control over all of Rio Grande do Sul, but this did not correspond to reality, with units in the interior joining the coup. The government's control over Porto Alegre was the exception.

The change reflected the nationwide trend in the Army and had as antecedents the conspiratorial activity against Goulart conducted by the Institute of Research and Social Studies (IPES) and, in parallel, by General Olímpio Mourão Filho. Mourão commanded the 3rd DI from 1961 to 1963, and articulated with the 6th DI and the 2nd and 3rd DCs. But in the conspiracy the middle ranking officers predominated under the leadership of some colonels. The conspiracy reached the commander of the 6th DI, Adalberto Pereira dos Santos, the governor elected in 1962, Ildo Meneghetti, and even General Galhardo's HQ, although he was not part of it. Both the government and the conspirators had no confidence in Galhardo. At the time of the coup, even the interior units had commanders trusted by the government, but many, realizing the government's defeat, changed positions at the last minute to save their careers. The pressure from the general staffs on the commanders was important in joining the coup. An additional factor was the absence of several trusted officers because they were on vacation.

One of the effects of the Legality Campaign was the strengthening of the lower ranks movement. The sergeants acted in defense of Goulart's inauguration, standing out, in the case of the Army, the movement in the 18th Infantry Regiment in 1961. In 1964, the sergeants in Rio Grande do Sul were again relevant in favor of Goulart. Brizola gave a speech calling on the sergeants to occupy the barracks, but the actions were isolated. In the Army as a whole, the sergeants' loyalty to the chain of command was greater than in the Air Force and Navy.

== Command in Porto Alegre ==
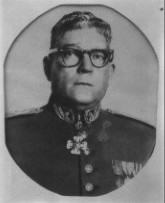
Ladário Pereira Teles.

On March 31, news arrived of the beginning of the coup in Minas Gerais. At 4:30 pm, General Galhardo put the 3rd Army on standby, and at 8:30 pm he informed General Adalberto of the arrival of General Ladário Pereira Teles. According to the government's plan, Galhardo would follow to the command of the Brazilian Army General Staff, in Rio de Janeiro, and Ladário to the 6th DI. As the oldest general in the 3rd Army, he would occupy its command on an interim basis after Galhardo's departure. Galhardo wanted to arrest Ladário as soon as he arrived in Porto Alegre, but failed due to lack of support from his officers. At 02:50 on April 1, he handed over command.

Ladário's inauguration went against expectations of an easy victory for the coup in Rio Grande do Sul. He supported the attempt by Leonel Brizola (now only a deputy) and Mayor Sereno Chaise, whose supporters occupied the city, to repeat the Legality Campaign. Under pressure, the state government was transferred to Passo Fundo through Operation Farroupilha. Despite the setback, he managed to maintain control of the Military Brigade, defeating the attempted requisition by the 3rd Army.

Ladário received the support of the Air Force (5th Airborne Zone) and the enmity of the Navy (5th Naval Zone). Within the 3rd Army, the General Staff was not trusted, although its chief, General Otomar Soares de Lima, was an enemy of the coup plotters. According to Colonel José Codeceira Lopes, the pro-coup elements in the General Staff had contacts in the headquarters of the 3rd RM and the 6th DI, and in the 6th Army Police Company and the 1st Guard Company; however, they knew that a reaction by force was impossible, since the troops were loyal to the government. The 3rd RM was commanded by General Floriano da Lima Machado, trusted by the military establishment. In Porto Alegre the unit commanders and sergeants of the Army, Military Police and, at least in part, the Air Force were governors.

== Situation in the divisions ==
=== 5th Infantry Division ===
==== Situation in Paraná ====
The 5th RM/DI was politically divided, with supporters and opponents of the federal government. At a meeting on March 29 the consensus of the colonels in Curitiba was to "ensure discipline under all circumstances, maintain the hierarchy, and fight communism". The governors were more numerous among the sergeants. At the time of the coup the region was commanded by General Silvino Castor da Nóbrega, who "if not openly preaching, in a veiled manner defended the President's positions". Some of Silvino's subordinates considered him too close to the left, but others admired him as professional, disciplined and legalistic. The commander of the Divisionary Infantry (ID/5), Chrysantho de Miranda Figueiredo, openly defended the reforms proposed by the president.

Silvino and Chrysantho were on vacation in Rio de Janeiro. General Dario Coelho of the Divisionary Artillery (AD/5) was in interim command of the region. Colonels Rubens Barra and Reynaldo de Mello Almeida were responsible for ID/5 and AD/5. This was a disadvantage for the government: Dário sympathized with the conspirators. General Carlos Luís Guedes, an important conspirator in Minas Gerais, was on March 30 optimistic to learn of Dário's presence in command in Curitiba. Guedes and Magalhães Pinto, the Minas Gerais governor, were in contact with Ney Braga, governor of Paraná and a participant in the conspiracy; however, he also included some leftists within his government and came to have indecision that was worrisome to the conspirators. When he finally took a position in favor of the coup, he was of decisive importance. Many Paraná citizens shared this support, and the governors mounted practically no resistance.

Although some military men were aware of the impending rebellion, they did not know its date, and the coup was a surprise. General Dario's joining the conspiracy only occurred the day before, when the governor handed him a letter from Guedes. News of the leadership of Magalhães Pinto and the governors Adhemar de Barros of São Paulo and Carlos Lacerda of Guanabara created fear, as the officers did not like these politicians.

==== Break with the commander ====
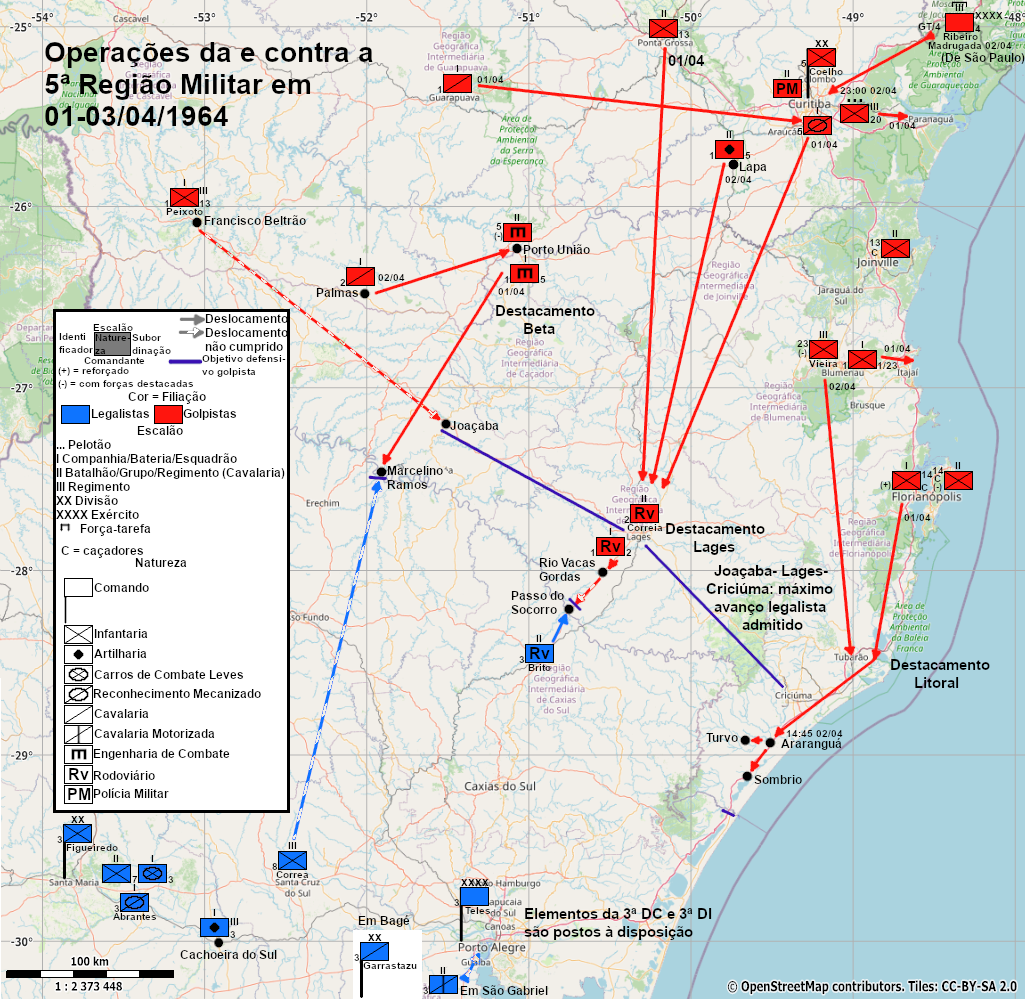
5th RM/DI Operations.

On March 31, the officers in Curitiba arranged with General Silvino to send an emissary to Rio to exchange information. The one designated at 14:00 was Colonel Reynaldo, well connected to the General, with an additional mission - to bring Silvino to the coup side or convince him not to return. For Chrysantho, of a better-known position, it would not be necessary. With the flight delay, Reynaldo did not arrive until 22:00. It was already late: at 9:00 pm the RM was informed that Silvino and Chrysantho, accompanied by Ladário, would be on board in half an hour to assume their commands. The plane took off at 9:55 pm, heading to Porto Alegre with a stop in the capital of Paraná. When it flew over Curitiba at 11:45 pm, it could not land, according to Ladário's account, because of fog.

Contrary to the prevailing version, if there was no visibility, it was human, not meteorological, fault. General Dario conspired with the governor and the commander of the Curitiba Air Base to prevent the arrival. The runway was kept dark. The pilot could have landed at Bacacheri Airport, whose commander had not blocked the runway, but for no known reason he did not and proceeded to Porto Alegre. Had they landed in Curitiba, the generals would have been met by Dario - and officers willing to arrest them.

On the 1st, at 02:00 in the morning Amaury Kruel, commander of the 2nd Army, in São Paulo, communicated to the 5th RM/DI its adhesion to the coup. Dário declared his solidarity and after 06:50 the regional command joined the rebellion of São Paulo and Minas Gerais, thus breaking with the 3rd Army; later, the rupture was deepened with the provisional subordination of the region to the 2nd Army. Silvino still tried to give orders from Porto Alegre, but they were not obeyed. He was offered to reassume his command as long as he joined the coup, but when he refused, he was warned not to follow to Curitiba. Three detachments (Beta, Lages, and Litoral) were organized to march towards Rio Grande do Sul, reinforced on the 2nd by Tactical Grouping 4, coming from São Paulo. Most officers agreed to join the coup, and some dissidents, such as two lieutenant colonels in administrative positions, were arrested.

=== 3rd Infantry Division ===
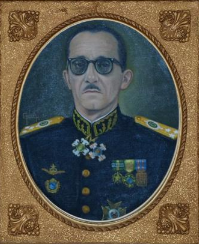
Poppe de Figueiredo.

In Santa Maria, the 3rd DI joined the coup at around 11:30 on April 1. Like many other generals, Commander Poppe de Figueiredo joined only when the breakdown of the ruling military apparatus was visible; he was considered to be trusted, and joining only occurred under pressure. According to Ruy de Paula Couto, then colonel in charge of the 3rd Regiment of 105 mm Obuses (3rd RO 105) and the Divisionary Artillery, Poppe was not against the movement, but was inhibited by his feeling of gratitude to the Minister of War. Both Couto and Colonel Ramão Menna Barreto, chief of staff of the division, (Note: Menna Barreto had held this position since Mourão Filho's command and was his first conspiratorial contact. Pinto (2015, p. 80).) describe the general as undecided, while Poppe does not mention doubt in his memoirs. His adhesion came after that of the 2nd and 3rd COs, whose commanders appealed to him to change sides; he himself also cites the influence of General Adalberto, from the 6th DI. The decision was made in a meeting with the officers, and Colonels Menna Barreto and Couto also pressured their commander. In his memoirs, Poppe privileges the phone call from the 3rd DC as the reason for joining. Menna Barreto "had the troop in his hands and had already positioned himself openly"; in his account, he states that Poppe would be arrested by his colonels if he did not join.

The three infantry regiments (7th, from Santa Maria, 8th, from Santa Cruz do Sul, and 9th, from Pelotas) had commanders who were not aligned to the coup. In all three, the action of subordinates impeded the reaction to the coup. The official report attributes this to several officers of the 7th General Staff and to the subcommanders of the 8th and 9th. There were preparations to arrest and replace Lieutenant Colonel Alberto Firmo de Almeida, of the 7th RI, if he acted against the coup. (Note: The account of the sub-commander of the 9th RI is in Motta (2003, pp. 111–115, Vol. 13).)

In the Divisionary Artillery, General Newton Barra was commander but was on vacation in Rio. According to Menna Barreto, "we knew that the Commander of the AD would not join the Revolution, so we assigned a group to arrest him, because the business was for real". The general went to Porto Alegre, but from there he informed that he would not return to Santa Maria until the return to normality, because he did not want to join. In the 3rd RO 105, even before Poppe's accession the officers already wanted the commander to take a position, but he insisted on waiting; an individual accession, before the rest of the division, could lead to a reaction from Poppe to maintain his prestige and even to combat. After the decision of the division command, the regiment joined immediately.

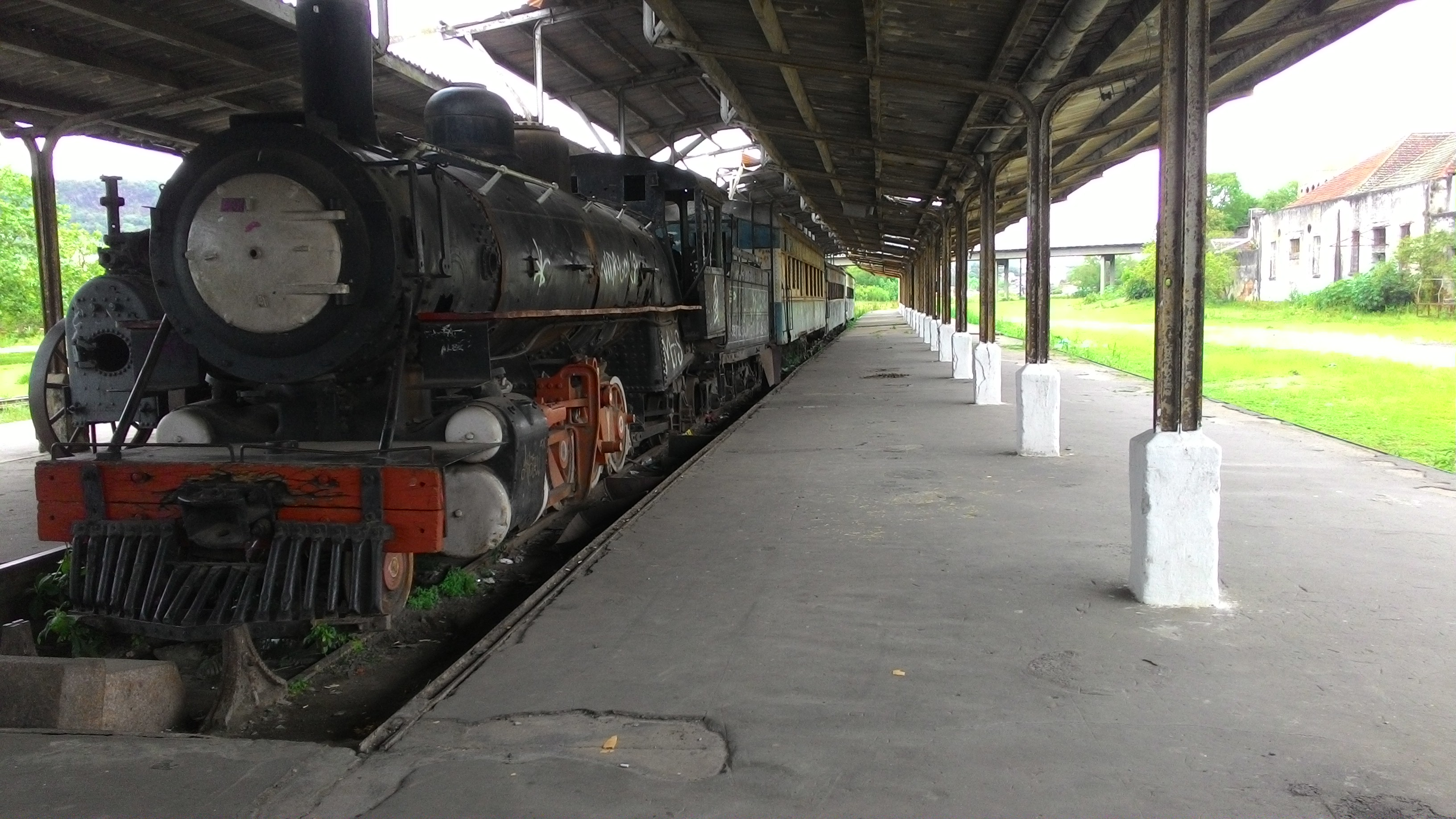
Gare Station in Santa Maria: the city was a strategic railroad nexus.

Thus, the official report considers the problems in the division's units to be minimal. Besides difficulties with commanders, in the 3rd Light Combat Car Battalion (BCCL) "there was much uneasiness in the first days," and in the 7th RI, the arrest of a lieutenant and transfer of six sergeants. In the 3rd Mechanized Reconnaissance Squadron some officers and most of the sergeants at first did not accept the division commander's decision.

The Military Brigade had two units in Santa Maria, the 1st Rural Mounted Police Regiment and 2nd Guards Battalion. The commander of the mounted regiment was also responsible for garrisoning the entire city and fully accepted Poppe's decision, while the battalion commander was reluctant and came under pressure. (Note: The name of the units present in Santa Maria in 1961 can be seen in page 571 of Ribeiro (1987) The "Santa Maria garrison" mentioned in the 3rd DI report is described on p. 548)

At the state level, the accession of the 3rd DI subtracted from the legalists substantial numbers and an important railroad junction, whose railroad maintenance workshops had thousands of employees. At the municipal level, it strengthened the conservative camp in the city, with a large military and religious presence, against the camp of unionists (especially railroad workers) and student militants. Since his inauguration in 1963, Poppe de Figueiredo monitored the Gauchos Railroad Workers Union (UFG), nicknamed "Soviete," and its leader Balthazar Mello. He considered it subversive and condemned its "discretionary power" over the category and the damage caused by the stoppages. The railroad leaders started a strike, but were arrested.

=== 6th Infantry Division ===
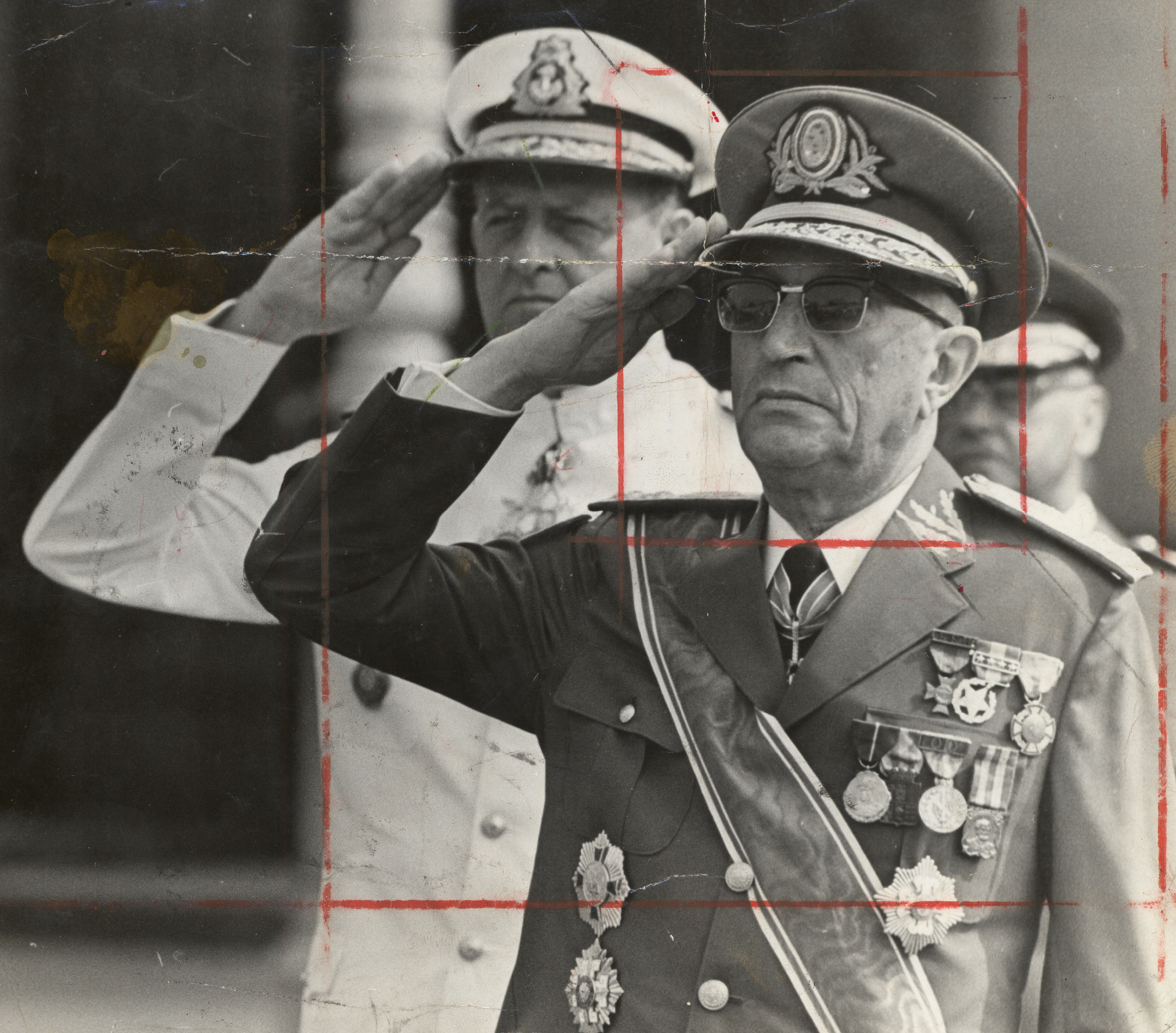
Adalberto Pereira dos Santos.

With Ladário's appointment to the 6th DI and his inauguration in the 3rd Army, General Adalberto was to hand over his command and travel to Rio de Janeiro. At 03:30 of day 1 he telephoned Santa Maria communicating his intention not to hand over his command and urging General Poppe to join the coup; according to the official report of the 3rd DI, his answer was "the heart tells me to support you, but reason doesn't allow me to do so". At 05:00 he agreed to hand over his command, but then he went to Cruz Alta, clandestinely took command of the local garrison, and joined the coup. In Porto Alegre, the division's command was taken over by Colonel Jarbas Ferreira de Souza, commander of the 6th Engineering Battalion and considered a Communist Party sympathizer. (Note: Axt (2020) places this event on April 2, unlike the other sources. Faria (2013) incorrectly gives Passo Fundo as the destination.) According to Major Décio Barbosa Machado, AD/6's assistant commander, he arrived in the city by surprise at dawn. For Lieutenant Colonel Agostini, of the 3rd DI, Adalberto could do nothing from Cruz Alta, because the rest of the division was aligned with the Minister of War. On the other hand, for Major Renato Moreira, of the 3rd Army's General Staff, Colonel Jarbas faced a lot of resistance from his subordinates, and most were pro-Adalberto.

The three infantry regiments were the 17th in Cruz Alta, the 18th in Porto Alegre, and the 19th in São Leopoldo. The Cruz Alta garrison was trusted by Adalberto, and he found support from the commanders of the 17th RI, AD/6, and 2nd/6th RA 75 AR; however, rumors circulated of a sergeants' conspiracy against him. The 18th and 19th RIs, on the other hand, were evaluated as loyal in a survey done by the 3rd Army, with reservations. Major Moreira cites the 18th RI as one of the units that did not accept Colonel Jarbas' authority.

According to Captain Luiz Gonzaga Schroeder Lessa, company commander of the 19th RI, the regiment offered refuge to General Adalberto, but after he left Porto Alegre, his whereabouts were unknown. According to Major Machado, Adalberto went to Cruz Alta without passing through São Leopoldo, because he did not trust the garrison. In the regiment, at 15:00 Ladario swore in Lieutenant-Colonel Osvaldo Nunes in command. There are reports of the situation by Captain Lessa and aspirant Flávio Oscar Maurer. There had long been a division between the two battalions, the 1st tending to the right, and the 2nd to the left. The 1st Company of the 1st Battalion, led by Captain Attila Rohrsetzer, moved in advance to the Morro do Espelho (Mirror Hill), behind the barracks, and remained there without participating in the crisis. The regimental commander, Lieutenant-Colonel Otávio Moreira Borba, "anti-Brizolista, but without much appetite for the job", was summoned to Porto Alegre. Some officers tried to demote him from leaving, because he would be arrested and Osvaldo Nunes, who was subcommander, would take his place. They wanted at least time for Lieutenant-Colonel Nei de Moraes Fernandes, who was on leave, to take over. However, they were ignored.

The new commander opened the barracks to an entourage of unionists, "city councilmen, teachers, reserve military and ordinary citizens." They wanted the regiment to take over Radio São Leopoldo for the "Brizolista cause". A team of officers did not approve and, armed, went to the hall where they were, expelling them in "violent beatings". Several officers, including a company commander, were arrested. Nunes' authority was empty and he could no longer make any shift in favor of the government. The regiment was bewildered: no orders came from Adalberto and no orders from the Divisionary Infantry or the area commander. A group led by Sergeant Bernardino Saraiva (Note: See his entry in the Dossiê dos mortos e desaparecidos políticos a partir de 1964 (1996).) remained rulers and entrenched in a corner of the barracks until they were advised of the overthrow of the government and disappearance of the president.

=== 1st Cavalry Division ===
In Santiago, General João de Deus Nunes Saraiva of the 1st DC, whose promotion had been favored by Goulart, remained loyal. After the 3rd DI joined, it sent a group of emissaries to Saraiva, but he refused to join because of his friendship and gratitude to the president and did not allow the visitors to try to convince his subordinates. According to one of the emissaries, Colonel Menna Barreto, Saraiva's response was, "I am anti-communist indeed, but first of all I am a very good friend of Ladário". Another officer also defines Saraiva's motivation as personal, the "old squares" relationship with Jango and the Minister of War.

According to a staff officer of the 2nd AD, the area of the 1st AD was considered enemy territory; however, Saraiva's response to General Ladario's call, traveling to Porto Alegre in the afternoon of the 1st, is criticized as having left the division in a state of lethargy, allowing some of his subordinates to contact the 2nd AD. According to Odílio Denys, the division joined while its commander was in Porto Alegre. After April 2, when he wanted to return from Porto Alegre, he learned that he would be arrested if he landed in Santiago. His own subordinates prevented him from reassuming command. In his absence, command was, depending on the account, assumed by Colonel João Augusto Montarroyos, Chief of Staff, or Colonel Raul Rego Monteiro Porto, commander of the 1st RCM, Santa Rosa, as Montarroyos had been promoted to general on March 25 and was out of the garrison.

Of his four cavalry regiments (1st, from Itaqui, 2nd, from São Borja, 3rd, from São Luiz Gonzaga, and 4th, from Santiago), the 1st subordinated itself to the command of the 2nd DC and the 3rd also rejected Saraiva's authority. The 2nd, according to Hélio Lourenço Ceratti, sent there by the Army Command and General Staff School, remained legalistic even 40 days after the coup; Serafim Vargas, Getúlio's brother, was influential in the regiment, the commander of the garrison and of the 2nd 75 Horse Artillery Group, Colonel Hélio Nunes, believed in Goulart's return to the presidency, and only the city's Marine Corps had joined the coup. Ceratti even reports that the Marine barracks were shot at. In Porto Alegre Goulart asked General Saraiva about the regiment, and he assured him that the unit was loyal. However, when Goulart was in the city on April 3 he was intimidated by rumors that the 2nd RC had orders to arrest him. For Major Moreira, despite the Vargas influence in the 2nd RC, they did not obstruct the coup. As for the 4th RC, he describes its commander, Colonel Álvaro Lúcio de Arêas, as opposed to the speech of the ruling general Oromar Osório (Saraiva's predecessor), but obedient.

In addition to intervening in Radio Itaqui, the 1st RC took the prisoners made in the city to what became known as the "iternment" in the hangar of the aviation club. The prisoners suffered, but there was no physical torture or forced labor.

=== 2nd Cavalry Division ===
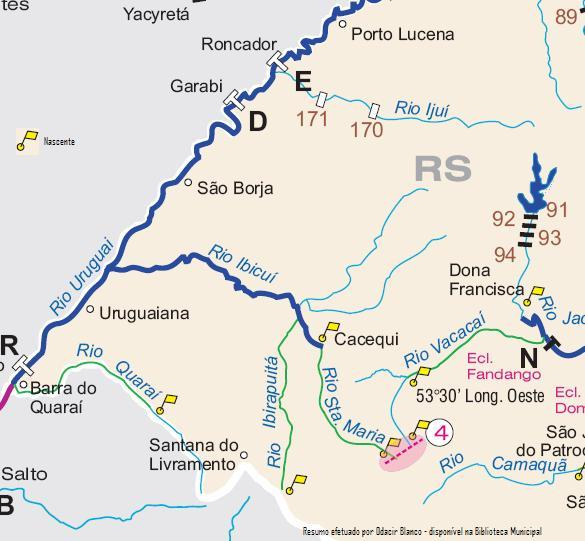
2nd DC Region.

In Uruguaiana, General Joaquim de Mello Camarinha, of the 2nd DC, was trusted by the Minister of War. He joined under pressure from his subordinates. According to his reports, since the night of March 31 he was urged to decide. He resisted: "You are just kids; I was promoted to general by Jango". Then he heard: "You can't wait for the picture to be defined before making your decision". "Your loyalty to Jango and your loyalty to Brazil" were countered. With the insistence of the sub-commander of the 8th RC, he joined at the beginning of the 1st. It would have been easy to arrest him, but it was important to maintain cohesion and hierarchy, avoiding the rupture that occurred in the garrison in 1961. After joining, his attitude was that "I am with my friends against my enemies, but you can count on me". As he had already been exiled for his participation in the losing side of the Constitutionalist Revolution, he did not want to be on the losing side again and strove to win.

The cavalry regiments were the 5th, from Quaraí, the 6th, from Alegrete, the 7th, from Livramento, and the 8th, from Uruguaiana. Two colonels in the division were trusted by the Minister of War: Geraldo Knaack, from the 7th RC, and Carlos Ramos de Alencar, from the 8th. According to Major José Campedelli, staff officer of the 2nd DC, General Camarinha's continuity in command was important to prevent them from obstructing the coup. Still, for him Knaack obeyed very reluctantly. Lt. Col. Amerino Raposo Filho, commander of the 4th 75mm Horse Artillery Group, defines Knaack's answer as ambiguous. Alencar, on the other hand, joined so as not to stand out from the other units, but was initially undecided. In Quaraí the commander of the 5th RC, Colonel Edson Boscacci Guedes, complied with the division's orders, but 49 of his 54 sergeants, encouraged by Captain Jorge Silveira, did not accept the order to move out of the city. The sergeants were left behind and replaced by corporals, and these, by soldiers.

In Uruguaiana the 4th 75mm Horse Artillery Group stood out, which was already since early March organized into combat groups, with light armament and ammunition in reserves, ready for use as infantry in an anti-guerrilla mission. The commander, Lieutenant Colonel Amerino Raposo Filho, had for some time been proselytizing politically against the government.

In Alegrete, the 6th RC was on the side of the division command. However, the garrison commander was the commander of the 12th Combat Engineering Battalion (BE Comb), Lieutenant Colonel Adão Prestes do Monte, described by a trainee of the division's General Staff as "a military man of leftist tendencies, who gave us trouble." As he was a legalist, Major Floriano Aguilar Chagas was sent to ensure control of the city. He reports finding the sergeants supporting Monte and a large union presence, but the other units were not legalistic. Chagas tried to convince Monte by stating that he could be crushed by the rest of the division, but even on day 2 he still had not joined. (Note: p. 74: "I told him to make a manifesto for the civilian population announcing which side the garrison was on, recommending tranquility and forbidding any street demonstrations. I went to sleep in the 6th RC. The next day, when I returned to the BE, Colonel Monte still hadn't made the document.") The officers of the 12th BE Comb even conspired against their commander and there were also preparations for an offensive against the battalion, but they were not necessary, as Monte eventually joined. This was stressful for him, as he needed to break his commitments to the leftists in the city.

The 2nd Mechanized Reconnaissance Regiment was part of the division, but was based in Porto Alegre. Its commander, Colonel Francisco Guedes Machado, remained loyal to the government.

In Uruguaiana the Navy had a harbourmaster and a platoon of marines. Several other platoons were distributed along the Uruguay River, such as in Itaqui and in São Borja, already in the territory of the 1st DC, and had a good radio system. At the headquarters of the 2nd DC, Commander Dilo Modesto de Almeida joined the coup and contributed to the Marine platoon.

=== 3rd Cavalry Division ===
In Bagé, General Hugo Garrastazu, (Note: Cited as Emílio Garrastazu Médici's cousin in Motta (2003, p. 273, Vol. 13), or as unrelated in Vol. 15, p. 276.) of the 3rd DC, was "considered a government man", and, according to the report of one of his captains, did not consider the "Revolution" necessary, that is, the movement to overthrow the president. His joining on the 1st occurred when he was isolated, General Kruel, to whom he was very attached, had already joined, and several of his officers, in addition to the commander of the 2nd DC, were trying to convince him to change sides. The social environment of the city, with strong action by the Federation of Rural Associations of Rio Grande do Sul (FARSUL) against "rural agitation", may have influenced it. However, according to Colonel Couto, Garrastazú doubted whether he could fulfill any mission. After the coup, he was not revoked, but his career ended there. For Ernani Corrêa de Azambuja, then Goulart's captain and aide-de-camp, at least in the beginning Garrastazu's attitude was effectively one of support for Jango.

There was disruption at the headquarters itself, where the sergeants captured the headquarters and arrested the officers. Garrastazu managed to escape. An account of the situation in Bagé is given by Lélio Gonçalves Rodrigues da Silva, a captain in the 3rd 75mm Cavalry Artillery Regiment (3º RA 75 Cav). On one side were the general and the colonels of the units - Osmar Mendes Paixão Cortes (3rd RA 75 Cav), Washington Bandeira (12th RC), and Jaci Brum Braga (3rd Mechanized Reconnaissance Regiment). On the other side, sergeants (in HQ, but with the sympathy of their comrades in the mechanized regiment) and civilians including mayor José Maria Ferraz. Paixão had his regiment in hand, as he made his position explicit early on and made no room for dissent. (Note: Major Renato Moreira, who served not in the 3rd DC but on the staff of the 3rd Army, also considers Colonel Paixão an important leader in Bagé. Motta (2003, p. 348, Vol. 8)) He also had civilian support, being president of the Rural Association.

This was not the case with the others. Braga never clarified the situation to his commanders, and so his regiment lived an "odd situation": sergeants and officers didn't antagonize each other and spent the day normally, but at night they were segregated and guarded against each other. There was no unity in the Flag regiment, and the vast majority of the sergeants were legalists. Throughout days 1 and 2 the coup plotters, mainly through the 3rd RA 75 Cav, managed to defeat the civilian legalist demonstrations, while the sergeants at HQ accepted the surrender.

The cavalry regiments were the 9th, from São Gabriel, 12th, from Bagé, 13th, from Jaguarão, and 14th, from Dom Pedrito. Besides the 12th, already mentioned, the 9th and the other units in its city were in favor of the coup. The commander of the 14th was against it, and the favorable officers fled to Bagé. In the 13th, the situation is not clear. According to Rodrigues da Silva, no information about the commander's position came to light. Azambuja states that that regiment did not join the coup. In Pelotas there was a rumor, later denied, that this regiment had left its headquarters to attack the city. Lieutenant-Colonel Agostini cites Jaguarão and Dom Pedrito as garrisons in which Garrastazu "faced very serious moments" but overcame them through parlimentation.

=== Smaller units ===
Colonel Guerreiro Brito, commander of the 3rd Road Battalion in Vacaria, remained loyal to Ladário's authority. Some subordinates favorable to the coup conspired against him and were arrested. Among them was Captain João Carlos Rotta, for whom Colonel Brito was a Marxist, was about to get an appointment to general, and was engaged to the extreme in the defense of his stretch of the Santa Catarina border. Only late on April 2, under orders from the 3rd Army to surrender his command, did he accept defeat. After his departure from command, there were rumors of an impending revolt of sergeants.

The 1st Railway Battalion, from Bento Gonçalves, and the 3rd Automatic Anti-aircraft Cannon Group, from Caxias do Sul, joined the coup at 01:00 and 01:45 in the morning of the 2nd, placing themselves at the disposal of the 3rd DI.

=== Parallel command in Santa Maria ===
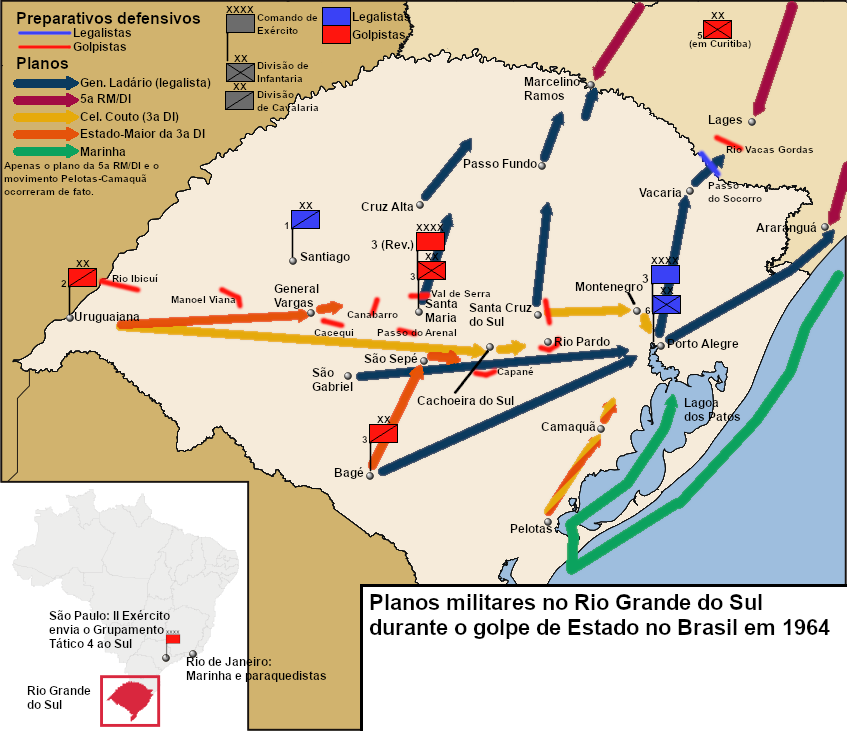
Plans for offensive against Porto Alegre.

At 09:10 General Poppe decided to declare himself commander of the 3rd Army, and at 10:00 General Costa e Silva, who had taken over the Ministry of War in Rio de Janeiro, agreed with his decision. The news was spread by radio to the other commands. At this point Poppe already had with him the 3rd DI and the 5th DIs, the 2nd and 3rd DCs, and part of the 6th DI. Military historian Hernani D'Aguiar considers only the 3rd DI and the 2nd and 3rd DCs as members, and this is how he narrates what happened: "The Cmt of the 3rd DI decides not to follow orders from General Ladário anymore and (...) constitutes the 3rd Revolutionary Army to march with him on Porto Alegre". There was a possible clash between the 3rd Revolutionary Army, under Poppe de Figueiredo, and the 3rd Army, under Ladário Teles. The 5th RM/DI had been provisionally incorporated by Costa e Silva into the II Army. Revolution is the term used in the barracks for the coup d'état. (Note: See, for example, Cardoso (2011))

According to Lieutenant Colonel Agostini, the idea circulated in Santa Maria that morning and sought to coordinate the rebellious forces in the state and prevent a hasty and isolated onslaught by any of them. According to him, this surprised everyone: Ladário, "because he did not expect that a comrade from Santa Maria would say he was the commander of the 3rd Army," the other divisions, and even Costa e Silva. Majors Chagas and Campedelli cite the idea's presence in Uruguaiana, aiming to "neutralize Ladário's determinations" and prevent a more modern general from taking over before Poppe. The idea was to "neutralize Ladário's determinations" and prevent a more modern general from taking over before Poppe.

However, on the same morning that this command was formed, João Goulart met with his generals and Brizola in Porto Alegre. His military situation was dramatic. Ladário still wanted to fight, but Goulart refused bloodshed and at 11:30 am he took a plane to São Borja, later going into exile in Uruguay. For Ladário, all that was left was to accept Costa e Silva's authority and the surrender of the command. At 09:00 on April 3, he took off for Rio de Janeiro. His departure, under Costa e Silva's call, was a way to avoid a clash. General Adalberto returned to Porto Alegre in the morning, and in the afternoon Governor Meneghetti and General Poppe arrived in the city. On April 10 he was appointed acting commander of the 3rd Army, remaining in that position until July. Ladário was transferred to the reserve.

== See also ==
- Operation Farroupilha
- Brazilian Army
- João Goulart
- Leonel Brizola
- 3rd Army

== Bibliography ==
=== Books ===
- Bastos, Joaquim Justino Alves (1966). "A revolução de 1964 em Porto Alegre" (PDF). Encontro com o tempo (in Portuguese). Porto Alegre: Globo. In: O Tuiuti, n. 39, nov. 2012.
- Bento, Cláudio Moreira (org.); Giorgis, Luiz Ernani Caminha (2018). História do Comando Militar do Sul: 1953-2018 e Antecedentes (PDF) (in Portuguese) (2nd ed.). Porto Alegre/Resende: FAHIMTB.
- D'Aguiar, Hernani (1976). A Revolução por Dentro (in Portuguese). São Cristóvão: Artenova.
- Ferreira, Jorge (2011). João Goulart: uma biografia (in Portuguese) (4th ed.). Rio de Janeiro: Civilização Brasileira.
- Konrad, Diorge Alceno; Lameira, Rafael Fantinel (2014). "O golpe civil-militar de 1964 e o Rio Grande do Sul: historiografia e história". In Batistella, Alessandro (ed.). O golpe civil-militar de 1964 no Sul do Brasil (in Portuguese). Chapecó: Argos.
- Lopes, José Machado (1980). O III Exército na crise da renúncia de Jânio Quadros (in Portuguese). Rio de Janeiro: Alhambra.
- Motta, Aricildes de Morais (2003). 1964-31 de março: O movimento revolucionário e sua história. História Oral do Exército (in Portuguese). Rio de Janeiro: Biblioteca do Exército Editora. Archived from the original on 2021-01-14.
- Ribeiro, Aldo Ladeira (1987). Esboço histórico da Brigada Militar do Rio Grande do Sul v. 3 (1930-1961) (PDF) (in Portuguese) (1st ed.). Porto Alegre: MBM.
- Silva, Hélio (2014). 1964: Golpe ou Contragolpe? (in Portuguese). Porto Alegre: L&PM.

=== Articles and academic works ===
- Axt, Gunter (2020). "Resistência e derrota do Presidente João Goulart, em abril de 1964, em Porto Alegre". Revista IHGB (483). Rio de Janeiro: IHGB: 303–332. Archived from the original on 2021-04-15.
- Azevedo, Graciele Martini de; Konrad, Diorge Alceno (2009). "A existência de um "campo de concentração" em 1964 em Itaqui no Rio Grande do Sul". Ágora (in Portuguese). 15 (2). Santa Cruz do Sul: 58–67.
- Batistella, Alessandro (2014). "O governo Ney Braga e o golpe civil-militar de 1964 no Paraná" (PDF). Diálogos (in Portuguese). 18 (suplemento especial). Maringá: 203–242. doi:10.4025/dialogos.v18supl.902.
- Berni, Antonio Augusto D. (2013). "O Golpe Civil-Militar de 1964 em Santa Maria/RS: divisão de forças e sustentação política". Revista Brasileira de História & Ciências Sociais (in Portuguese). 5 (10): 128–146.
- Cardoso, Lucileide Costa (2011). "Os discursos de celebração da 'Revolução de 1964'". Revista Brasileira de História (in Portuguese). 31 (62): 117–140. doi:10.1590/S0102-01882011000200008.
- Dutra, José Carlos (2004). "A revolução de 1964 e o movimento militar no Paraná: a visão da caserna". Revista de Sociologia e Política (in Portuguese) (22): 195–208. doi:10.1590/S0104-44782004000100014.
- Faria, Fabiano Godinho (2013). João Goulart e os militares na crise dos anos de 1960 (PDF) (PhD thesis) (in Portuguese). Rio de Janeiro: Universidade Federal do Rio de Janeiro. Archived (PDF) from the original on 10 November 2021.
- Lameira, Rafael Fantinel (2012). O Golpe civil-militar de 1964 no Rio Grande do Sul: a ação política liberal-conservadora (PDF) (Masters thesis) (in Portuguese). Porto Alegre: UFRGS.
- Pedrosa, Fernando Velôzo Gomes (2018). Modernização e reestruturação do Exército brasileiro (1960-1980) (PhD thesis) (in Portuguese). Rio de Janeiro: UFRJ.
- Pinto, Daniel Cerqueira (2015). General Olympio Mourão Filho: Carreira Político-Militar e Participação nos Acontecimentos de 1964 (PDF) (Masters thesis) (in Portuguese). Juiz de Fora: UFJF.
- Rolim, César Daniel de Assis (2009). Leonel Brizola e os setores subalternos das Forças Armadas Brasileiras: 1961-1964 (PDF) (Masters thesis) (in Portuguese). UFRGS.
- Savian, Elonir José (2014). Haverá sempre uma Cavalaria: tradição e modernização no processo de evolução tecnológica do Exército Brasileiro (in Portuguese). Resende: edição do autor.
- Tibola, Ana Paula Lima (2007). A Escola Superior de Guerra e a Doutrina de Segurança Nacional (1949-1966) (PDF) (Masters thesis) (in Portuguese). Passo Fundo: UPF.
- Zimmermann, Lausimar José (2013). Sargentos de 1964 : como a disciplina superou a política (PDF) (Masters thesis) (in Portuguese). CPDOC.

=== Documents ===
- Coelho, Dario (2003) [1964]. "Relatório da 5ª RM - 5ª DI concernente ao movimento militar de 31 de março de 1964" (PDF). In Motta, Aricildes de Morais (ed.). 1964-31 de março: O movimento revolucionário e sua história. História Oral do Exército (in Portuguese). Vol. 8. Rio de Janeiro: Biblioteca do Exército Editora. pp. 107–124.
- Pereira, José Canavarro (2003) [1964]. "A revolução de 31 de março de 1964 na 3ª DI" (PDF). In Motta, Aricildes de Morais (ed.). 1964-31 de março: O movimento revolucionário e sua história. História Oral do Exército (in Portuguese). Vol. 13. Rio de Janeiro: Biblioteca do Exército Editora. pp. 48–82.
