= Southern Military Command =

- Comando Militar do Sul
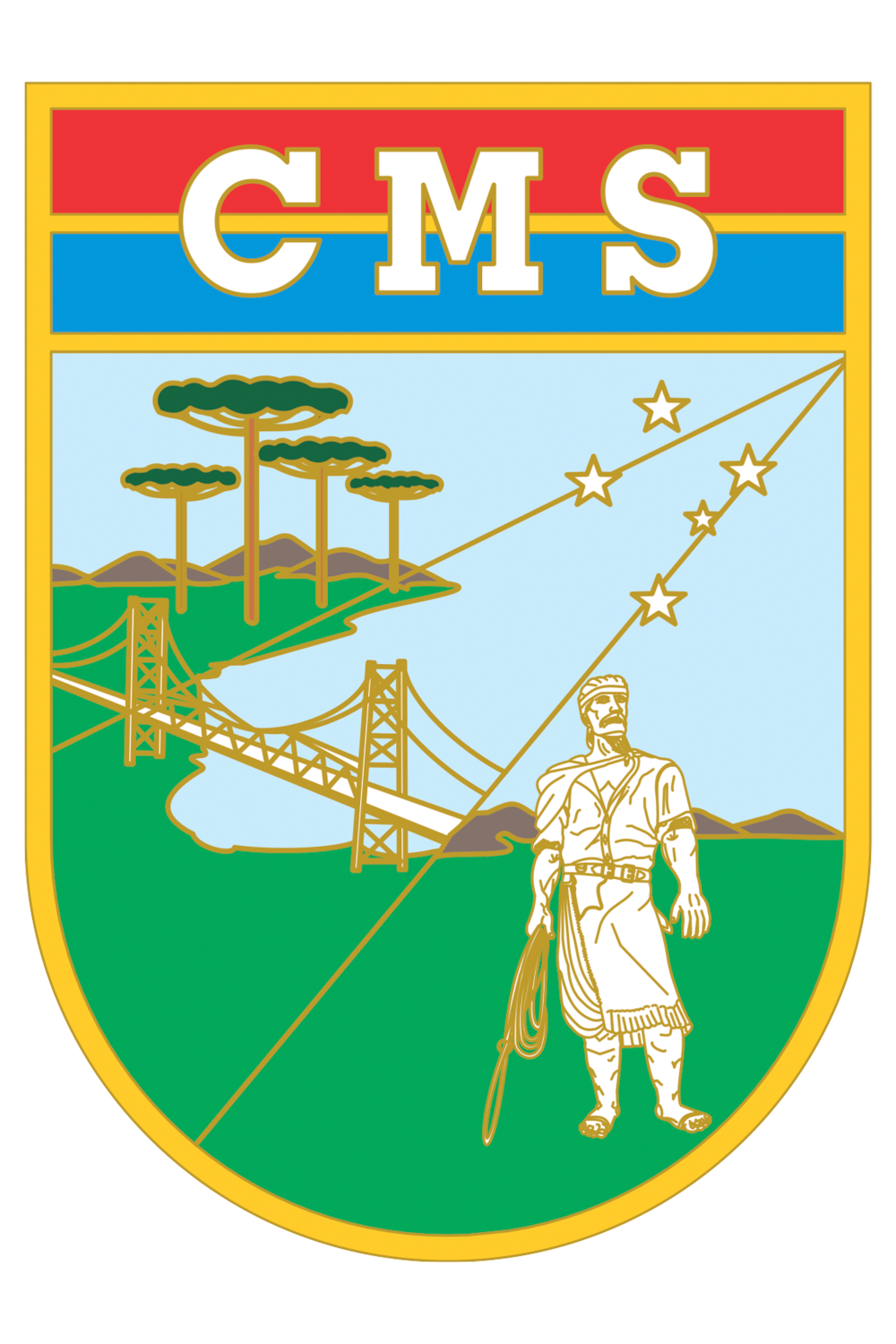
- Emblem of the Southern Military Command
- Active: 1953; 73 years ago
- Country: Brazil
- Branch: Brazilian Army
- Part of: Ministry of Defence
- Garrison/HQ: Porto Alegre
- Nickname: CMS
- Website: www.cms.eb.mil.br

Commanders
- Current commander: General Hertz Pires do Nascimento

The Southern Military Command (Portuguese: Comando Militar do Sul or CMS) is one of eight Military Commands of the Brazilian Army. The Southern Military Command is responsible for the defence of the states of Rio Grande do Sul, Paraná and Santa Catarina.

== Structure ==
Area of the Comando Militar do Sul 2017

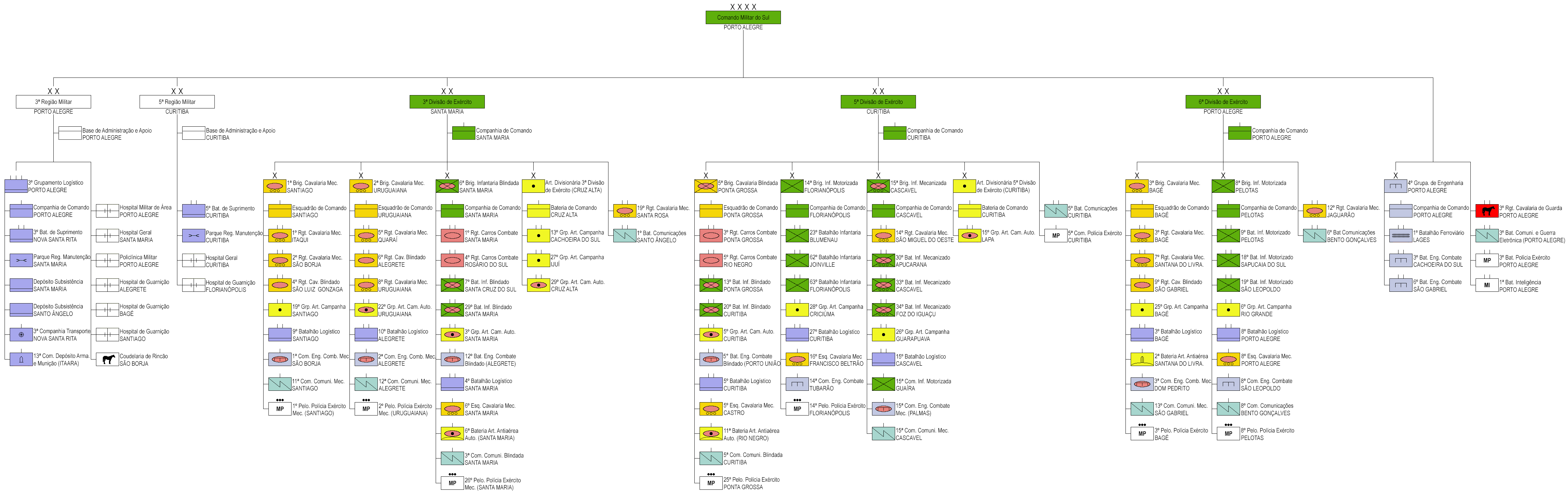
Structure of the Comando Militar do Sul 2017 (click to enlarge)

- Southern Military Command (Comando Militar do Sul) in Porto Alegre
  - 3rd Guard Cavalry Regiment (3º Regimento de Cavalaria de Guarda) in Porto Alegre
  - 3rd Signals and Electronic Warfare Battalion (3º Batalhão de Comunicações e Guerra Eletrônica) in Porto Alegre
  - 3rd Military Police Battalion (3º Batalhão de Polícia do Exército) in Porto Alegre
  - 1st Military Intelligence Battalion (1ª Batalhão de Inteligência Militar) in Porto Alegre
  - Training Center - South (Centro de Adestramento - Sul) in Santa Maria
  - Armored Vehicle Training Center (Centro de Instrução de Blindados) in Santa Maria
  - Butiá Training Center (Campo de Instrução de Butiá) in Butiá
  - 4th Engineer Group' (4º Grupamento de Engenharia) in Porto Alegre
    - 1st Railroad Battalion (1º Batalhão Ferroviário) in Lages
    - 3rd Combat Engineer Battalion (3º Batalhão de Engenharia de Combate) in Cachoeira do Sul
    - 6th Combat Engineer Battalion (6º Batalhão de Engenharia de Combate) in São Gabriel
    - Regional Works Commission of the 3rd Military Region (Comissão Regional de Obras da 3ª Região Militar)
    - Regional Works Commission of the 5th Military Region (Comissão Regional de Obras da 5ª Região Militar)

=== 3rd Military Region ===
- 3rd Military Region (3ª Região Militar) in Porto Alegre covering the Rio Grande do Sul state
  - 3rd Military Region Administration and Support Base (Base de Administração e Apoio da 3ª Região Militar) in Porto Alegre
  - Porto Alegre Military Area Hospital (Hospital Militar de Área de Porto Alegre) in Porto Alegre
  - Military Polyclinic Porto Alegre (Policlínica Militar do Porto Alegre) in Porto Alegre
  - Alegrete Garrison Hospital (Hospital da Guarnição de Alegrete) in Alegrete
  - Bagé Garrison Hospital (Hospital da Guarnição de Bagé) in Bagé
  - Santa Maria Garrison Hospital (Hospital da Guarnição de Santa Maria) in Santa Maria
  - Santiago Garrison Hospital (Hospital da Guarnição de Santiago) in Santiago
  - Barão de São Borja Training Camp (Campo de Instrução Barão de São Borja) in Rosário do Sul
  - Rincão Stud Farm (Coudelaria de Rincão)
  - Rincão Training Center (Centro de Instrução de Rincão)
- 3rd Logistics Group (3º Grupamento Logístico) in Porto Alegre
  - HQ Company 3rd Logistics Group (Companhia de Comando do 3º Grupamento Logístico) in Porto Alegre
  - 3rd Supply Battalion (3º Batalhão de Suprimento) in Nova Santa Rita
  - 3rd Transport Company (3ª Companhia de Transportes) in Nova Santa Rita (Note: Military Organization (OM) established; Unit to be activated in January 2028.)
  - 3rd Military Region Regional Maintenance Park (Parque Regional de Manutenção da 3ª Região Militar) in Santa Maria
  - Santa Maria Matériel Depot (Depósito de Subsistência de Santa Maria) in Santa Maria
  - Santo Ângelo Matériel Depot (Depósito de Subsistência de Santo Ângelo) in Santo Ângelo
  - 13th Weapons and Ammunition Depot Company (13ª Companhia Depósito de Armamento e Munição) in Santa Maria

=== 5th Military Region ===
- 5th Military Region (5ª Região Militar) in Curitiba covering the Paraná and Santa Catarina states
  - 5th Military Region Administration and Support Base (Base de Administração e Apoio da 5ª Região Militar) in Curitiba
  - 5th Military Region Regional Maintenance Park (Parque Regional de Manutenção da 5ª Região Militar) in Curitiba
  - 5th Supply Battalion (5º Batalhão de Suprimento) in Curitiba
  - Curitiba General Hospital (Hospital Geral de Curitiba) in Curitiba
  - Florianópolis Garrison Hospital (Hospital da Guarnição de Florianópolis) in Florianópolis
  - Marechal Hermes Training Center (Centro de Instrução Marechal Hermes) in Três Barras

=== 3rd Army Division ===
- 3rd Army Division (3ª Divisão de Exército) in Santa Maria
  - HQ Company 3rd Army Division (Companhia de Comando da 3ª Divisão de Exército) in Santa Maria
  - Santa Maria Garrison Administrative Base (Base Administrativa da Guarnição de Santa Maria) in Santa Maria
  - 1st Signals Battalion (1º Batalhão de Comunicações) in Santo Ângelo
  - 19th Mechanized Cavalry Regiment (19º Regimento de Cavalaria Mecanizado) in Santa Rosa
  - Santa Maria Training Center (Centro de Instrução de Santa Maria) in Santa Maria
  - 3rd Division Artillery (Artilharia Divisionária da 3ª Divisão de Exército) in Cruz Alta
    - HQ Battery 3rd Division Artillery (Bateria de Comando da Artilharia Divisionária da 3ª DE) in Cruz Alta
    - 13th Field Artillery Group (27º Grupo de Artilharia de Campanha) in Cachoeira do Sul
    - 27th Field Artillery Group (27º Grupo de Artilharia de Campanha) in Ijuí
    - 29th Self-propelled Field Artillery Group (29º Grupo de Artilharia de Campanha Autopropulsado) in Cruz Alta
  - 1st Mechanized Cavalry Brigade (1ª Brigada de Cavalaria Mecanizada) in Santiago
    - HQ Squadron 1st Mechanized Cavalry Brigade (Esquadrão de Comando da 1ª Brigada de Cavalaria Mecanizada) in Santiago
    - 1st Mechanized Cavalry Regiment (1º Regimento de Cavalaria Mecanizado) in Itaqui
    - 2nd Mechanized Cavalry Regiment (2º Regimento de Cavalaria Mecanizado) in São Borja
    - 4th Armored Cavalry Regiment (4º Regimento de Cavalaria Blindado) in São Luiz Gonzaga
    - 19th Field Artillery Group (19º Grupo de Artilharia de Campanha) in Santiago
    - 9th Logistics Battalion (9º Batalhão Logístico) in Santiago
    - 1st Mechanized Combat Engineer Company (1ª Companhia de Engenharia de Combate Mecanizada) in São Borja
    - 11th Mechanized Signals Company (11ª Companhia de Comunicações Mecanizada) in Santiago
    - 1st Mechanized Military Police Platoon (1º Pelotão de Polícia do Exército Mecanizado) in Santiago
  - 2nd Mechanized Cavalry Brigade (2ª Brigada de Cavalaria Mecanizada) in Uruguaiana
    - HQ Squadron 2nd Mechanized Cavalry Brigade (Esquadrão de Comando da 2ª Brigada de Cavalaria Mecanizada) in Uruguaiana
    - 5th Mechanized Cavalry Regiment (5º Regimento de Cavalaria Mecanizado) in Quaraí
    - 6th Armored Cavalry Regiment (6º Regimento de Cavalaria Blindado) in Alegrete
    - 8th Mechanized Cavalry Regiment (8º Regimento de Cavalaria Mecanizado) in Uruguaiana
    - 22nd Self-propelled Field Artillery Group (22º Grupo de Artilharia de Campanha Autopropulsado) in Uruguaiana
    - 10th Logistics Battalion (10º Batalhão Logístico) in Alegrete
    - 2nd Mechanized Combat Engineer Company (2ª Companhia de Engenharia de Combate Mecanizada) in Alegrete
    - 12th Signals Company (12ª Companhia de Comunicações) in Alegrete
    - 2nd Mechanized Military Police Platoon (2º Pelotão de Polícia do Exército Mecanizado) in Uruguaiana
  - 6th Armored Infantry Brigade (6ª Brigada de Infantaria Blindada) in Santa Maria
    - HQ Company 6th Armored Infantry Brigade (Companhia de Comando da 6ª Brigada de Infantaria Blindada) in Santa Maria
    - 1st Tank Regiment (1º Regimento de Carros de Combate) in Santa Maria
    - 4th Tank Regiment (4º Regimento de Carros de Combate) in Rosário do Sul
    - 7th Armored Infantry Battalion (7º Batalhão de Infantaria Blindado) in Santa Cruz do Sul
    - 29th Armored Infantry Battalion (29º Batalhão de Infantaria Blindado) in Santa Maria
    - 3rd Self-propelled Field Artillery Group (3º Grupo de Artilharia de Campanha Autopropulsado) in Santa Maria
    - 12th Armored Combat Engineer Battalion (12º Batalhão de Engenharia de Combate Blindado) in Alegrete
    - 4th Logistics Battalion (4º Batalhão Logístico) in Santa Maria
    - 6th Mechanized Cavalry Squadron (6º Esquadrão de Cavalaria Mecanizado) in Santa Maria
    - 6th Air Defence Artillery Battery (6ª Bateria de Artilharia Anti-Aérea) in Santa Maria
    - 3rd Armored Signals Company (3ª Companhia de Comunicações Blindada) in Santa Maria
    - 26th Mechanized Military Police Platoon (26º Pelotão de Polícia do Exército Mecanizado) in Santa Maria

=== 5th Army Division ===
- 5th Army Division (5ª Divisão de Exército) in Curitiba
  - 5th Military Police Company (5ª Companhia de Polícia do Exército) in Curitiba
  - 5th Division Artillery (Artilharia Divisionária da 5ª Divisão de Exército) in Curitiba
    - HQ Battery 5th Division Artillery (Bateria de Comando da Artilharia Divisionária da 5ª DE) in Curitiba
    - 15th Self-propelled Field Artillery Group (15º Grupo de Artilharia de Campanha Autopropulsado) in Lapa
  - 5th Armored Cavalry Brigade (5ª Brigada de Cavalaria Blindada) in Ponta Grossa
    - HQ Squadron 5th Armored Cavalry Brigade (Esquadrão de Comando da 5ª Brigada de Cavalaria Blindada) in Ponta Grossa
    - 3rd Tank Regiment (3º Regimento de Carros de Combate) in Ponta Grossa
    - 5th Tank Regiment (5º Regimento de Carros de Combate) in Rio Negro
    - 13th Armored Infantry Battalion (13º Batalhão de Infantaria Blindado) in Ponta Grossa
    - 20th Armored Infantry Battalion (20º Batalhão de Infantaria Blindado) in Curitiba
    - 5th Self-propelled Field Artillery Group (5º Grupo de Artilharia de Campanha Autopropulsado) in Curitiba
    - 5th Armored Combat Engineer Battalion (5° Batalhão de Engenharia de Combate Blindado) in Porto União
    - 5th Logistics Battalion (5º Batalhão Logístico) in Curitiba
    - 5th Mechanized Cavalry Squadron (5º Esquadrão de Cavalaria Mecanizado) in Castro
    - 5th Armored Signals Company (5ª Companhia de Comunicações Blindada) in Curitiba (Note: Will be transferred to Ponta Grossa, starting in October 2026)
    - 25th Military Police Platoon (25º Pelotão de Polícia do Exército) in Ponta Grossa
  - 14th Motorized Infantry Brigade (14ª Brigada de Infantaria Motorizada) in Florianópolis
    - HQ Company 14th Motorized Infantry Brigade (Companhia de Comando da 14ª Brigada de Infantaria Motorizada) in Florianópolis
    - 27th Logistics Battalion (27º Batalhão Logístico) in Curitiba
    - 23rd Motorized Infantry Battalion (23º Batalhão de Infantaria) in Blumenau
    - 62nd Motorized Infantry Battalion (62º Batalhão de Infantaria) in Joinville
    - 63rd Motorized Infantry Battalion (63º Batalhão de Infantaria) in Florianópolis
    - 28th Field Artillery Group (28º Grupo de Artilharia de Campanha) in Criciúma
    - 14th Combat Engineer Company (14ª Companhia de Engenharia de Combate) in Tubarão
    - 16th Mechanized Cavalry Squadron (16º Esquadrão de Cavalaria Mecanizado) in Francisco Beltrão
    - 14th Military Police Platoon (14º Pelotão de Polícia do Exército) in Florianópolis
  - 15th Mechanized Infantry Brigade (15ª Brigada de Infantaria Mecanizada) in Cascavel
    - HQ Company 15th Mechanized Infantry Brigade (Companhia de Comando da 15ª Brigada de Infantaria Mecanizada) in Cascavel
    - 30th Mechanized Infantry Battalion (30º Batalhão de Infantaria Mecanizado) in Apucarana
    - 33rd Mechanized Infantry Battalion (33º Batalhão de Infantaria Mecanizado) in Cascavel
    - 34th Mechanized Infantry Battalion (34º Batalhão de Infantaria Mecanizado) in Foz do Iguaçu
    - 26th Field Artillery Group (26º Grupo de Artilharia de Campanha) in Guarapuava
    - 14th Mechanized Cavalry Regiment (14º Regimento de Cavalaria Mecanizado) in São Miguel
    - 15th Logistics Battalion (15º Batalhão Logístico) in Cascavel
    - 15th Motorized Infantry Company (15ª Companhia de Infantaria Motorizada) in Guaíra
    - 15th Mechanized Combat Engineer Company (15ª Companhia de Engenharia de Combate Mecanizada) in Palmas
    - 15th Mechanized Signals Company (15ª Companhia de Comunicações Mecanizada) in Cascavel

=== 6th Army Division ===
- ¨6th Army Division (6ª Divisão de Exército) in Porto Alegre
  - 12th Mechanized Cavalry Regiment (12º Regimento de Cavalaria Mecanizado) in Jaguarão
  - 6th Signals Battalion (6º Batalhão de Comunicações) in Bento Gonçalves
  - 8th Motorized Infantry Brigade (8ª Brigada de Infantaria Motorizada) in Pelotas
    - HQ Company 8th Motorized Infantry Brigade (Companhia de Comando da 8ª Brigada de Infantaria Motorizada) in Pelotas
    - 9th Motorized Infantry Battalion (9º Batalhão de Infantaria Motorizado) in Pelotas
    - 18th Motorized Infantry Battalion (18º Batalhão de Infantaria Motorizado) in Sapucaia do Sul
    - 19th Motorized Infantry Battalion (19º Batalhão de Infantaria Motorizado) in São Leopoldo
    - 6th Field Artillery Group (6º Grupo de Artilharia de Campanha) in Rio Grande
    - 8th Logistics Battalion (8º Batalhão Logístico) in Porto Alegre
    - 8th Mechanized Combat Engineer Company (8ª Companhia de Engenharia de Combate Mecanizada) in São Leopoldo
    - 8th Mechanized Cavalry Squadron (8º Esquadrão de Cavalaria Mecanizado) in Porto Alegre
    - 8th Military Police Platoon (8º Pelotão de Polícia do Exército) in Pelotas
  - 3rd Mechanized Cavalry Brigade (3ª Brigada de Cavalaria Mecanizada) in Bagé
    - HQ Squadron 3rd Mechanized Cavalry Brigade (Esquadrão de Comando da 3ª Brigada de Cavalaria Mecanizada) in Bagé
    - 3rd Mechanized Cavalry Regiment (3º Regimento de Cavalaria Mecanizado) in Bagé
    - 7th Mechanized Cavalry Regiment (7º Regimento de Cavalaria Mecanizado) in Santana do Livramento
    - 9th Armored Cavalry Regiment (9º Regimento de Cavalaria Blindado) in São Gabriel
    - 25th Field Artillery Group (25º Grupo de Artilharia de Campanha) in Bagé
    - 3rd Logistics Battalion (3º Batalhão Logístico) in Bagé
    - 2nd Air Defence Artillery Battery (2ª Bateria de Artilharia Anti-Aérea) in Santana do Livramento
    - 3rd Mechanized Combat Engineer Company (3ª Companhia de Engenharia de Combate Mecanizada) in Dom Pedrito
    - 13th Mechanized Signals Company (13º Companhia Comunicações Mecanizada) in São Gabriel
    - 3rd Military Police Platoon (3º Pelotão de Polícia do Exército) in Bagé

== See also ==
- Revolutionary 3rd Army
