= 1964 Brazilian coup d'état =

Coup d'état in Brazil that ousted President João Goulart

- Part of the Cold War
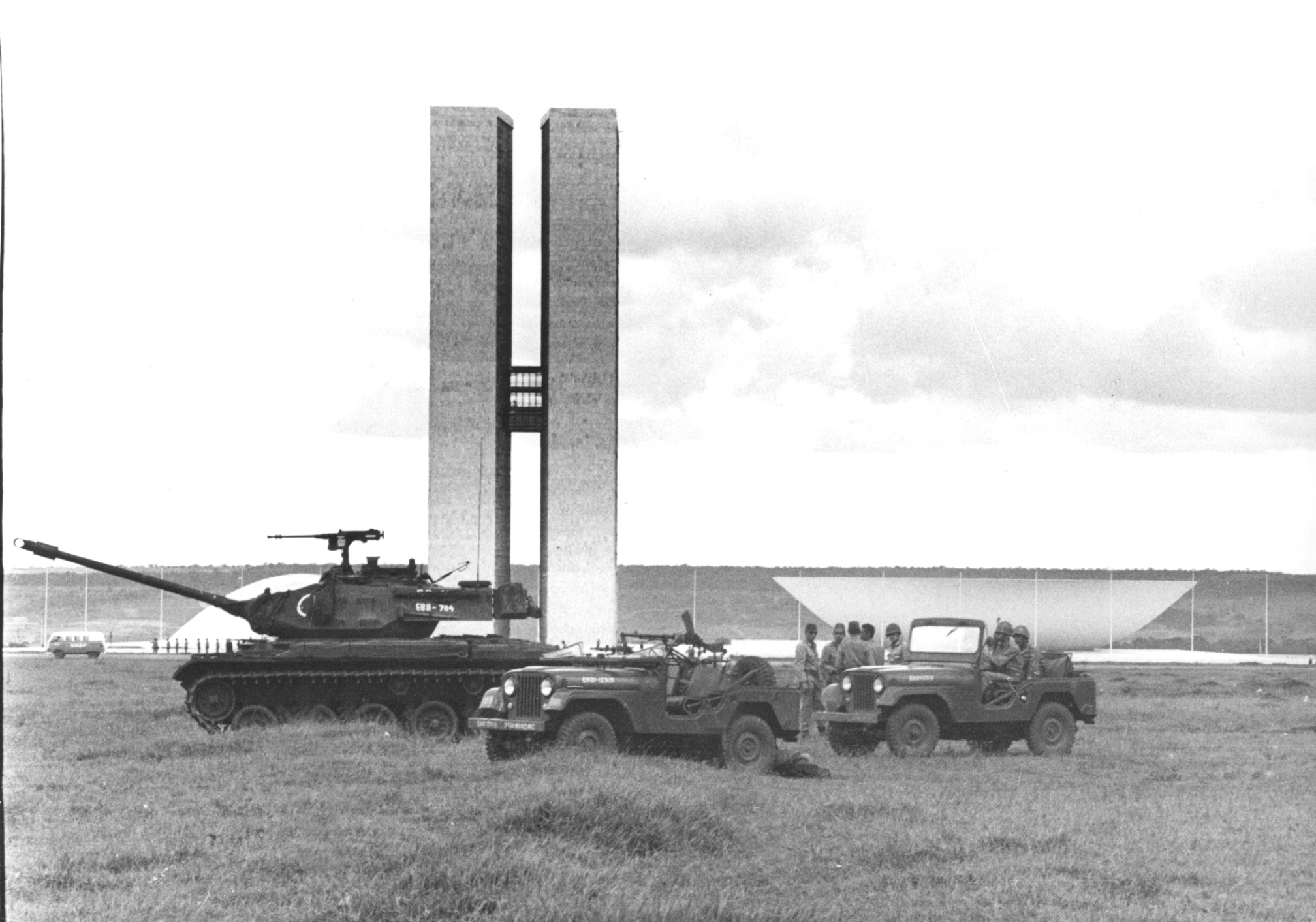
- M41 tank and two jeeps of the Brazilian Army in the Ministries Esplanade, near the National Congress Palace (background) in Brasília, 1964
Date	March 31 – April 1, 1964 (Note: Events in Rio Grande do Sul continued on the 2nd, when the coup still did not control the entire state.)
Location	Brazil
Result	Coup successful; • João Goulart's government overthrown; • Beginning of the military dictatorship

Belligerents
(Brazil) Brazilian Government; Armed Forces (loyalist); Supported by: State governors: Pernambuco; Sergipe; National Union of Students Peasant Leagues	Armed Forces (rebel); Supported by: State governors: Alagoas; Espírito Santo; Guanabara; Minas Gerais; Paraná; Rio Grande do Sul; São Paulo; Congressional opposition United States

Commanders and leaders
João Goulart; Leonel Brizola; Armando Âncora; Ladário Pereira Teles	Olímpio Mourão Filho; Castelo Branco; Costa e Silva; Amaury Kruel; Augusto Rademaker; Francisco de Melo; Auro de Moura Andrade; Magalhães Pinto

Casualties and losses
- 7 pro-government civilians killed

The 1964 Brazilian coup d'état (Portuguese: Golpe de estado no Brasil em 1964) was the overthrow of Brazilian president João Goulart by a military coup from March 31 to April 1, 1964, ending the Fourth Brazilian Republic (1946–1964) and initiating the Brazilian military dictatorship (1964–1985). The coup took the form of a military rebellion, the declaration of vacancy in the presidency by the National Congress on April 2, the formation of a military junta (the Supreme Command of the Revolution) and the exile of the president on April 4. In his place, Ranieri Mazzilli, the president of the Chamber of Deputies, took over until the election by Congress of general Humberto de Alencar Castelo Branco, one of the leaders of the coup.

Democratically elected vice president in 1960, Jango, as Goulart was known, assumed power after the resignation of president Jânio Quadros, in 1961, and the Legality Campaign, which defeated an attempted military coup to prevent his inauguration. During his government, the economic crisis and social conflicts deepened. Social, political, labor, peasant, and student movements, along with low-ranking military personnel, rallied behind a set of "base reforms" proposed by President Goulart. He met growing opposition among the elite, the urban middle class, a large portion of the officer corps of the armed forces, the Catholic Church and the press, who accused him of threatening the legal order of the country, colluding with communists, causing social chaos and weakening the military hierarchy. Throughout his tenure, Goulart had faced numerous efforts to pressure and destabilize his government and plots to overthrow him. Brazil's relations with the United States deteriorated and the American government allied with opposition forces and their efforts, supporting the coup. Goulart lost the support of the center, failed to secure the approval of the base reforms in Congress and, in the final stage of his government, relied on pressure from reformist movements to overcome the resistance of the legislature, leading to the peak of the political crisis in March 1964.

On March 31, a rebellion broke out in Minas Gerais, led by a group of military officers with support of some governors. Loyalist troops and rebels prepared for combat, but Goulart did not want a civil war. The loyalists initially had the upper hand, but mass defections weakened the president's military situation. He traveled successively from Rio de Janeiro to Brasília, Porto Alegre, the interior of Rio Grande do Sul, and then to Uruguay, where he went into exile. By April 1, the coup leaders controlled most of the country, securing Rio Grande do Sul on the 2nd. In the early hours of April 2, Congress declared Goulart's position vacant while he was still within Brazilian territory. Efforts to defend his presidency, such as a call for a general strike, were insufficient. While some sectors of society welcomed the self-proclaimed "revolution" by the military, others faced severe repression. The political class anticipated a swift return to civilian rule, but in the following years an authoritarian, nationalist, and pro-American dictatorship took hold.

Historians, political scientists, and sociologists have offered various interpretations of the event, viewing it both as the establishment of a military dictatorship and the culmination of recurring political crises in the Fourth Brazilian Republic, similar to those in 1954, 1955, and 1961. On the international stage, the coup was part of the Cold War in Latin America and coincided with several other military takeovers in the region.

== Terminology ==
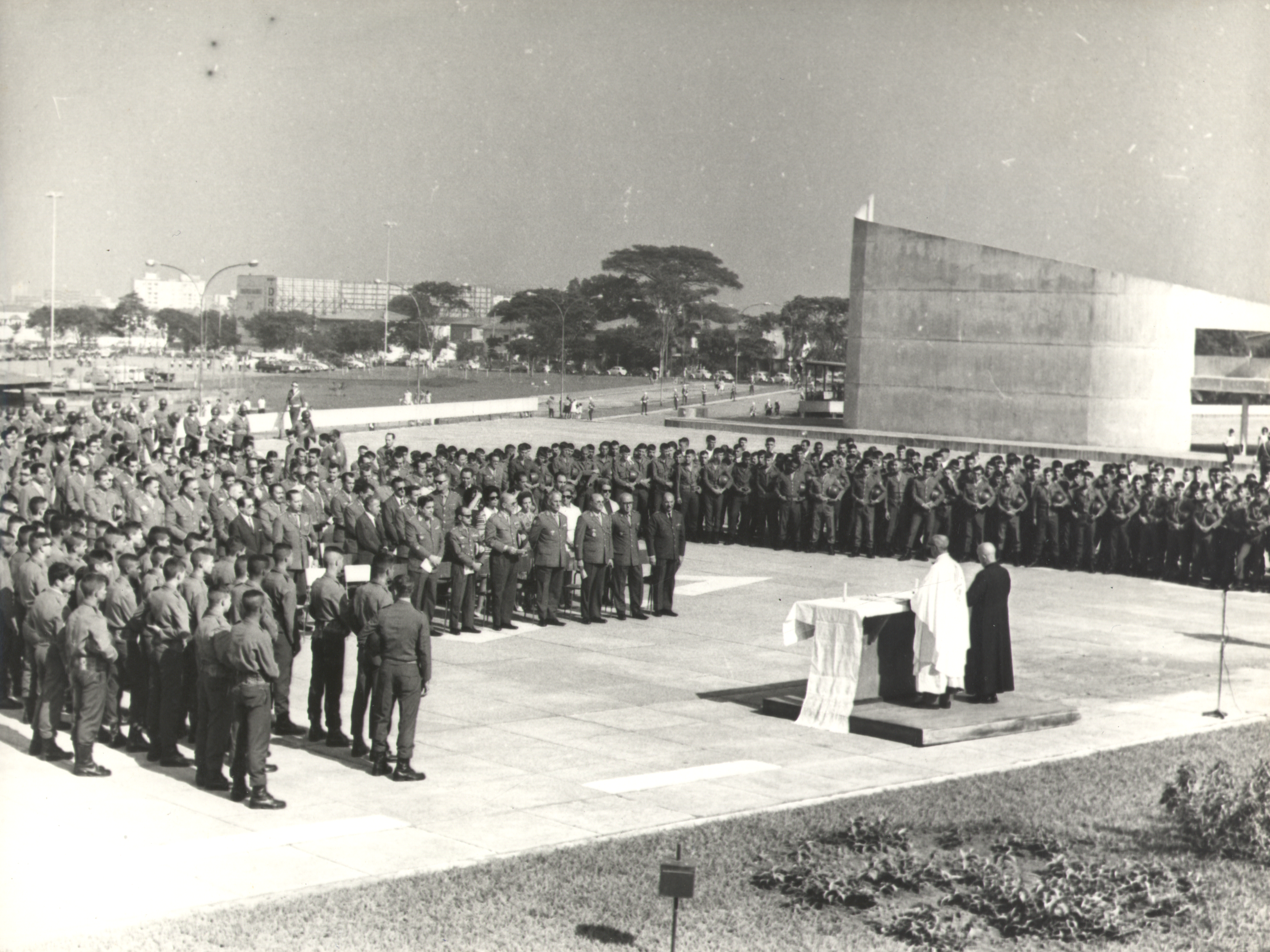
In 1970, the press records the anniversary of the "revolution" (Note: See the term used in Correio da Manhã, April 1, 1970.)

After taking office, Castelo Branco defined the process that brought him to power as "not a coup d'état, but a revolution". The term "revolution" also appears in the first Institutional Act (AI-1). This concept of revolution is more inspired by the pronunciamentos which overthrew a government and claimed to reaffirm popular sovereignty, rather than by a radical break with the established order, as in the Russian Revolution of 1917. It remained in use among the military during and after the dictatorship. However, for Ernesto Geisel, an Army officer who served as president from 1974-1979, what happened was not a revolution, because a revolution is in favor of an ideal and the 1964 movement was just "against Goulart, against corruption and against subversion". Gilberto Freyre praised what happened as "a 'white revolution', promoting political and social order".

Current historiography uses the term "coup" for the process. There was a capture of state bodies by military force, and the new owners of power were above the previous legal order. This can be seen in AI-1's preamble — "constitutional processes failed to remove the government", and the "victorious revolution defines legal norms without being limited in this by the normativity prior to its victory". The seizure of power also occurs in a revolution, but in its modern sense this is followed by "profound changes in the political, social and economic system". What happened in Brazil was defined as the defense of the established order against disorder. The term counterrevolution is used by some military officers and academics, with both positive and negative connotations. (Note: For example: Rocha 2016, pp. 35–36 and Chaves 2011, pp. 117–119.) There is also the term "countercoup". Rejection of the term "coup" to place the event in a positive light, as may take place in present political discourse, is evaluated as revisionism or negationism.

The classification of the coup as "civil-military" is widespread and is not recent. One of the first authors to use it was René Armand Dreifuss, in 1981; however, the term was used in the sense of "business-military", referring to specific civilians, and not generically to civilians as the entire non-military population. Since at least 1976, several authors have called the event a "political-military", "business-military" or "civil-military" "movement" or "coup". "Civil-military" is used because civilians not only supported, but also carried out the coup. The relative importance of the military was greater in the final stages and in the realization of the coup. It could only begin with the deployment of troops. Firepower, available armaments, vehicles employed, and troop size were important and purely military considerations, even though there was no combat.

== Background ==
=== Political ===
Jânio Quadros campaigning in the 1960 election

The democratic period that began in 1946 after the ousting of Getúlio Vargas was marked by opposition between national-statists and liberal-conservatives, divided by their attitude towards foreign investment, alignment with the United States and state intervention in the economy and labor relations. In three moments — Getúlio Vargas' suicide in 1954, Marshal Lott's counter-coup in 1955 and Jânio Quadros' resignation in 1961 — some military personnel and politicians from the liberal-conservative bloc attempted coups, creating serious crises that neared civil war, but they did not have enough support in society and in the Armed Forces. In 1964, the conflict was between the same blocs, but the coup found sufficient basis to succeed. Given previous coup attempts, what happened in 1964 was not solely a result of the immediate situation.

The three major parties were the Brazilian Labor Party (PTB), the National Democratic Union (UDN) and the Social Democratic Party (PSD). The PTB represented Vargas' labor legacy, the PSD was born out of Vargas' political machine, and the UDN came from Vargas' opposition. Increasing urbanization gradually expanded the PTB's votes. The PTB and PSD were allies for most of the period. The UDN represented the right, the PTB leaned to the left and the PSD was in the center.

The 1960 election installed Jânio Quadros as president, supported by the UDN but positioning himself above the parties, and João Goulart, from the PTB, as vice-president. Jânio and Jango were on opposing tickets, since in the electoral system at the time the president and vice-president were voted on separately. Once in power, Jânio isolated himself and, after a short time in office, he resigned in August 1961, probably in a political maneuver to have his resignation refused and to return strengthened to office. He counted on the strong rejection to his vice-president, who was on a trip to China, among the military. Jânio was popular among the military, and Jango, an old foe. In 1954, when Goulart was Vargas' Minister of Labor, he was already considered very leftist and was dismissed from office due to the "Manifesto dos coronéis".

Jânio's maneuver failed, and his resignation was accepted. But rejection to Goulart did materialize when the three military ministers, among them Odílio Denys, the Minister of War, vetoed the vice-president's return to the country and inauguration. Leonel Brizola, governor of Rio Grande do Sul, began the "Legality Campaign" to overturn the veto. He received widespread support across the country, and general José Machado Lopes, commander of the Third Army, joined the cause of constitutional succession. Both leftists and conservatives formed a coalition opposing the military ministers. Conservatives devised a solution to the crisis: Jango would take office, but under a new Parliamentary Republic, in which his powers were reduced.

The next presidential election was scheduled for 1965. The strongest pre-candidates were Juscelino Kubitschek, for the PSD, and Carlos Lacerda, governor of Guanabara and staunch oppositionist, for the UDN. The PTB's best options would be Brizola or Goulart himself, but the law did not allow re-election or the candidacy of relatives (Brizola was Jango's brother-in-law).

=== Socioeconomic ===
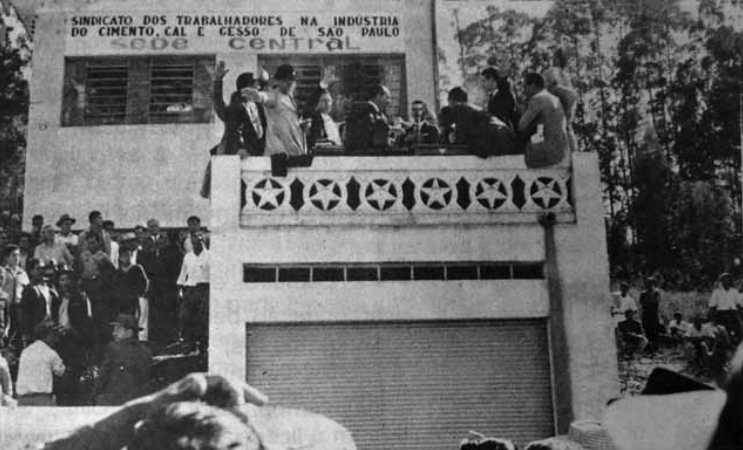
Assembly during a strike in São Paulo in 1962

Both Jânio and Jango inherited from Juscelino Kubitschek (JK) a modernizing but unbalanced economy and were unable to overcome the Brazilian economic difficulties of the early 1960s, especially the growth of inflation and the deficit in the balance of payments. Inflation rose from 30.5% in 1960 to 79.9% in 1963 and 92.1% in 1964. Brazil's GDP grew by 8.6% in 1961 and only 0.6% in 1963. Wage erosion concerned both the middle and working classes. The failure to overcome the economic crisis was due in part to pressure from domestic (workers and business) and external interest groups. Increasing costs of living boosted the organization and activity of trade unionism. There were 430 strikes in the period from 1961 to 1963, compared to only 180 from 1958 to 1960. The General Workers' Command (CGT), which emerged outside union legislation, organized the "first strikes of an explicitly political nature in Brazilian history".

According to a report by the International Food Policy Research Institute there were food shortages, pushing inflation and drawing attention to the countryside. The country was more agrarian than at present: in the 1960 census, only 44.67% of the population lived in cities. In Brazil's Southeast, this figure reached 57%, and in the Northeast, only 33.89%. The land had highly concentrated ownership and was worked with outdated technologies. Social mobilization also reached the countryside, where land invasions and violent conflicts took place. The Peasant Leagues, concentrated in the Northeast, reached their peak and radicalized, calling for "land reform by law or by force" in place of the moderate path proposed by the Brazilian Communist Party (PCB). (Note: The meaning of "land reform by law or by force" is discussed in Genaro, Eduardo Guandalini (2020). "A negociação e a violência: ambiguidades e contradições do repertório das Ligas Camponesas (1955-1964) na Paraíba e em Pernambuco" (PDF). 12º Encontro da ABCP. Archived from the original (PDF) on March 31, 2022..) They went into decline after 1963 due to the regularization of rural unionization by the government and the organization of unions by the Catholic Church and the PCB.

The period witnessed an intense popular mobilization. Unionists and members of the Leagues joined other members of the left. They were heterogeneous but united in their defense of banking, fiscal, administrative, urban, land and university reforms, collectively known as "base reforms", "in addition to extending the right to vote illiterates and enlisted ranks of the Armed Forces", legalizing the Communist Party, maintaining an Independent Foreign Policy, and achieving "control of foreign capital and a state monopoly of strategic sectors of the economy". Both the left and Goulart sought an alliance to achieve said reforms while simultaneously seeing themselves as autonomous actors. The left distrusted Goulart, heavily criticizing his efforts to conciliate with political forces to his right.

In the Armed Forces, movements of low-ranking personnel such as sergeants and sailors clashed with officers over internal demands, such as the rights to run in elections and to marry, and also advocated for reforms. There were organized intellectuals, and some Catholics formed the Popular Action. Students campaigned in the National Union of Students (UNE). The PCB was well organized and successful in the unions in cooperation with the PTB. Leonel Brizola stood out within the political class, attracted fame with the expropriation of American companies and had many followers. He unified groups in favour of the base reforms into the Popular Mobilization Front and mobilized his political base into the Grupos dos Onze.

In the opposition, an important development was the rise of the Brazilian Institute of Democratic Action (IBAD), linked to the Central Intelligence Agency (CIA), and the Institute of Research and Social Studies (IPES), which brought together the "cream of Brazilian business community". Beyond carrying out ideological propaganda, these organizations were a center of conspiracies.

=== International ===
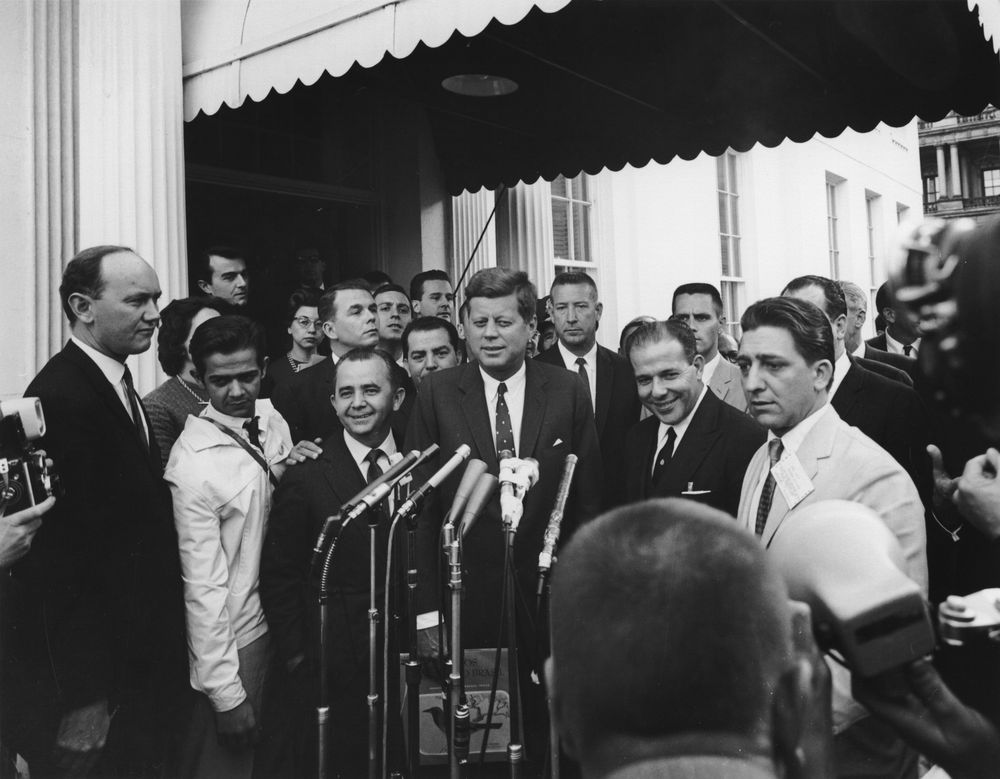
U.S. President John F. Kennedy and João Goulart speaking to the press

Latin America was in the United States' sphere of influence, but not considered very important in the 1950s. In the context of the Cold War, the U.S. government was fighting the Soviet Union's expansion of influence through the policy of containment and was under domestic pressure to display a tough foreign policy. In practice, in Latin America even reformist but non-Marxist rulers, such as Goulart, could be targets of American pressure, which occurred through economic incentives or support for coups d'état.

The Cuban Revolution, in 1959, brought Latin America to the center of attention and introduced the goal of avoiding its repetition in the rest of the region. The Cuban Missile Crisis in 1962 made the balance of forces in the region lean towards the U.S. to the detriment of the USSR, allowing a tougher attitude towards Latin American governments. A new economic assistance program, the Alliance for Progress, was supposed to prevent a new Cuba by supporting democracy and reforms (such as land reform) and overcoming underdevelopment. U.S. policy towards the region did not materialize this ideal. Military coups, such as in Argentina and Peru, in 1962, and in Guatemala and Ecuador, in 1963, were an international phenomenon, and the authoritarian governments installed were recognized by the U.S. It was through these coups that the goal of preventing new socialist and communist governments in the region was achieved.

Latin American communists were influenced by developments in the socialist bloc, such as de-Stalinization, the Sino-Soviet split and the Cuban Revolution. Communist parties under Soviet influence, such as the PCB, were in crisis, as Cuba contradicted their belief in a peaceful step towards socialism. Fidel Castro's government was allied with the Soviets at the international level but supported armed struggle as the instrument of revolution. The socialist bloc was also relevant as a hypothetical alternative to the United States as a source of credit and economic support, although it would not be able to replace the Americans in the event of a rupture. The bloc had intelligence activities on the continent, including in Brazil, through Czechoslovakia's StB, but was taken by surprise by the coup. According to socialist activist Plínio de Arruda Sampaio, Goulart had asked them asked to moderate their confrontations with the right, as he had met with the Soviet ambassador and been warned against any "less than institutional" measures, because supporting Cuba was already too expensive for the USSR, and supporting Brazil as well would be impossible.

== Goulart government ==
=== 1961–1962 ===
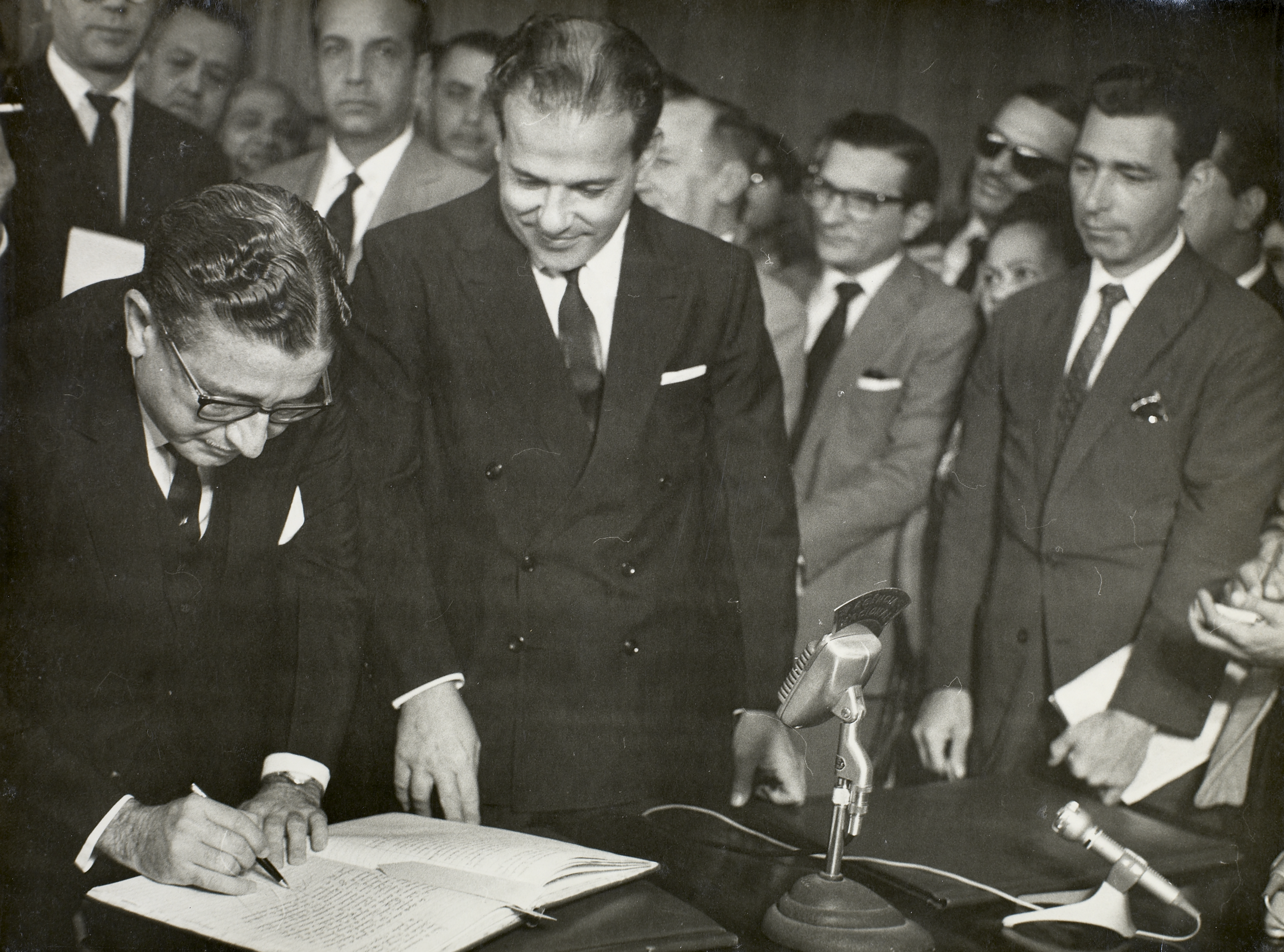
President João Goulart in 1963

Jango took office in September 1961. In foreign policy, he continued the Independent Foreign Policy, expanding relations with the socialist bloc and opposing the sanctions proposed by the U.S. against Cuba. This foreign policy did not consider an alignment towards either superpower as requirement. Even so, negotiations with the U.S. were important due to foreign debt and the regulation of foreign capital.

Internally, the priority was, from the beginning, to recover the full presidential powers subtracted by the implantation of parliamentarism. To do so, Goulart would need to pressure Congress to overthrow the parliamentary Additional Act, possibly with a constituent assembly, or bring forward the plebiscite scheduled for 1965 in which the system of government would be submitted to popular consultation. The anti-parliamentary coalition was broad, as even the president's enemies wanted a return to presidentialism. Through strong labor, military and political pressure, in September 1962 Congress brought forward the popular consultation to January 1963.

In October, elections were held for Congress and eleven state governments. Depending on the analysis, "the correlation of forces in Congress has changed little" or "the result of the polls gave victory to the leftist, reformist and labor candidates". The IBAD, supported by multinational companies, funded the campaigns of countless opposition candidates. The financing was controversial and investigated by a Parliamentary Inquiry Commission; the following year, the president closed the institute. In 1977, former American ambassador to Brazil Lincoln Gordon admitted U.S. funding of the opposition in the election.

=== 1963–1964 ===
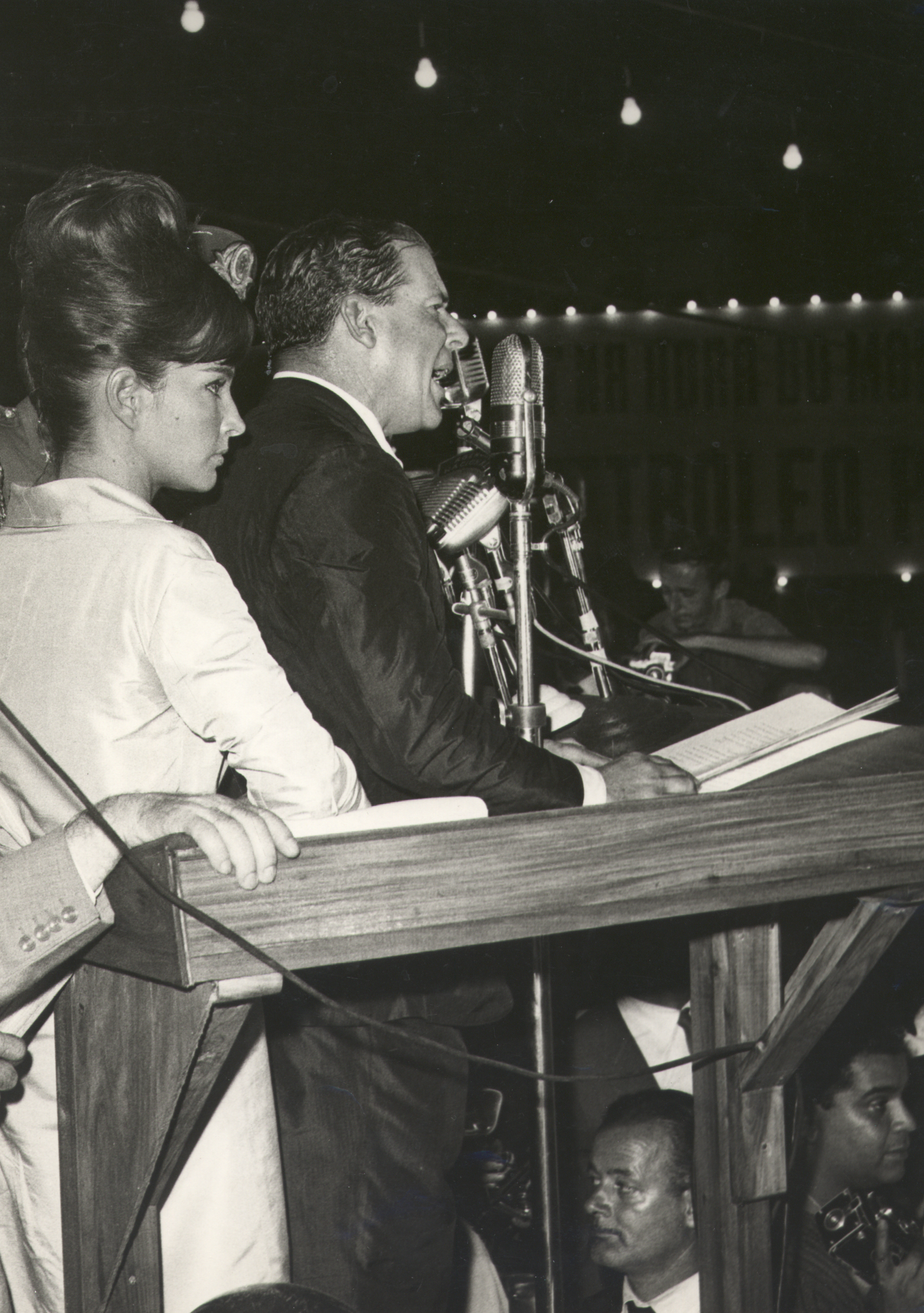
Jango at the Central Rally

Presidentialism won by a large margin in 1963 and Goulart had a "new beginning", with full powers. He intended to carry out the base reforms, but the proposed land reform was defeated in Congress and the possibility of voting on the other reforms was difficult. Friction between the Executive and Legislative branches increased as the right opposed the reforms, and the left demanded their immediate implementation. PSD support was lost throughout 1963. The percentage of bills passed dropped to 7% in 1963 from 13 to 15% in 1959–1962. Nonetheless, Goulart still managed to pass some important measures throughout his term. Meanwhile, in the economy, the Triennial Plan, proposed to face the crisis, required a social pact with workers and businessmen to limit wages, credit, prices and government spending. After a few months, the plan was abandoned for lack of political support and the crisis continued.

In September, sergeant candidates in the previous year's election had their ineligibility reaffirmed by a Supreme Federal Court (STF) decision. Navy and Air Force sergeants launched an armed revolt in Brasília but were quickly defeated, with some fighting, by the army garrison. The sergeants' movement received sympathy from the left, but politically it was badly damaged. The press became very critical of the president. The following month, Carlos Lacerda gave an interview to the Los Angeles Times and discussed the possibility of a military coup against Goulart. Military ministers were outraged. Jango requested Congress to approve a state of emergency, but he was heavily criticized by both the left and right, withdrew the request and was left with a weakened government.

At the end of 1963, after the failure of the last attempts to reconstitute a base in the center, the president reconnected with the left. At the end of February 1964, he definitely opted for a confrontational strategy, believing in the strength of the left. A rally on the Central do Brasil railway station, on the 13th, and the presidential message to Congress, on the 15th, marked the end of conciliation. A schedule of presidential rallies until May 1, which would coincide with a general strike, would pressure Congress to pass the reforms. The opposition's reaction was also confrontational. On the 15th, the governor of São Paulo, Ademar de Barros, demanded the president's impeachment and called the population to the streets; on the 20th, the opposition organized the March of the Family with God for Liberty. In the Navy, the conflict between admirals and sailors peaked, on the 25th, in the revolt of sailors who refused the order to appear at their posts until their arrested leaders were released and their demands met. The left supported the sailors, and the government granted them amnesty, drawing the indignation of officials in general and attacks in the press. The military crisis was deep, and officers refused to board ships. On the night of the 30th, the president did not back down and aggravated the crisis by attending the meeting at the Automóvel Clube with those same low-ranking military personnel.

This would be the last act of that republican period. On the 31st, general Olímpio Mourão Filho, head of the 4th Military Region/Infantry Division (4th RM/DI), began an offensive from Minas Gerais to Rio de Janeiro to overthrow the president. With the rapid progress of the revolt and Goulart's retreats, by April 4 he was in exile in Uruguay.

== The conspiracies ==
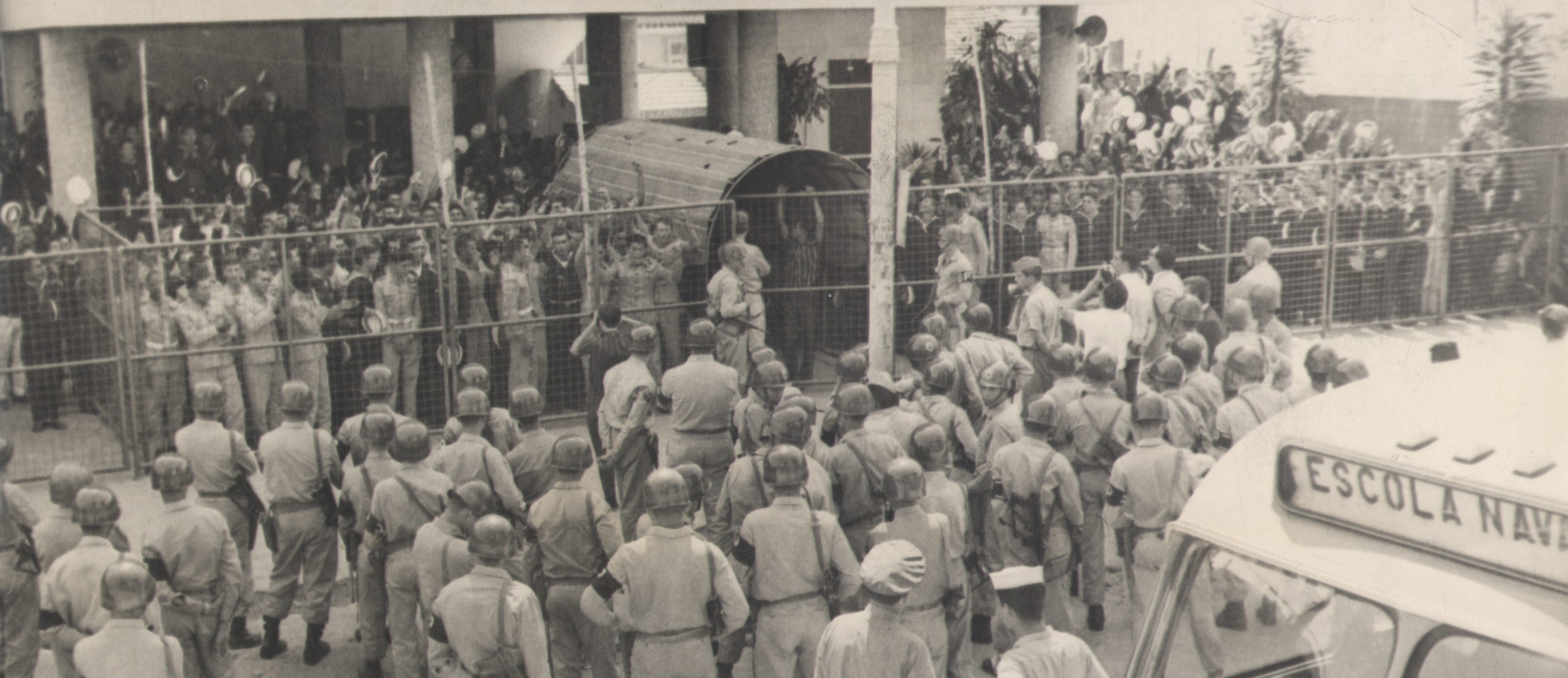
Marines confront angry sailors at the Rio de Janeiro Metalworkers Union during the Sailors' Revolt

In addition to suffering a coup attempt in his own inauguration, Goulart was the target of preparations for another coup attempt from the beginning of his term. By the end of 1961, there were already some conspiratorial groups, albeit isolated in society. The military conspiracy was decentralized and poorly organized until the eve of the coup. Civilian efforts to weaken the government, on the other hand, were better organized, and their prior destabilization was crucial to the success of the military intervention. The military conspirators ran into the "inertial legalism" of most officers who did not want to risk their careers, and on the eve of the coup the majority of the military had not taken sides.

In March 1964 the radical left denounced the coup's imminence, but it came as a great surprise. The president and his circle were aware of the conspiratorial activity, although they were unable to identify its centers. The Federal Information and Counterinformation Service (SFICI) intercepted messages from the conspirators, but little was done, as it was not directly subordinated to the president but to Argemiro de Assis Brasil, head of the Military Cabinet from 1963 to 1964, who had an overly confident attitude. The government's coup-proofing policy was known as the military apparatus, that is, naming loyal officers to key commands, in addition to expecting support from enlisted ranks.

There were efforts to distance the president from the left, and opposition funding of the 1962 elections would not make sense if the coup had already been decided. The conspiracy gained strength after the restoration of presidentialism in January 1963. (Note: Fico 2008, p. 76, considers that the coup itself was only prepared from 1963.) After the Sergeants' Revolt and the request for a state of emergency in late 1963, many officers became suspicious of the president's intentions and joined the conspiracy with a "defensive" intent. The PSD's passage to the opposition on March 10, 1964, was considered a signal by civilian and military conspirators. Throughout the month, radicalization fueled the assumption that the president was seeking a self-coup. Parliamentarians came to agree with the conspirators. In military memory, the month's events led to the accession of the undecided and formed the trigger for the coup.

== Factors, reasons and interpretations ==
=== Reaction to social movements ===
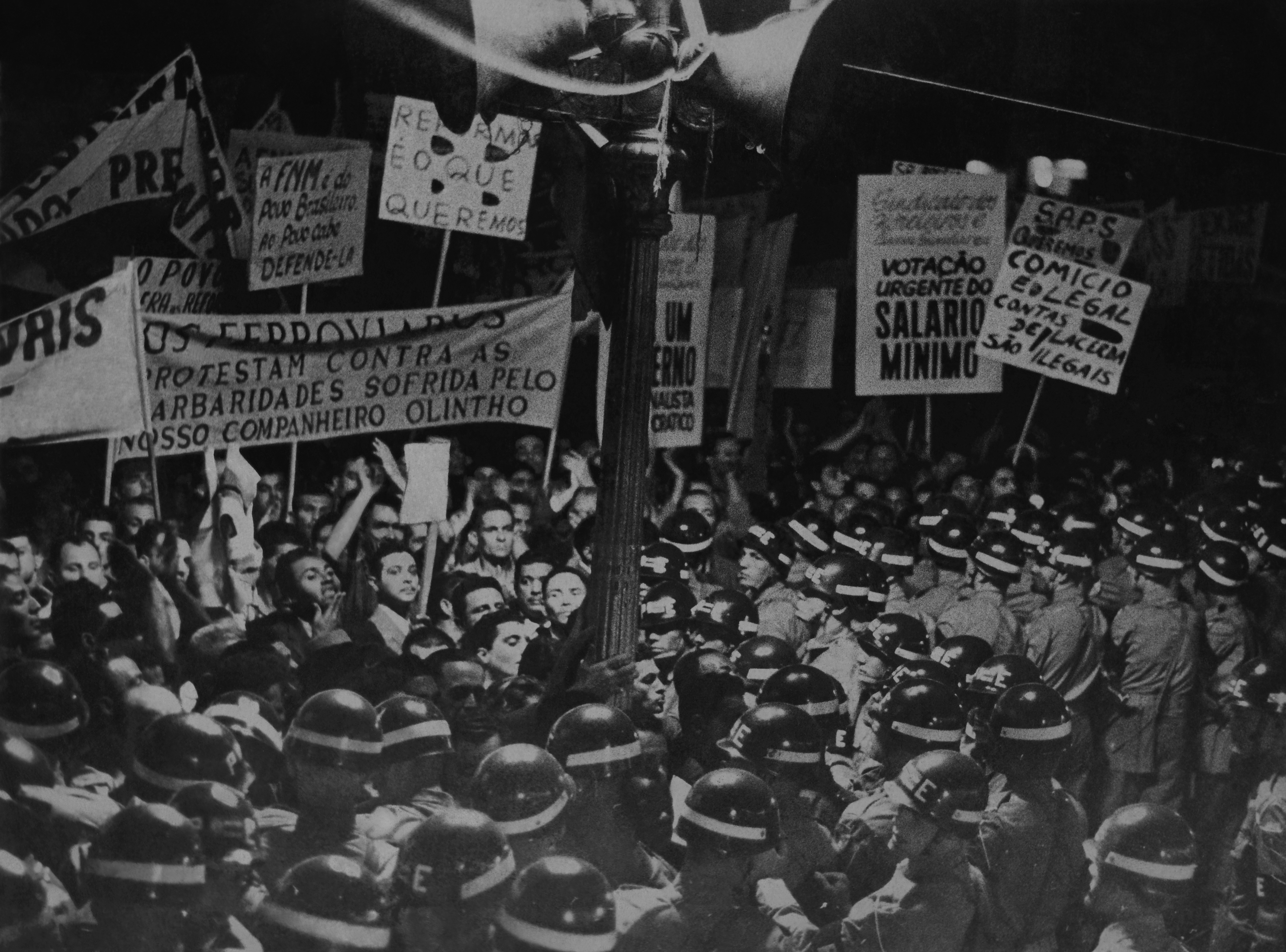
Rally in support of the president in 1963

Authors such as sociologist Florestan Fernandes and historians Caio Navarro de Toledo, Lucilia de Almeida Neves Delgado and Jacob Gorender interpreted the coup as a reactive and preventive measure against a "growing and autonomous organization of civil society". While several authors consider a victory for the left to have been impossible, Gorender concluded there was a pre-revolutionary situation in early 1964, and the coup was a counter-revolution. Octavio Ianni also described a pre-revolutionary situation, but one that could not lead to a rupture with existing institutions as in the Russian Revolution. According to authors such as Ianni and Francisco Weffort, the populism that existed since the Vargas Era collapsed as workers began to act autonomously, while businessmen linked to international capital abandoned the populist system.

The constant strikes "are interpreted as positive signs of the advance of workers' political awareness", but they also wore down the government, bothered the population during the suspension of services and alarmed businessmen. The right affirmed the imminence of a "syndicalist republic". Military testimonies emphasize the action of the unions, considering them as infiltrated by the communists and increasingly capable of putting pressure on the government. For Edmundo Campos Coelho, this reflected the fear of losing their own influence over the government, in addition to an organic conception of society, in which the gains of a specific group harm society in general. Communists did have influence in important trade unions, and Goulart was tolerant towards unionists, allowed the rise of PTB and PCB in the unions and used them as a political tool. However, he was harmed by them when their pressure made the Triennial Plan unfeasible. The president tried to regain control and weaken the same unionists he had previously supported, but without success, and at the end of his government he tried to rebuild labor support.

In the Armed Forces, the political mobilization of enlisted personnel was rejected by officers as an attack on military hierarchy and discipline, even though officers were politically engaged. In 1963, sub-lieutenant Gelcy Rodrigues Côrrea's speech — "we will take our work tools and make the reforms together with the people, and may the reactionary gentlemen remember that the soldier's work tool is the rifle" — caused a serious crisis among officers. Leftists envisioned the lower ranks fighting on their defense, even though this section of the military had not sufficiently organized itself to play this role. Furthermore, the president sought the support of enlisted ranks, and his tolerant attitude towards the Sailors Revolt and speech at the Automóvel Clube gave the impression that he "spurred the crisis". For conservatives, the military was being subverted. Military testimonies list attacks on hierarchy and discipline as one of the main motivations for the coup.

Historiography agrees that there were disciplinary problems in the lower ranks of the Armed Forces in the 1960s, although specifically in the Army (and not in the Navy or Air Force) the evidence indicates that sergeants remained loyal. Many authors and a large part of the left consider the Sailors Revolt, in particular, as the work of agents provocateurs of the Navy or the CIA. More recent ones challenge both these accusations and the conservative view that military underlings were being subverted; instead, they are considered autonomous agents. (Note: See Faria 2013, pp. 461–462, Silva 2014c, p. 155, Almeida, Anderson da Silva (2010). Todo o leme a bombordo – marinheiros e ditadura civil-militar no Brasil: da rebelião de 1964 à Anistia (PDF) (Thesis). Niterói: UFF. and Rodrigues, Flávio Luís (2017). Marinheiros contra a ditadura brasileira: AMFNB, prisão, guerrilha-nacionalismo e revolução? (PDF) (Thesis). São Paulo: USP.. The main target of the accusations is José Anselmo dos Santos, the Cabo Anselmo.)

=== Stalemate in the base reforms ===
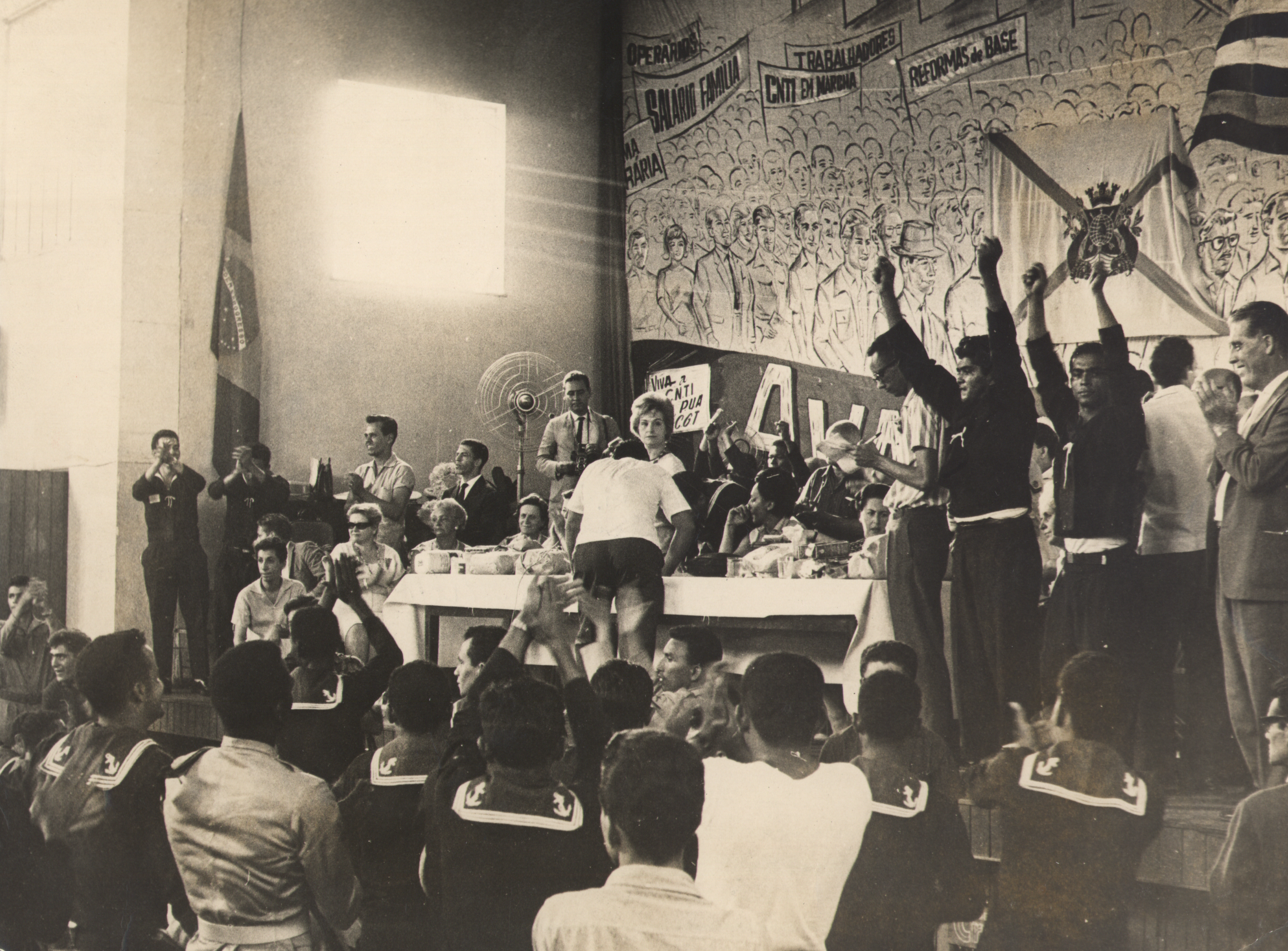
Base reforms on posters during the Sailors' Revolt

During the coup, Goulart told Tancredo Neves that the target was not him, but the reforms, and he could stay if he abandoned them. Several authors agree that the objective was to prevent the reforms, as they benefited and harmed certain sectors of society, were associated with the radical left and even branded as revolutionary proposals, although they were part of a national-developmentalist project of capitalist progress.

A contrary view does not consider the reforms as the central motive, as they were not entirely rejected and Goulart even had support among conservatives at the beginning of his term. Some authors consider that there was room for negotiation throughout the term. Opposition parliamentarians were not categorically opposed to the reforms. Landowners and other groups strongly rejected the proposals, but some anti-communist sectors considered them an instrument to ward off communism, and this was precisely a precept of the Alliance for Progress. Land reform was not a taboo, and even the IBAD held a symposium on it in 1961.

The failure of the proposals is attributed to Goulart's lack of negotiation skills (an existing and also contested assessment), or, among authors with conjunctural explanations of the coup, to the "decision-making paralysis" of the political system, as described by Wanderley Guilherme dos Santos, and the radicalization and mutual disrespect for democracy, according to Jorge Ferreira and Argelina Figueiredo. For Figueiredo, author of Democracia ou reformas? Alternativas democráticas à crise política: 1961-1964 (1993), possibilities to carry out reforms within the institutions were impeded by radicalism on both sides, and thus, the coup's losers were partly responsible for their own defeat. Argelina is criticized for taking "the focus of her explanation away from the civil and military right, IPES, the U.S. Embassy, etc." and for her understanding of an undemocratic left. For Moniz Bandeira, Jango fell precisely because he tried to conciliate.

=== Anti-communism ===
==== Goulart and the communists ====
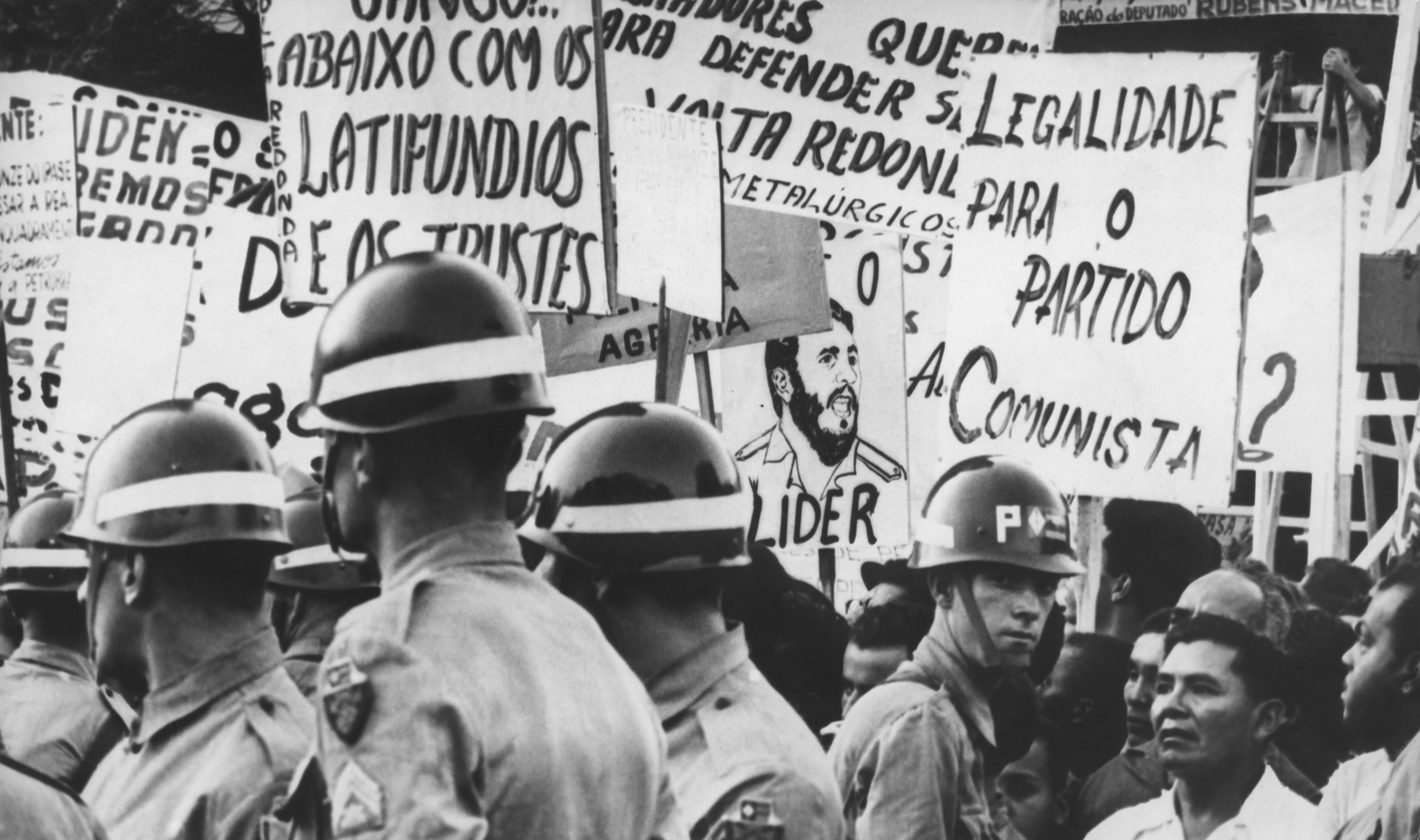
Posters at the Central Rally

Anti-communism is considered a fundamental element of the coup both in studies and among the military. The 1961-1964 period was a high point of anti-communist sentiment in Brazil. It was associated with the Cold War and Brazilian anti-communists who were mostly pro-American and considered communism as the work of Soviet imperialism. However, the sentiment had local roots since the 1930s, when the Communist Uprising took place.

The problem would not be Goulart as a person, but the pressure he would receive from the communists. Jango was responsible for transforming the PTB from a dam holding back communism to an ally of the PCB, and the attempt to prevent his inauguration in 1961 already had anti-communist motivation. Anti-communists did not believe Goulart was a Marxist but feared that his alliance would pave the way for the Communists to advance. Testimonies in the Oral History of the Army are unanimous in claiming that communists were infiltrated in the government, but not in associating Jango with communism. Olímpio Mourão Filho thought that Goulart was not a communist, but he and Brizola would be killed by the communists and Luís Carlos Prestes would take power. The distinction continues to be made in some military writings in the 21st century. A similar opinion outside the military is that of Lincoln Gordon, for whom Goulart would stage a non-communist coup but then, due to his incompetence, fall victim to a communist coup.

The PCB had influence in organized labor, the intelligentsia and the government, but it was exaggerated by its enemies, and after the coup, there was surprise at the fragility of the communists. Well-informed anti-communists were thinking of a presidential coup with communist support but spoke to the population of an imminent communist revolution. They also used the communist label for the entire radical left—the military right had an elastic definition of who was a communist. Smaller groups in the left, and not the PCB, were the advocates of an immediate socialist revolution. (Note: Such as the Communist Party of Brazil, Política Operária and the Trotskyist Revolutionary Workers Party (Ferreira 2004, p. 188).) The PCB believed in several phases of revolution, of which the first would be peaceful, bourgeois-democratic and in alliance with the "national bourgeoisie". The military saw this through the lens of its Revolutionary War Doctrine, taking pacifism for deception and a tactic of psychological manipulation, which would be the first stage in the communist seizure of power.

==== Revolutionary War Doctrine ====
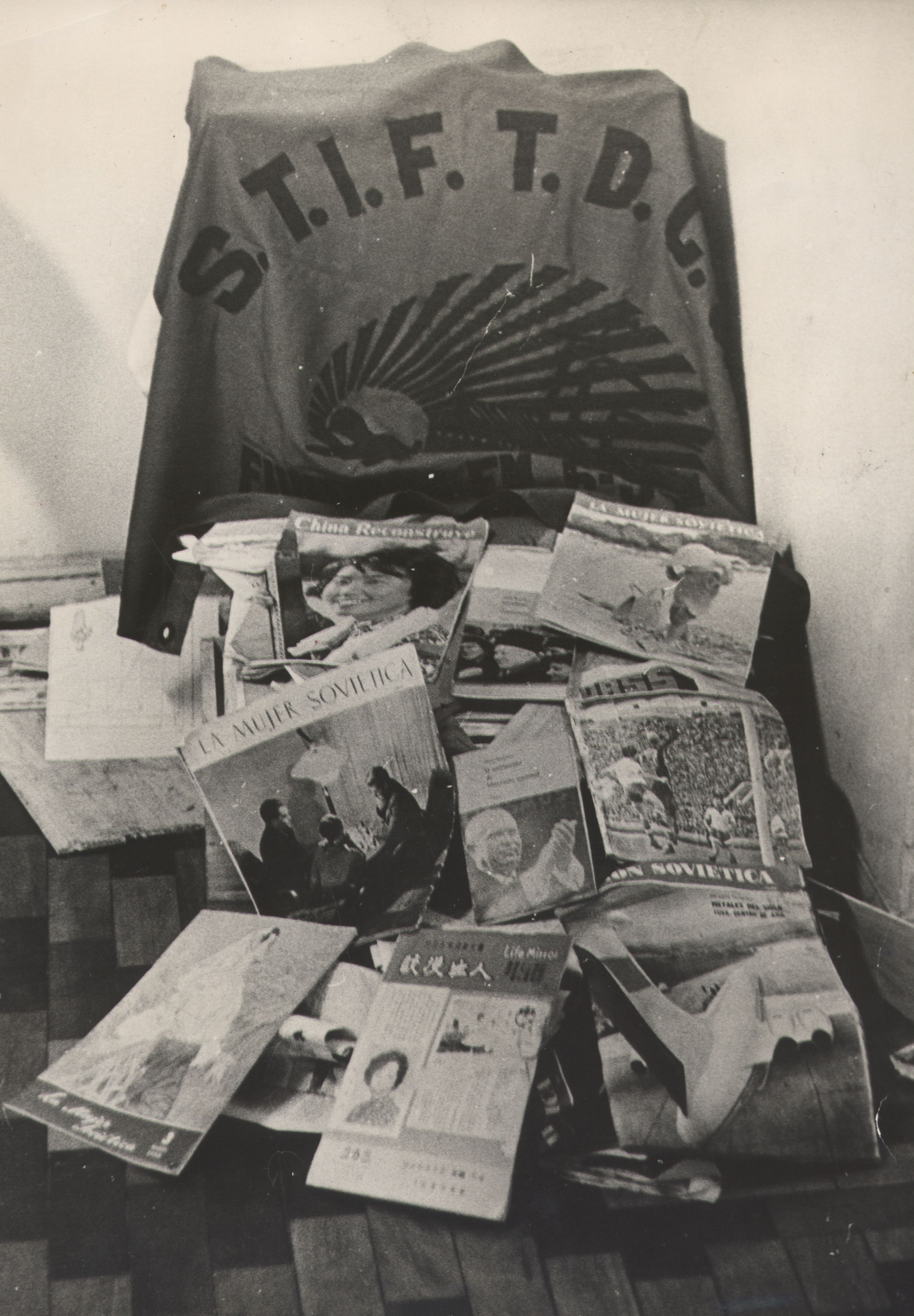
Seized "subversive material" in April 1964

The Revolutionary War Doctrine was taught to officers and disseminated by civilians, such as the UDN deputy Bilac Pinto and the newspaper O Estado de São Paulo, by Júlio de Mesquita Filho. It envisaged five stages of communist advancement. After psychological action in the first, the second would be the formation of a network of local organizations and the infiltration of the state apparatus. Ongoing social unrest was seen as proof of this step. The first two, although bloodless, were considered the most critical and difficult to fight. The third stage would consist of guerrilla warfare and terrorism, followed by liberated zones beyond the Army's reach on the fourth, and in the fifth, the violent seizure of power by a revolutionary army. According to the Doctrine's theorists, claims by enlisted personnel that they'd react with their weapons against a coup and the organization of Peasant Leagues and Grupos dos Onze constituted the third stage of the revolutionary war in Brazil.

In the countryside, the Peasant Leagues attracted fears. The right saw revolutionary potential in the Brazilian countryman, which served to justify the coup as a defense of legality. Part of the left thought the same, and some members of the Leagues even formed a guerrilla movement, the Tiradentes Revolutionary Movement. The organization received support from Cuba. Its discovery and dismantling in 1962 brought repercussion disproportionate to its size. However, the strong reaction that the coup leaders expected in the Northeast did not materialize. In Pernambuco, the outbreaks of peasant reaction that did appear were unarmed. (Note: DOPS recorded that the revolt of the Peasant Leagues in Vitória de Santo Antão was armed with scythes, hoes and sticks. In Palmares, the peasants expected weaponry from the state government, but it was not provided. Santos, Thayana de Oliveira (2015). ""Quase sem dar um tiro"?: a resistência ao Golpe de 1964 em Pernambuco". Convergência Crítica. 6 (1): 31–41..)

The Grupos dos Onze were associated with communism and revolutionary warfare, generating fear among conservatives. They existed by the thousands and were formed as the future "embryo of a revolutionary party", with the function of resisting a coup. According to Brizola, their function would be legalistic, and they had no paramilitary character. According to one of his aides, there were plans to use them under the command of sergeants, participating in the occupation of barracks and arrest of officers. However, they did not react during the coup, as they still had no concrete organization. The press had published many actions attributed to them, but they were mostly imagined.

=== Legality and democracy ===
==== As a part of rhetoric ====
Neither side of the political spectrum declared itself anti-democratic, but the conceptions of democracy were different: for the left, it was synonymous with reforms, and for the right, with legal formalism. An anti-democratic character of the left is a controversial thesis. Among the right, democracy could be associated with the restriction of freedoms to fight dangerous ideologies or just mean free enterprise. The word was common in the name of anti-communist groups, where it could just be an empty label, although for many the authoritarian future that ensued was a disappointment.

Coup-mongers took for themselves the banner of legality, using defensive language as they conducted their offensive. The defense of legality and the Constitution, not explicitly directed against the government, appeared in March 1964 in speeches at the PSD convention. The Brazilian Bar Association accused the president of threatening the legal order. In the military, legal justifications for the use of force circulated in documents from 1963 onwards, such as the reserved circular released by Castelo Branco on March 20, 1964. Castelo cultivated an image of a loyalist, which helped to obtain defections. The Constitution and the Constitutionalist Revolution were strong themes at the March of the Family in São Paulo. Newspaper editorials during the coup presented the government as the one breaching legality. Congressmen justified removing the president as a way of defending the democratic regime.

This legality could be "linked to a moral, traditional and Christian law" or even to "a revolutionary legality linked to the popular will". From this respective, illegality would be the CGT's actions, the breakdown of hierarchy in the Armed Forces, the generalized chaos and disorder, the approval of base reforms by unconstitutional means and the president's intentions to prolong his rule and attempt a self-coup.

==== Accusations of caudillism ====
There were accusations of caudillism, distinct from anti-communism but aggravated by it. Goulart was considered a potential or present caudilho by Carlos Lacerda, by several newspapers, pointing to opportunism, paternalism and dictatorial tendencies, and by Afonso Arinos, for whom the president practiced both caudillism, which he inherited from Vargas, and Bonapartism, by pitting the people against the institutions. Lincoln Gordon believed in a Janguist dictatorship with a nationalist character, along the lines of Vargas and Juan Perón. Some officers also feared the transformation of the Armed Forces into government militias.

Two moments opened the president to suspicions of coupist intent. In 1962, alongside other pressures on Congress, the commander of the Third Army declared himself incapable of maintaining order if lawmakers did not bring forward the plebiscite on parliamentarism. The following year, during the request for a state of emergency, troops took to the streets in Recife and an operation by paratroopers against Carlos Lacerda was denounced. It was thus suspected that Goulart would intervene against the rightist governor of Guanabara and the leftist governor of Pernambuco, Miguel Arraes. At that moment, the left also denounced a coup by the president. In March 1964, the president's proposals were received with great suspicion: the right to vote for the illiterate, a plebiscite for reforms, the delegation of legislative powers to the Executive and a revision of the electoral law which would open a loophole for competition from blood relatives and the like, such as Brizola (the president's brother-in-law), and would even allow re-election.

Some authors also discern coupist intentions in Jango's actions, such as Marco Antonio Villa and Leandro Konder, for whom a coup d'état may be seen between the tight deadlines and lack of consensus in the re-election proposal. However, in 1962, 1963 and 1964 there is no firm empirical evidence of Goulart's coup intentions. There is also evidence that in 1962 he refused proposals to close Congress by Brizola and general Amaury Kruel, then head of the Military Cabinet. Moniz Bandeira said to have heard from Jango himself that Brizola proposed a coup d'état on several occasions, but he refused. Lincoln Gordon claimed in 1966 to have "far more solid evidence than accusations in the anti-government Brazilian press" of dictatorial intentions, but in 2005 he said he had no more evidence for this than the rumors in the press.

=== Public opinion ===
==== In demonstrations and press ====
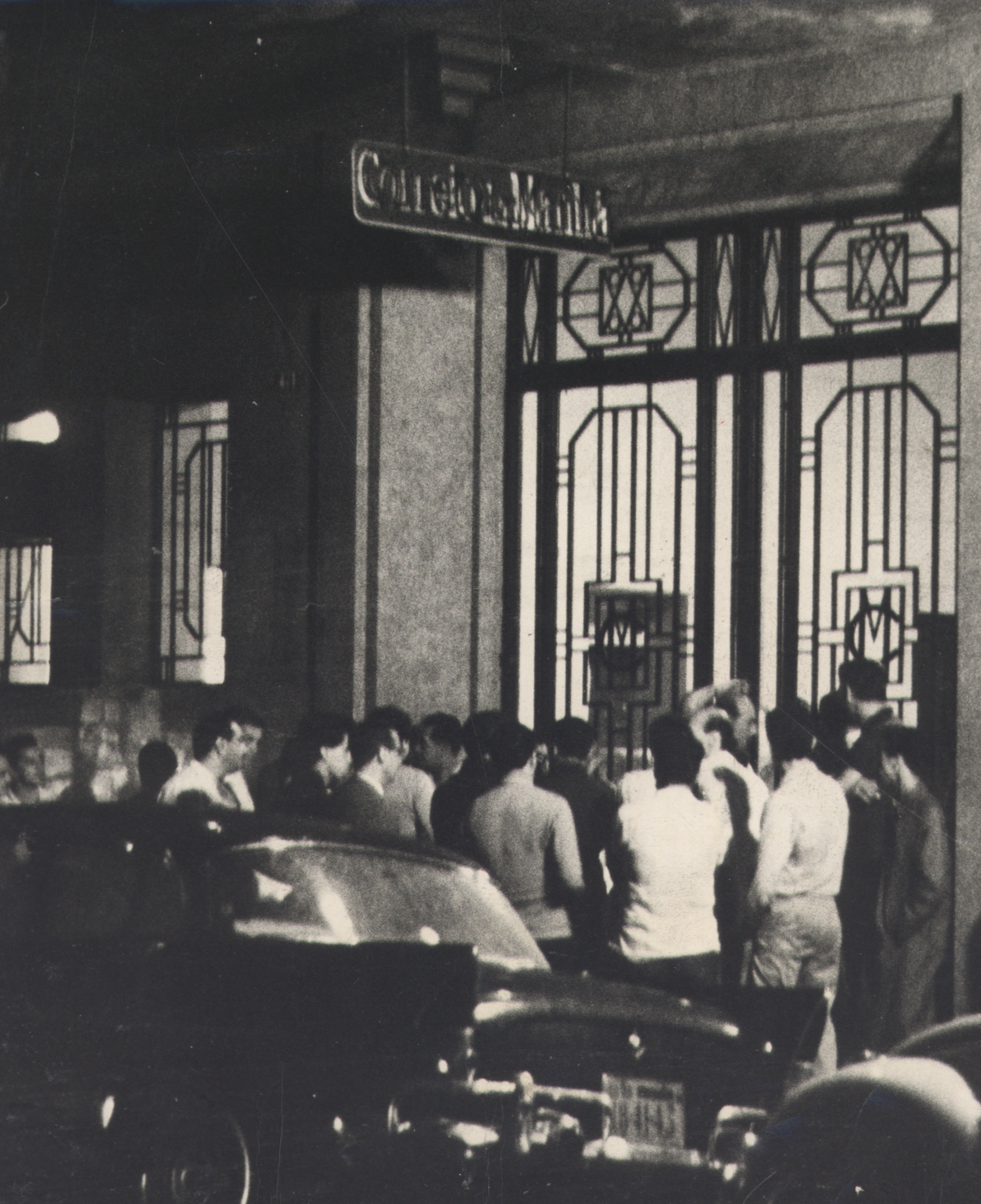
Agglomeration at Correio da Manhã awaits the release of the extra edition on the coup

Conspirators took public opinion into account when deciding to launch the coup. In military memory, the March of the Family, the middle class, women and the press demanded and legitimized an intervention. The Marches, a phenomenon that started in São Paulo and multiplied to many other Brazilian cities, demonstrated a mobilized and socially heterogeneous opposition. This social base represented a part and not the whole of society.

The opposition front included "bankers, businessmen, industrialists, landowners, merchants, politicians, judges and the middle class" — especially the urban middle class of liberal professionals, small businessmen and housewives. The middle class predominated, but blue-collar workers also attended. IPES participated in organizing the March in order to mobilize the middle class to its ends. However, it was not passively used as an instrument and had its own motives, fearing what it could lose in a radical redistribution. Furthermore, some anti-government activities followed a decentralized logic as the work of local groups with distinct demands.

The marches expressed an anti-populist (against "demagogy, disorder and corruption") and anti-communist (against atheism and totalitarianism) ideology, rallying against perceived threats to individual freedoms and Christian values. Employers' unions, civil and class organizations, and women's organizations such as the Women's Campaign for Democracy committed themselves. Female presence was important in the organization of events and in the evocation of family and religion. Anticommunism could have a religious character, predominantly Catholic but ecumenical, as it also existed among Protestants, Jews, spiritualists and even Umbanda practitioners. Priests (like Patrick Peyton), pastors and rabbis participated in the marches. However, the Catholic Church was divided; conservatives were probably in the majority. In Brazilian Protestantism, the most visible participation was that of the Presbyterian Church, but the coup was also accepted in Baptist, Methodist, Assemblies of God and other publications.

The mainstream press paved the way for the president's deposition, called for it in editorials and celebrated its occurrence. Jornal do Brasil, Correio da Manhã, O Globo, Folha de S. Paulo and O Estado de S. Paulo openly defended Goulart's deposition, most famously with the Correio's "Fora!" and "Basta!" editorials. Estado de S. Paulo, O Globo and Tribuna da Imprensa were in the conspiracy. Among important newspapers, Última Hora was the only one that did not side with the coup. Its newsroom was vandalized during the coup, the opposite of 1954, when, after Vargas' suicide, O Globo and Tribuna da Imprensa had their newsrooms attacked. The smaller O Semanário did not join either.

==== Opinion polls ====
IBOPE polls at the time reveal a public with a good image of Goulart, eager for reforms and anti-communist without associating communism with the reforms or Goulart. In March 1964, in the city of São Paulo, the government was evaluated by 42% as excellent or good and 30% as fair, and 79% considered the base reforms necessary, either urgently or moderately. This support was focused on reforms for specific sectors, and not so much those with a general effect: in the capitals the average support for land reform was 70%, with support even from the middle and upper classes, and voting rights for enlisted military ranks was also accepted, but voting rights for the illiterate were rejected. In the 1965 election, 19% preferred candidates from the left (Miguel Arraes and Leonel Brizola), 45% from the center (Magalhães Pinto and JK) and 23% from the right (Carlos Lacerda and Ademar de Barros). 48.9% would vote for Jango if he could run for re-election. When presented with fewer candidates, there were 37% of voting intentions for JK and 25% for Lacerda.

As for communism, in São Paulo in February, 44% considered it a growing danger; in March, 68% considered it a danger and 80% were against legalizing the Communist Party. In 1963, 63% of Rio de Janeiro's residents agreed with the prohibition of the Congress of Solidarity with Cuba. However, in March 1964, only 16% of São Paulo's citizens considered the measures proposed by the president as a path to communism, and 10% as demagoguery.

In the polls after the coup there is a change of opinion about Goulart, with 54% of São Paulo's citizens in May considering his overthrow beneficial. 55% agreed with coupist views that he would close Congress or lead Brazil to communism. In Guanabara there was support for the purges and rejection of amnesty. However, in São Paulo and Guanabara respondents wanted direct elections and a succession to a civilian government, and in 1965 there was high dissatisfaction with the Castelo Branco government and especially the economy.

=== U.S. influence ===
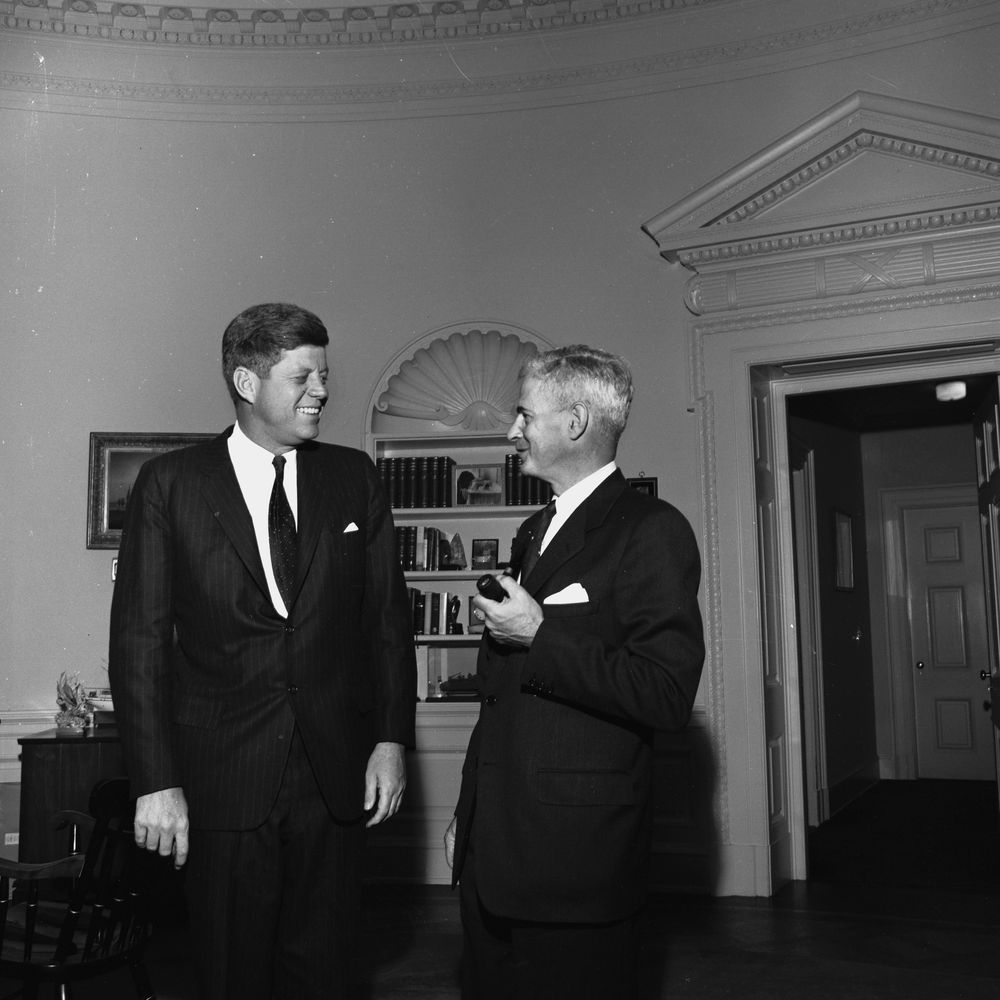
Kennedy and U.S. Ambassador to Brazil Lincoln Gordon

Since his inauguration, Goulart had been the target of suspicion in the White House due to his past connections in organized labor. However, the deterioration of bilateral relations was gradual. The factors were many, such as the Profit Remittance Act directed at foreign companies, disagreements over Cuba, a threat to break with the U.S. and seek Soviet credit in 1962, Lincoln Gordon's interpretation that Goulart would stage a coup, the failure of stabilization by the Triennial Plan, the expropriations of American companies by Brizola and economic reasons. In Washington there was also concern about the Peasant Leagues and Cuban support for the guerrillas discovered in 1962. Lincoln Gordon feared a "major disaster" "which might make Brazil the China of the 1960s".

A 2018 literature review defined the American role in Goulart's term as one of increasing the chances of a rebellion occurring and succeeding, but found the dynamics of the crisis were still fundamentally Brazilian. A Brazilian crisis with American influence weighing in favor of the opposition is the opinion of several historians. On the other hand, in the 1960s and 1970s Marxist scholars placed a lot of emphasis on the American factor. At a given moment, the U.S. decided to favor Goulart's deposition, but the chronology and reasons are controversial. The moment can be situated from 1962 to the end of 1963, and the attitudes at the beginning of the term, as ways of putting pressure, not overthrowing, the Brazilian president.

In addition to financing candidates in the 1962 elections and directing resources to opposition governors, the negotiation of American credits, crucial for the Brazilian economy and easily granted to Jânio, was difficult for Jango, as the credits were conditioned to economic stabilization and distancing of the radical left in the trade unions. In a telegram of March 28, 1964, Gordon mentioned how "secret operations of pro-democracy street demonstrations ... and encouragement [of] democratic and anti-Communist sentiment in Congress, the Armed Forces, student groups and pro-American workers, church, and business" were ongoing in Brazil. (Note: «187. Telegram From the Ambassador to Brazil (Gordon) to the Department of State». history.state.gov. Rio de Janeiro, March 28, 1964.)

Also in July 1962, ambassador Gordon favorably discussed with John F. Kennedy the possibility of a military coup in Brazil. The CIA had been monitoring military conspiracies for over two years before the coup and in 1963 looked for a military group to back. The December 1963 contingency plan mentions secret contacts with the Brazilian conspirators and, out of four hypotheses, it has two improbable ones, one similar to what actually happened (the removal of Goulart and takeover by Ranieri Mazzilli, president of the Chamber of Deputies) and one with a conflict in Brazil. In the event of a conflict, logistical support would be provided to the opposition, but not before the formation of an alternative provisional government and international recognition of a state of belligerence. Afonso Arinos later already confessed to having been appointed by Magalhães Pinto, governor of Minas Gerais, to seek recognition of a state of belligerence abroad.

President Lyndon B. Johnson was briefed on the ongoing coup in 1964 and greenlit measures "to take every step" to support the opposition if needed. The American logistical operation had one of Castelo Branco's trusted men, General José Pinheiro de Ulhoa Cintra, as an intermediary in Brazil. During the coup, it was Castelo Branco who informed the Americans that logistical support was not necessary, and so the operation was deactivated. (Note: Departamento de Estado, 1 de abril de 1964: "Castello Branco states no need US logistical support.") Codenamed "Brother Sam", the operation launched during the coup consisted of loading oil tankers in the Caribbean and munitions at air bases and sending a naval task force led by the aircraft carrier USS Forrestal, docked in Virginia. The ships would arrive at the Brazilian coast from April 10, but with the cancellation, they returned to their ports. (Note: Operation documents with all ships involved, fuel loads and expected schedules are reproduced in Portuguese at Corrêa 1977.) No troop landing would take place, although a land operation had been discussed years earlier in Washington. Although its role was to deliver fuel and ammunition for the opposition, the naval task force would also ultimately have an intimidating effect.

=== IPES project ===
A classic Marxist analysis of the coup is Dreifuss's 1964: A Conquista do Estado (1981). The book focuses on the entrepreneurs linked to international capital who emerged in the 1950s and, during Goulart's government, concluded that in order to materialize their interests it would be necessary to "conquer the State". They had a state project — "to restrict the organization of the working classes; to consolidate economic growth in a model of late capitalism, dependent, with a high degree of industrial concentration integrated to the banking system and to promote the development of multinational and associated interests in the formation of a techno-entrepreneurial regime". To accomplish this, IPES and IBAD worked to destabilize the president. Their activities are well documented. After the coup, Ipesians such as Delfim Neto, Roberto Campos and Otávio Gouveia de Bulhões reached strategic positions in the state apparatus and conducted their economic reforms, while Golbery do Couto e Silva, also an Ipesian, created the National Information Service.

This interpretation is criticized for diminishing the importance of the military in the coup and ignoring its statist tradition, which was later implanted in the dictatorship, contradicting the economic liberalism of IPES and thus the success of its project. Against this, it is argued, the state's role in the economy was recognized as part of the project. Attention has also been drawn to the failure of many of IPES' efforts, which Dreifuss acknowledged, but this failure may have been precisely the reason for the coup. Military writings treat the coup as the work of a military conspiracy supported by economic groups and not the other way around, as appears in the political-sociological literature. For Carlos Fico, the book does not distinguish between destabilization and conspiracy against the Goulart government. Destabilization, like IPES propaganda, had a more civil character and would not necessarily lead to the overthrow of the government, and could, for example, only change the game in elections.

The conspiracy of the "IPES/IBAD complex" and the Superior School of War (ESG), the "Sorbonne", included generals Castelo Branco, Golbery do Couto e Silva, Antônio Carlos Muricy and Osvaldo Cordeiro de Farias, known as the "modernizers". Their movement wasn't the only one; Dreifuss also identified "right-wing extremists" and "traditionalists". The former, also known as the hard-liners, were especially linked to São Paulo businessmen and included Air Force brigadier João Paulo Moreira Burnier. The latter represented the less dynamic elites, party groups, governors and officers without ESG training, such as Artur da Costa e Silva, Olímpio Mourão Filho, Amaury Kruel and Joaquim Justino Alves Bastos. They did not have the state project of the "modernizers" and were opposed to the government for more reactive reasons. The "traditionalists" had more military commands and therefore initiated the coup, but power passed to the "modernizers" due to their stronger social base.

=== Changes in military thinking ===
The ESG developed the National Security Doctrine (DSN), considered the "doctrinal and ideological content for conquest and maintenance of power from 1964". Centered on security and development, "it aimed to subject all national activities to a security policy, destined to reject communism and transform Brazil into a capitalist power". Influenced by, but not imported from, the United States, it conceived an alliance with strong states, total war in which national defense would involve the entire population, and a fight against an internal enemy. The ESG wanted to build competent civilian and military elites to lead society through the demands of total war.

However, although the ESG was an important think tank and a point of contact between civilians and the military, in the early 1960s its theoretical body was not systematically disseminated among the officer corps. The most widespread theoretical innovation was the French-influenced Revolutionary War Doctrine, which was distinct from the DSN, although the latter assimilated its concepts. It allowed a dramatic reading of the situation and the conclusion that liberal democracy, civil rights and even the Geneva Conventions would be incapable of overcoming it.

According to the American political scientist Alfred Stepan, author of The Military in Politics: Changing Patterns in Brazil (1971), another development was the perceived decadence and ineffectiveness of the political system. Coupled with the officers' feeling that they were empowered by the DSN, this allowed them to retain power in their hands after the coup, breaking their pattern of a moderating power, which would overthrow civil governments and install new ones. This idea of a moderating pattern is similar to that defended by Robert W. Dean, adviser to the section of the U.S. embassy in Brasília, back in 1964. Stepan's theses, especially the moderating power, are well known and have already been criticized by other authors.

== Geography of operations ==
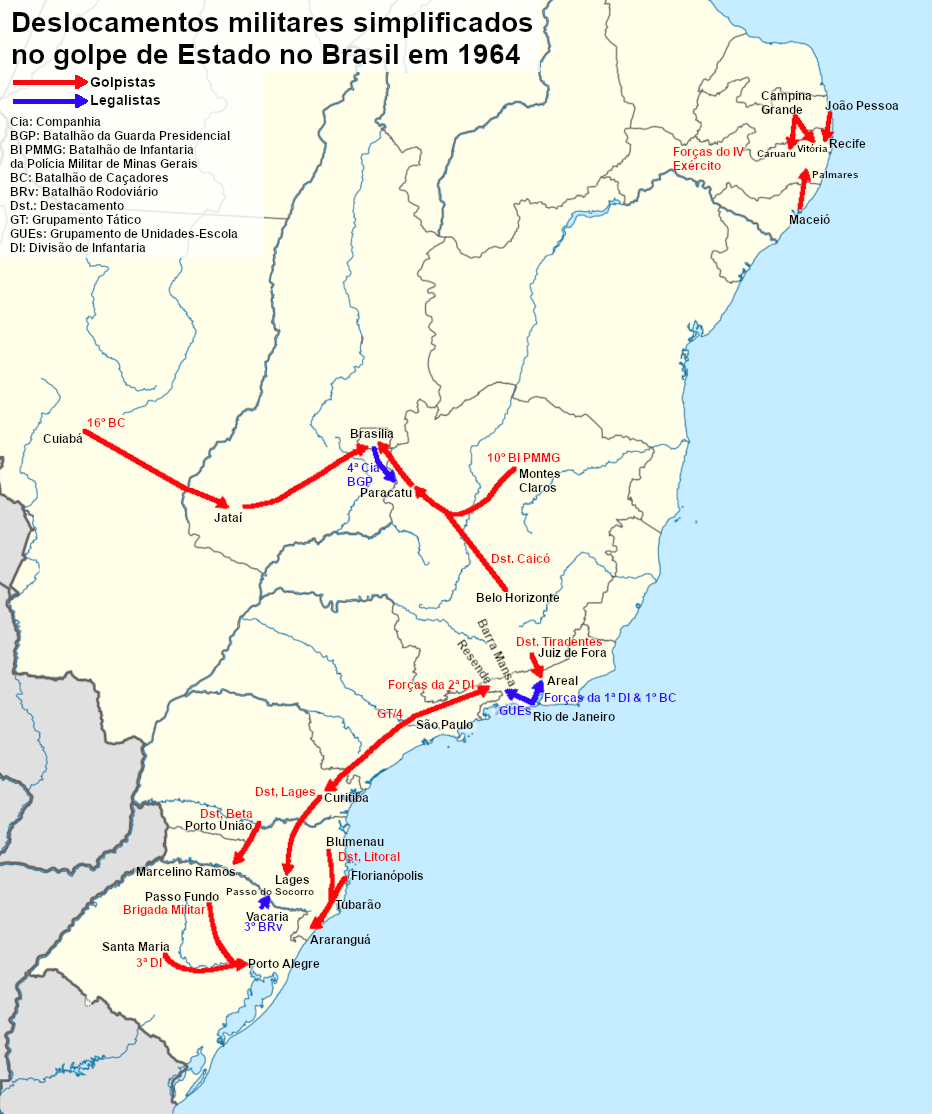
Military deployments during the coup

The main objective of the coup leaders was Rio de Janeiro. Although Brasília was the new capital, "Rio continued to be the political capital and, in fact, the great sounding board for all important national events". (Note: "The state progressively becomes the main focus of opposition to the Goulart government, which, in turn, will treat Guanabara as a threat to be neutralized. The confrontation, sometimes even physical, between government supporters and oppositionists, takes place not in isolated Brasília, but in Guanabara" (Oliveira 2018, p. 57).) The city housed generals Castelo Branco and Costa e Silva. Castelo Branco, Chief of Staff of the Army and representative of the "modernizer" faction, had great prestige and thus served as the most important nexus of the conspiracy. Costa e Silva led a group of officers more closely linked to the troops. The city concentrated the numbers and firepower of the First Army and was thus given priority by the government, which stationed the most loyal commanders there. With no commands in the city, the conspirators were left with an offensive from neighboring São Paulo and Minas Gerais.

At the same time, there would be rebellion in the Northeast and South. Generals Amaury Kruel and Joaquim Justino Alves Bastos, commanders of the Fourth Army in Recife and the Second Army in São Paulo respectively, joined the conspiracy. Benjamim Galhardo, from the Third Army, had not joined, but the conspiracy reached as far as his HQ. In Minas Gerais, the conspiracy was articulated between Mourão Filho, general Carlos Luís Guedes, his subordinate, and governor Magalhães Pinto. As the Army's presence was weak, the Minas Gerais Military Police (PMMG) was prepared for combat (although military resources were also minimal) and incorporated into their plans. The governor also negotiated with Espírito Santo so that the port of Vitória could be used to receive supplies (especially from the United States) during the conflict, with the corridor defended by the PMMG. Mourão was thinking of a surprise operation to enter Guanabara with Juiz de Fora's forces, while Guedes wanted to advance to the border with Rio, wait for the reaction and decide on the advance.

== Bringing forward the coup's date ==
=== Decision in Minas Gerais ===
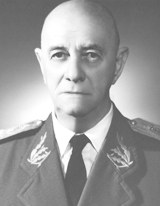
General Mourão Filho

On March 29, the coup's start was scheduled by the Castelo Branco group for April 2, coinciding with a large march along the lines of the March of the Family in Rio de Janeiro. The CGT denounced that a coup would take place on that date. Another date cited was the night of April 10, starting in São Paulo. The outbreak could also start with a password, which would be the arrest of Castelo Branco; his dismissal was imminent and he would refuse to leave office. Leaders in São Paulo and Rio de Janeiro did not intend to give leadership of the movement to Minas Gerais, knowing its military weakness, but the Minas Gerais leaders deliberately brought forward the coup's beginning date at their own will, which was possible thanks to the decentralization of the conspiracy, even though the state groups were connected.

In the midst of the Sailors' Revolt, on March 25, Magalhães Pinto sounded out Castelo Branco and Kruel about their participation and summoned Guedes, Mourão and marshal Odílio Denys to a meeting at the Juiz de Fora airport on the 28th. Before that, Mourão also visited Belo Horizonte. The governor had reason to be in a hurry — in April Guedes would be replaced and Goulart would hold a rally in the capital of Minas Gerais. Furthermore, it is possible that he precipitated the movement to reverse his precarious situation in the UDN, where Lacerda predominated. He tried to take electoral advantage of the coup for his 1965 presidential candidacy. For Mourão there was also a reason for haste — his imminent compulsory retirement. But between these three there were conflicts of interest. Guedes was under the influence of IPES, which sought to restrict Mourão and had a different project from Magalhães, while a dispute arose between Mourão and Magalhães over the leadership of the movement. Guedes and Mourão's accounts contradict each other, each exalting himself.

According to the reports of Guedes and Rubens Bayma Denys, the marshal's son, Mourão was indecisive, and, for Bayma, he was only impelled to act on March 30, when the governor released a manifesto and Guedes began military mobilization in Belo Horizonte to create a fait accompli. IPES wanted Guedes to lead the march, and there is an interpretation that Guedes and Magalhães were already in rebellion. (Note: Pinto 2015, p. 116. For colonel Manoel Soriano Neto, "the revolution actually starts on March 30th and not on the 31st".) It was in this context that Guedes famously stated that "30 is the last day of the full moon, and I don't take any initiative on the wane; if we don't leave under the full moon, I will wait for the new moon, and then it will be too late".

Mourão considered the manifesto and mobilization ineffective (Note: Not even the commander of the Belo Horizonte regiment was informed – he was in Juiz de Fora at the time (Mourão Filho 2011, p. 381). As for the manifesto, "Goulart could even assume that it was a supporting document" (Mourão Filho 2011, p. 372).) and dangerous. If the federal government discovered what they were doing, it could crush Minas Gerais, and if Mourão betrayed Guedes and Magalhães, he could crush them himself for raising their heads first. (Note: "It wouldn't take many hours for the Government – if Magalhães' proclamation were effective enough to alert it – to drop paratroopers in Juiz de Fora and Belo Horizonte and send Armored Division units along the highway" (Mourão Filho 2011, p. 375).) According to his account, at the meeting on the 28th he wanted to act on that same night, but the governor wanted more time. What is known from this meeting is that Mourão was waiting for a manifesto from Magalhães to act. He needed to mobilize his troops before launching the manifesto, (Note: "What if the phone call failed? Anything could happen. In this case, the Governor of Minas, assisted by the weird general Guedes, would be triggering a revolution, while the Command in Chief would be in the most complete ignorance of what was happening in the State capital" (Mourão Filho 2011, pp. 374–375).) which would provide him with a civilian leader's legitimacy. This manifesto would have to emphatically demand the president's ouster. He felt betrayed when Magalhães disclosed the manifesto on the 30th, before he mobilized, and disregarded his requirements on the wording. When he received emissaries from the governor with a copy of the manifesto, at dawn on the 31st, and had his disappointment reaffirmed, he initiated the coup himself.

=== Information about the imminence of the coup ===
In the last days of March, the Minas Gerais leadership received information from conspirators in the Navy, and according to Bayma Denys, after the meeting on the 28th, emissaries left Minas Gerais to inform Castelo Branco, Costa e Silva (who was skeptical) and Justino of the movement's imminence. Mourão sent an emissary to Kruel, and even went to Rio de Janeiro to talk with his brother Riograndino Kruel; he did not intend to march alone.

The Juiz de Fora airport was busy, especially as the 28th was Holy Saturday, and Mourão was concerned about the government finding out about the meeting. A communist militant did in fact report the abnormality to the party's military sector, but the information was considered irrelevant. On the 30th, journalist David Nasser informed Army Police colonel Domingos Ventura of the military preparations in Minas Gerais. Ventura telephoned his contacts in Minas and the rumors were denied. Also that day, the Deputy Chief of the War Minister's Office passed through Belo Horizonte and the HQ in Juiz de Fora and the conspirators were worried, but he did not notice what was happening. To assemble its battalions, the PMMG made large transfers of personnel and equipment across the state until the 29th, which could have been noticed. There was thus a failure in government intelligence.

The American Embassy and the CIA tracked the imminence of the coup. On March 27 Lincoln Gordon reported that the Castelo Branco group was waiting for some movement by the president or a general strike to act and suggested that his supporters in São Paulo receive logistical support. On March 30, the CIA reported that the "revolution by anti-Goulart forces" would begin in Minas Gerais and São Paulo in the coming days and that "last minute negotiations" were underway involving the states under control of the democratic governors. On the same day, military attaché Vernon Walters, in contact with the Castelo Branco group, reported on his possible dismissal and flight to São Paulo, where the movement expected to begin that week would be concentrated.

== Possible civil war ==
=== Expected duration and intensity ===
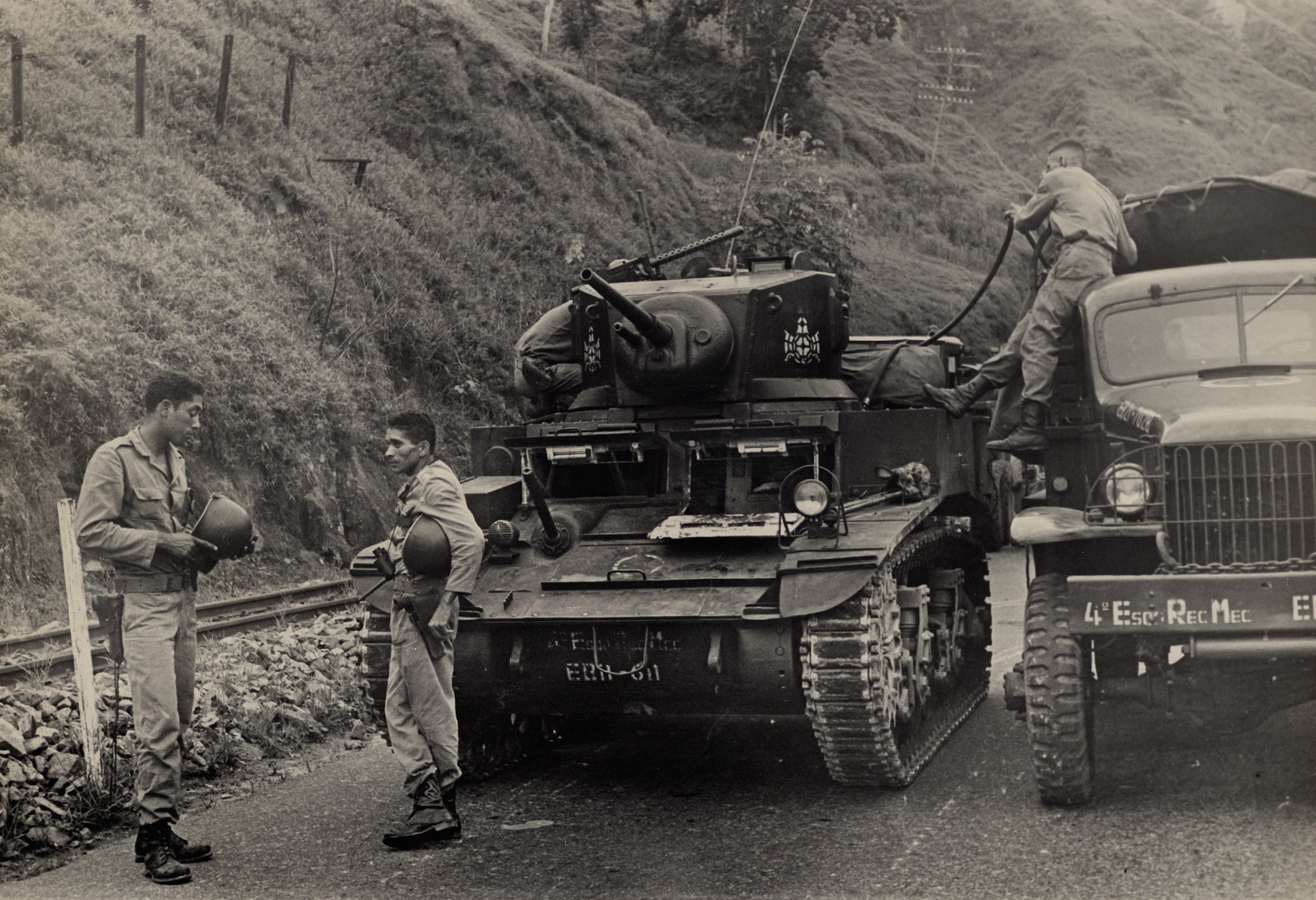
Coupist M3 Stuart in the Minas Gerais front

Coup planning took into account the hypothesis of resistance and combat. Most conspirators expected resistance. According to general Muricy, he predicted the duration of a month, others, up to six months, and only general Golbery predicted that the government would fall like a house of cards. (Note: Testimony in the documentary Jango, cited in Domingos, Charles Sidarta Machado; Beck, José Orestes; Quinsani, Rafael Hansen (orgs.) (2018). Os ciclos da história contemporânea, volume 1: reflexões a partir da relação Cinema-História (PDF). Porto Alegre: Fi. Archived from the original (PDF) on July 2, 2022.. p. 133.) For him, the bloodiest process would be in Rio de Janeiro and Rio Grande do Sul. Conspirators in the Northeast expected local resistance. A source in Belo Horizonte informed the CIA that the movement would be bloody and would not end quickly.

Mourão Filho expected at least four months. If Minas Gerais failed to advance against Rio de Janeiro, he could apply scorched earth tactics and retreat to southern Bahia, where officers of the 6th Military Region and rural civil forces would support his resistance against loyalist advances to the Northeast. Magalhães Pinto expected 10 days, but Minas Gerais prepared for up to three months of fighting, distributing weapons and uniforms to volunteers, organizing doctors and nurses, and raising food stocks. In São Paulo there were also preparations such as the enlistment of volunteers and collection of medication. In Guanabara, the population, anticipating civil war, bought food.

=== Actual level of violence ===
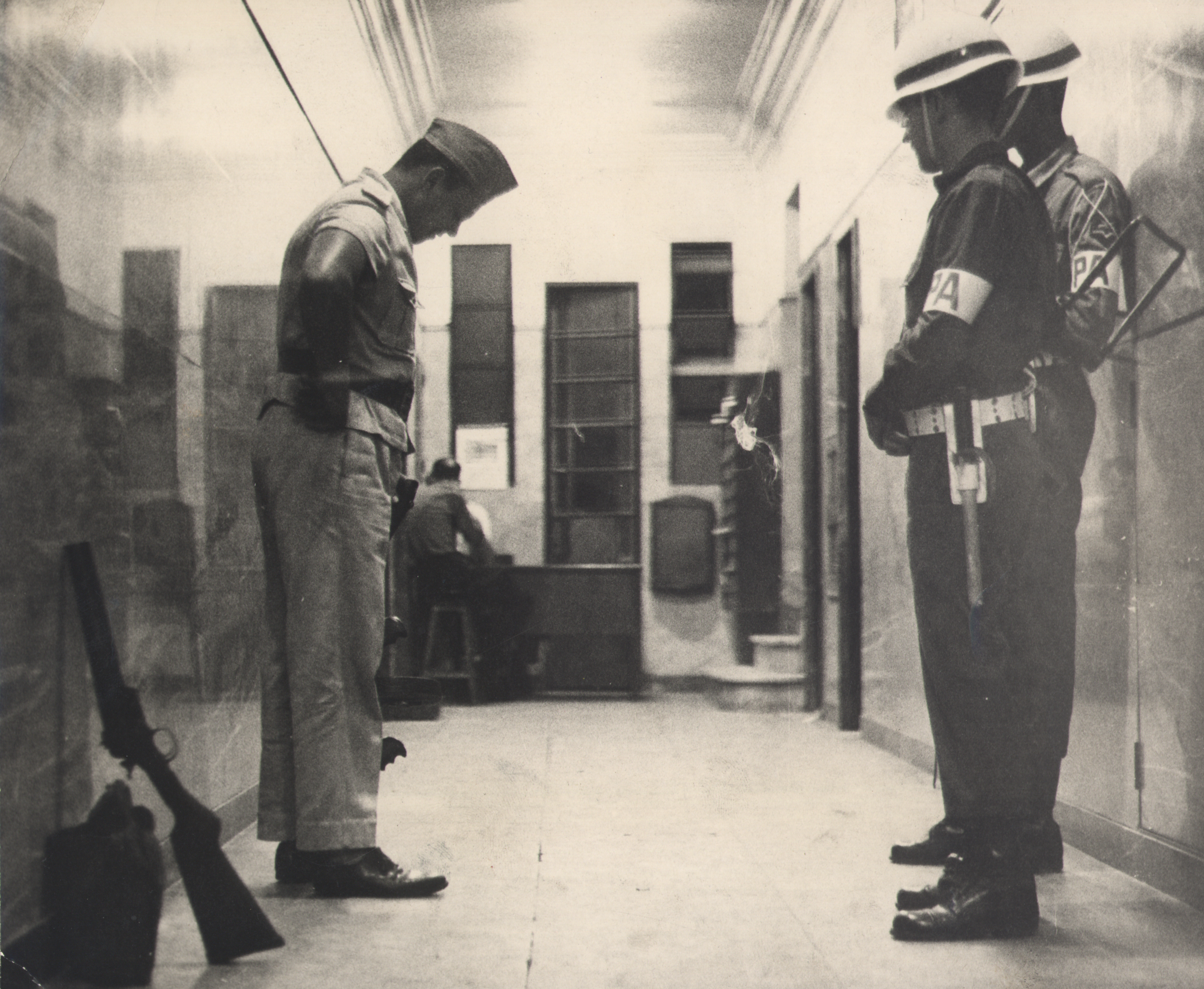
A military policeman hands down his weapon to loyalist Air Force soldiers in Rio de Janeiro

The crisis was resolved by a potential but unfulfilled armed conflict. As reported in Os idos de março e a queda em abril, published shortly after the coup, the Minas Gerais front had everything in place for a civil war, and "the opposing troops physically confronted each other, loaded their weapons and were ready to fire the first shot", but there was no combat. Only during the takeover of the Coast Artillery HQ, in Rio de Janeiro, was there a brief exchange of fire and a fight between soldiers, with one wounded on each side, and that was the most striking episode of intermilitary violence in the city.

"The speed of events was so astounding that the federal government's defense forces seemed to not even exist". Though the movement may be characterized as a bluff, since the coup's leaders did not have a supremacy of military force at first, most officers with a loyalist or professional profile ended up joining the coup or not resisting. The president fell through "chain defections, a mass adhesion of mid-ranking officers and the renunciation of resistance on the part of minority officers and recalcitrant enlisted personnel".

Although the success obtained was a surprise, defections were part of the strategy. In response to the offensive from São Paulo and Minas Gerais, the loyalist high command moved troop commanders to the interior of Rio de Janeiro, where they were further from its influence. On the Minas Gerais front, general Muricy relied on the political fluidity of the moment to overcome his material weakness.

Much of the deposition was decided over telephone calls. The absence of war and the reduced number of civilian deaths gave rise to the thesis that an aseptic "phone war" took place, following the tradition that national regime changes, such as the Independence of Brazil (Note: See also Brazilian War of Independence.) and the Proclamation of the Republic, are bloodless. On the other hand, many acts of arbitrariness occurred, such as arrests without a warrant, torture and violent interrogations. Organized labor was a preferential target of this repression.

Elio Gaspari accounted for 20 deaths in 1964, seven of them during the coup, all of them civilians: three in Rio de Janeiro, (Note: One of which was accidentally shot by a colleague.) two in Recife and two in Governador Valadares, Minas Gerais; for Latin American standards, the number was low, but for Brazil, it was intermediate. The torture of Pernambuco communist leader Gregório Bezerra on April 2 was notorious, and the new regime had torture from the beginning. Thousands were arrested in the weeks after the coup; plans for immediate arrests were executed, as in São Paulo and in "Operation Cage" in Minas Gerais. In Guanabara, the violence was conducted by the Military and Civil Police and paramilitaries and intensified after the president's departure.

=== Reasons for the short duration ===
==== Lack of action ====
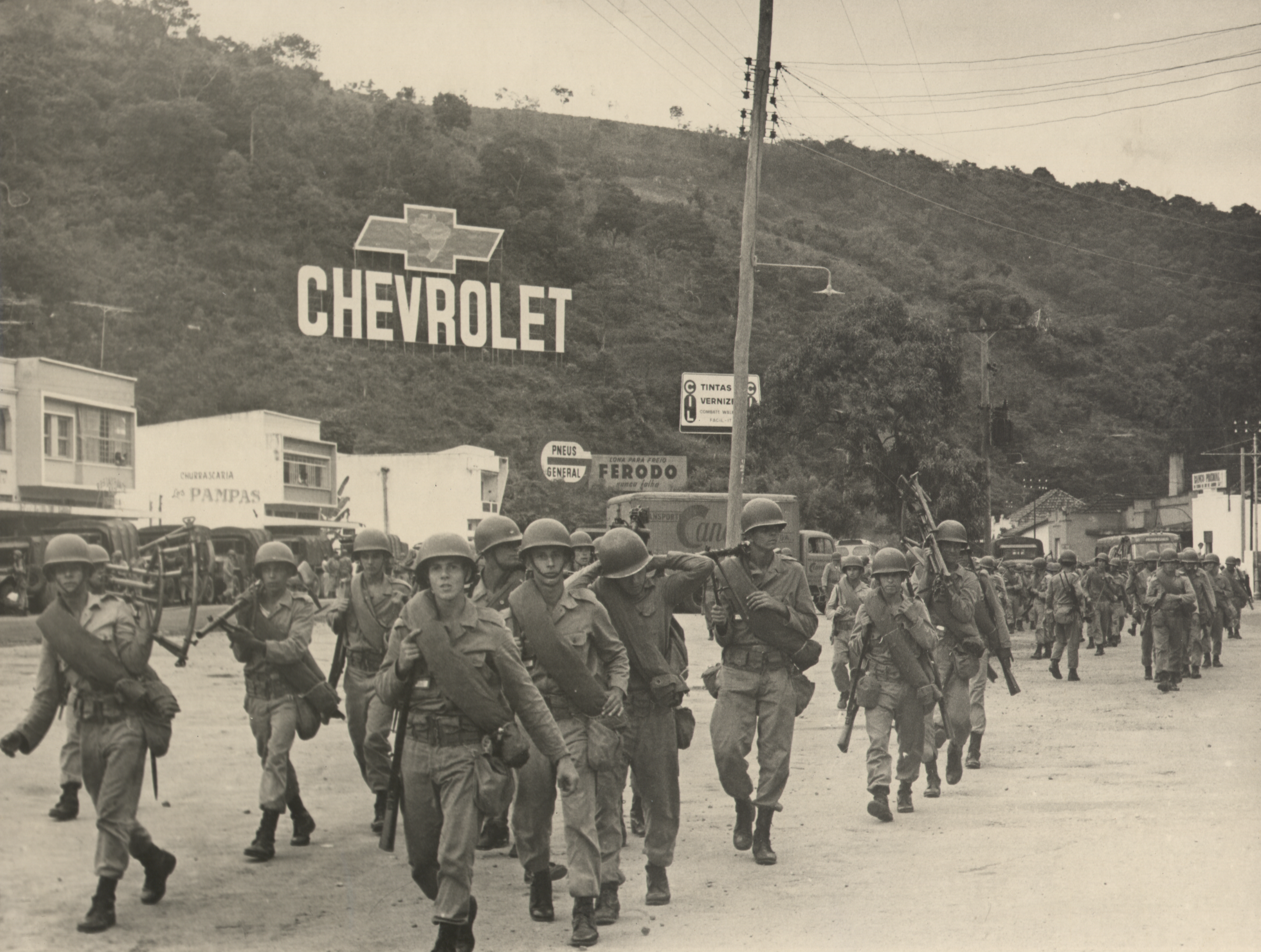
Loyalist soldiers in Areal, Rio de Janeiro

The president had several opportunities to confront rebel troops. His best chances were in the twelve hours between the outbreak of the movement in Minas Gerais and its open publicity from 17:00. During this period, the government's military apparatus was standing by inertia, Mourão Filho had not received any relevant support from other commanders and would not have been able to resist first-rate units from Rio de Janeiro and São Paulo. Even the delivery of arms, ammunition, and fuel by the Americans to the rebels would take days to occur, and the Minas Gerais rebellion could have been defeated in its first 24 hours.

Commanders awaited the president's orders, but they never came, and the government's vulnerability became visible. Labor activists and sergeants were also waiting. Colonel-aviator Rui Moreira Lima, commander of the Santa Cruz Air Force Base, made a reconnaissance flight over the Minas Gerais column on the 1st and left four F-8 (Gloster Meteor) jets ready for an attack, which could have interrupted the offensive. However, he received no orders. General Luís Tavares da Cunha Melo, sent against the Minas Gerais column with superior forces, was willing to advance to Juiz de Fora but received only defensive orders.

In Porto Alegre, on April 2, with resistance still possible but already doomed to defeat, Goulart vetoed any bloodshed in defense of his mandate and left the city. (Note: The president had a similar attitude during the Legality Campaign, accepting parliamentarism and rejecting bloodshed and Brizola's offer to fight. Ferreira, Jorge (1997). "A Legalidade Traída: os Dias Sombrios de Agosto e Setembro de 1961" (PDF). Tempo. 2 (3). Rio de Janeiro: 149–182..) His inaction in ordering the offensive was fundamental to his downfall. For Elio Gaspari, the president would need not only to use the military apparatus but also to radicalize, mobilizing sergeants and trade unionists and attacking Congress and the governors of Guanabara, Minas Gerais and São Paulo. Nonetheless, he believes attributing the defeat to Goulart was a "historiographical agreement between winners and losers", as his allies also acted passively.

Among loyalist officers, unifying factors made military cohesion more important than loyalty to the president. The government's military apparatus was caught in a moment of weakness: Minister of War Jair Dantas Ribeiro, whose respect among officers could have made the coup difficult, was hospitalized. The appointment policy had many errors, leaving conspiratorial officers with commands. Information was not used properly, and the ideological indoctrination by the conspirators was ignored: the Revolutionary War Doctrine was disseminated through official channels in publications, courses and lectures, as the Army General Staff and military schools were used as an "archive" for right-wing officers. ESG ideas were being spread among officers, anti-communist sentiment was commonplace and leftist radicalization had a unifying effect. Revolts in the lower ranks convinced even reformist officers that the military institution, with the president's encouragement, was disintegrating.

==== President's calculations ====
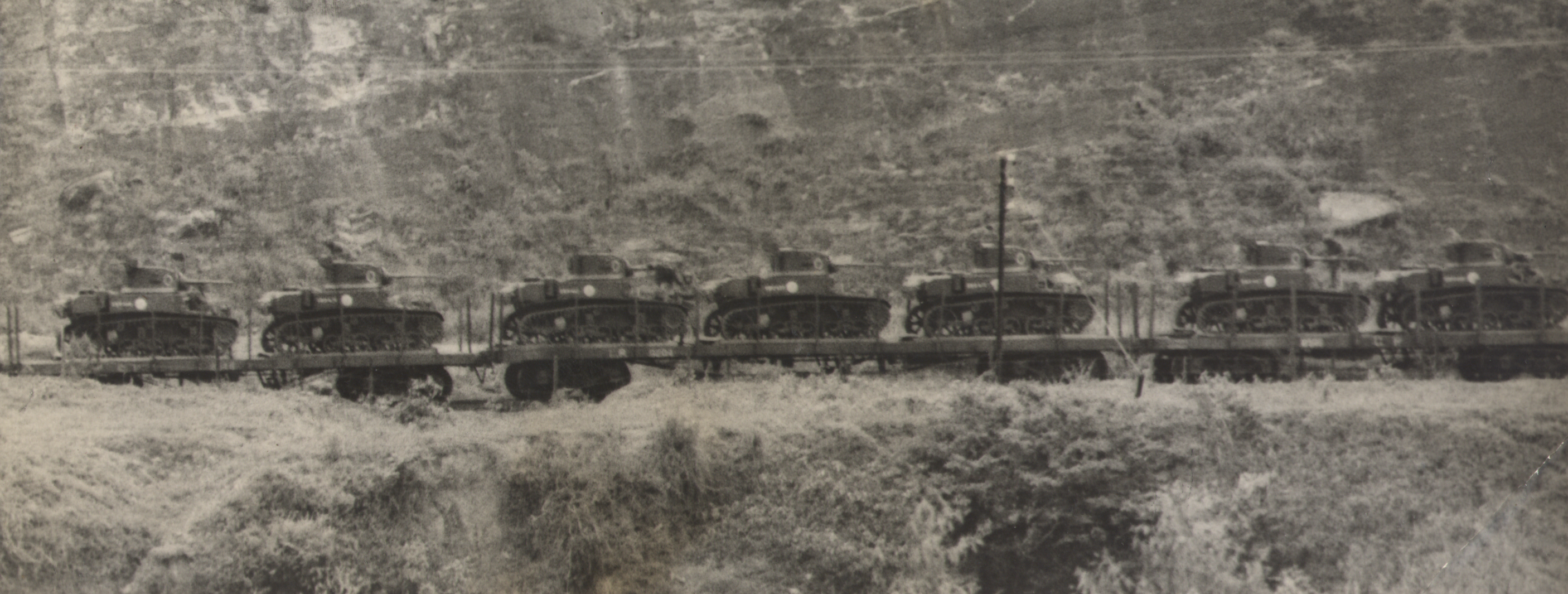
Amaury Kruel's Second Army tanks

Goulart's rejection of bloodshed has been interpreted as cowardice or prudence. The president had some considerations. He understood the strength of the coup and the broad internal coalition attacking him, and he knew that he would have the United States as an enemy, one that could even provide military support to his enemies. On the morning of April 1, he was informed by San Tiago Dantas that an alternative opposition government would be recognized abroad. Furthermore, both he and his allies probably calculated that there would soon be a new civilian government, as with previous military interventions in 1945, 1954, 1955 and 1961, and did not imagine a prolonged dictatorship. Thus, like Vargas, Jango could have waited in São Borja until his chance to return to politics. There is the thesis that his final attitudes in government were a "bloodless suicide".

Negotiation with the rebels in Minas Gerais was proposed by San Tiago Dantas in a telephone call to Afonso Arinos. However, Magalhães Pinto would only agree to talk to Jango if both resigned. The president received some political solutions. Peri Constant Bevilacqua, Chief of Staff of the Armed Forces, offered himself as a mediator if the president were willing "to prohibit the general strike announced by the workers, to intervene in the unions, to govern with the parties and not with the CGT, relying on the Armed forces". Juscelino Kubitschek suggested "the replacement of the cabinet by another one that is markedly conservative, the launch of a manifesto repudiating communism, the punishment of sailors and other initiatives of the same content". Amaury Kruel offered the Second Army in exchange for "the closure of the CGT, the UNE and other popular organizations, intervention in the unions and the removal of assistants to the President of the Republic who were identified as communists". Jair Dantas Ribeiro made a proposal similar to Kruel's on the 1st.

Jango considered that he would be even weaker than in the parliamentary system and refused. "Even if I gave in to Kruel's appeals and managed to remain in the presidency, I would be a man under the tutelage of generals, prevented from carrying out reforms and, more seriously, an accomplice in the repression of trade unions and the left (...) I would rather fall".

== Military operations and exile of the president ==
=== Southeast ===
==== March 31 ====
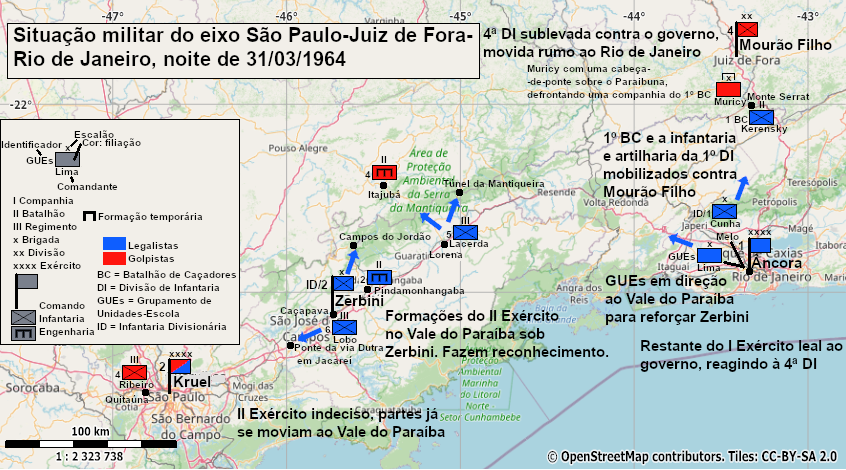
Military situation on the night of March 31

In Juiz de Fora, at 5:00 am on March 31, Mourão Filho made several phone calls announcing the rebellion. Emissaries from Minas achieved the defection of the garrison in Espírito Santo. Castelo Branco thought the move was premature and wanted the Minas Gerais leadership to back down, but it was too late. The first deployment of the offensive was the 2nd Company of the 10th Infantry Regiment (RI), sent at 09-10:00 to occupy the bridge over the Paraibuna River, on the border with Rio de Janeiro.

Around 09:00 Carlos Lacerda had the Military Police defending his Guanabara Palace. Castelo Branco went to work at the General Staff in the Duque de Caxias Palace, headquarters of the Ministry of War. Costa e Silva also attended. The loyalists surrounded the Palace and general Armando de Moraes Âncora, commander of the First Army, had the order to arrest Castelo. However, the hours passed, loyalist reinforcements left, coup leaders left the building unbothered and only at 18:00 Âncora gave the order, with the office already empty. The government thus missed the opportunity to arrest Castelo Branco and Costa e Silva, who hid in safehouses through the city.

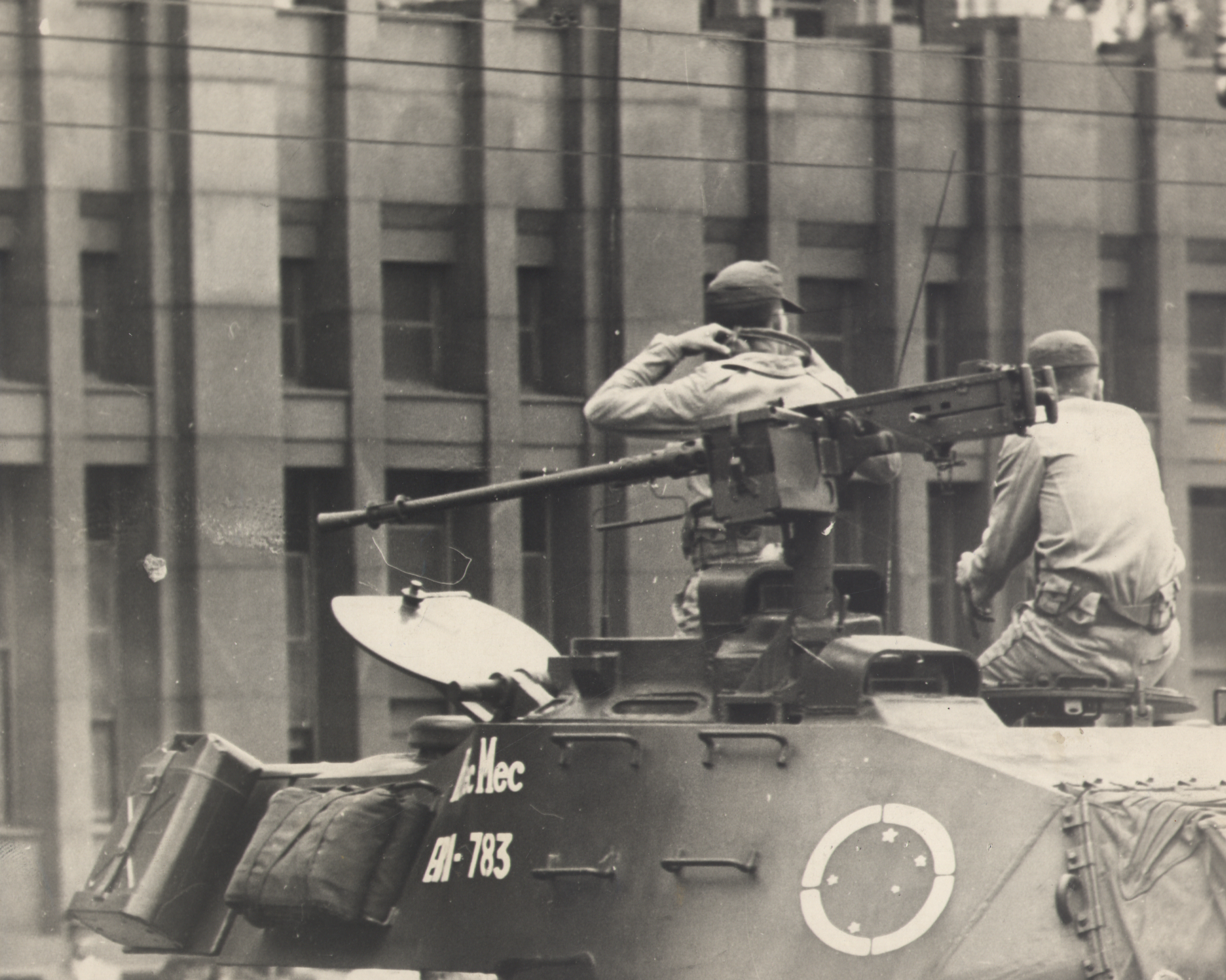
Tank in front of the Ministry of War

Mourão Filho delegated command of his forces on the Rio de Janeiro front, the Tiradentes Detachment, to general Muricy. It was a mixed Army and PMMG formation with 2,714 men, more than half poorly trained recruits, and few hours worth of ammunition. The strong legalist reaction was delegated to general Cunha Melo, with the 1st, 2nd and 3rd Infantry Regiments, from Vila Militar and São Gonçalo. He was confident. As they departed in the late afternoon, the 1st Battalion of Caçadores (BC), from Petrópolis, went ahead as the first loyalist element. Mourão released his manifesto to the press at 5:00 pm. At that moment, the entire 10th RI (Note: Displaced at 12:30 (D'Aguiar 1976, p. 135); the source does not consider the gradual arrival of units. The 11th RI, from São João del-Rei, only arrived in Juiz de Fora at 18:00 (Mourão Filho 2011, p. 455), and the battalion of the 12th RI, from Belo Horizonte, at 22:00 (Mourão Filho 2011, p. 381). See also Muricy 1981, p. 545.) was already on a bridgehead in the Rio de Janeiro town of Monte Serrat. Since at least 18:00, the 1st BC, led by lieutenant colonel Kerensky Túlio Motta, occupied positions in front of the Minas Gerais troops. Kerensky was a loyalist, but two of his platoons joined the rebels around midnight and he had to retreat.

The Second Army remained undecided. General Kruel, a personal friend of Goulart, prioritized forcing the government to turn to the right rather than overthrowing the president. When his demands were refused, he joined the coup at midnight and ordered an offensive through the Paraíba valley. Had he decided to remain faithful to Jango, some of his subordinates were already ready to depose his command and arrest him. Another subordinate, the loyalist general Euryale de Jesus Zerbini, held back the São Paulo regiments in the Paraíba valley, obstructing the offensive. The federal government promised to reinforce Zerbini with the School-Unit Group (GUEs).

At the Guanabara Palace, there was much apprehension when a convoy of loyalist admiral Cândido Aragão's marines passed by after 21-22:00. Carlos Lacerda and his supporters feared an invasion, but the marines only reinforced the president's guard at the Laranjeiras Palace, a few blocks from Guanabara. Numerous volunteers flocked to the palace to defend Lacerda and the roads were blocked with garbage trucks, but the defenders would have been at an overwhelming disadvantage against a marine offensive. Aragão wanted to attack but had no orders from the president.

==== April 1 ====
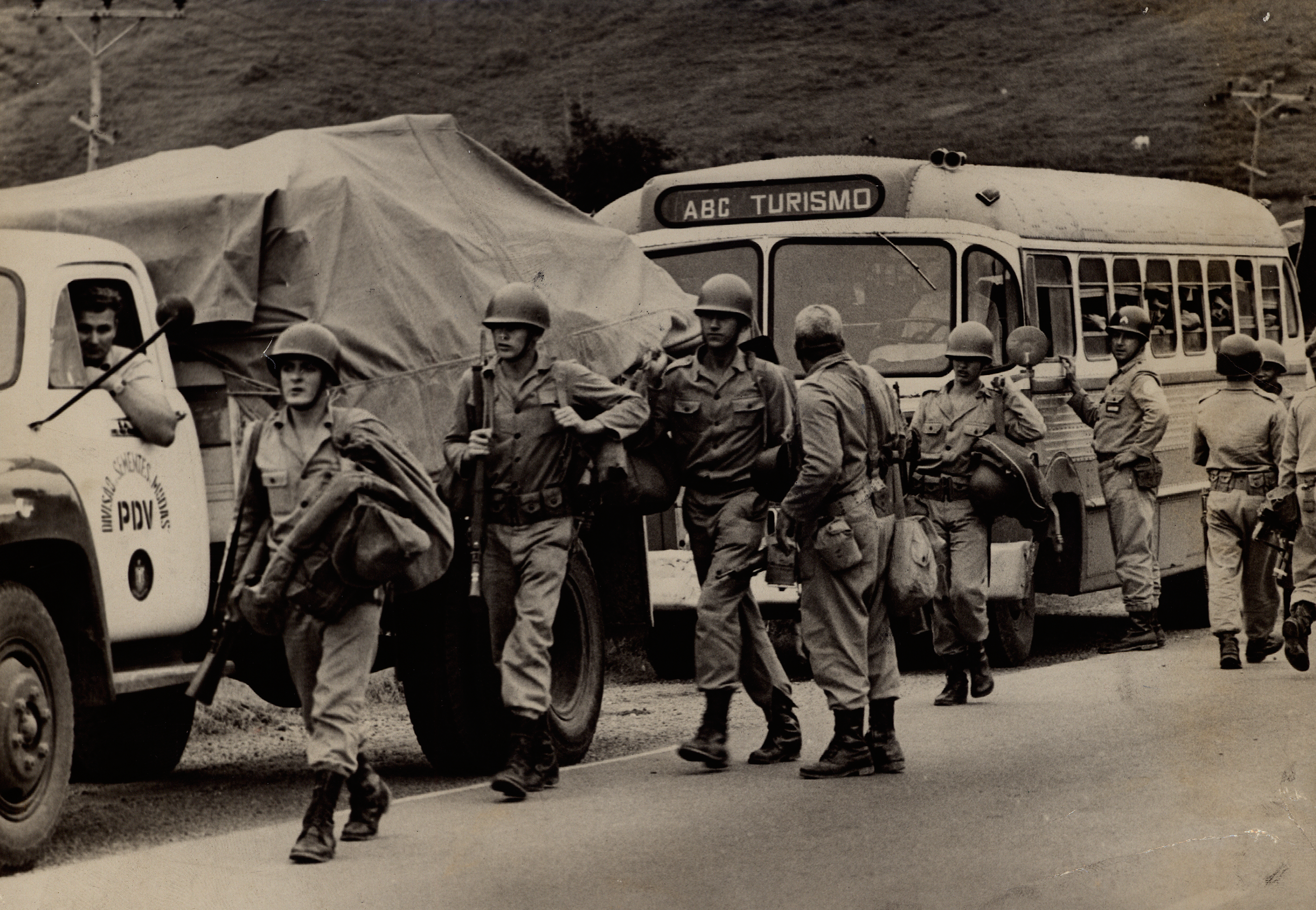
Movements in the Paraíba Valley

At 2:00 am on the 1st, general Âncora ordered Aragão not to attack Lacerda. Nevertheless, the governor had several more false alarms of an invasion throughout the day and challenged the admiral over the radio. In the Paraíba valley, São Paulo's regiments rejected Zerbini's authority and accepted Kruel's at dawn, starting their journey towards Rio de Janeiro, while at the Military Academy of Agulhas Negras (AMAN), halfway between the cities, general Emílio Garrastazu Médici joined the cause of Costa e Silva and Kruel.

At dawn, Rio de Janeiro's garrison remained loyal. Only in Urca did the Army Command and General Staff School (ECEME), rebelled since the morning of the 31st, spread the rebellion to neighboring schools. ECEME followed Castelo Branco's orders and had a coordinating role. Fort Copacabana joined at 07:00 am, and the neighboring Coast Artillery HQ was forcibly taken by 21 officers after noon.

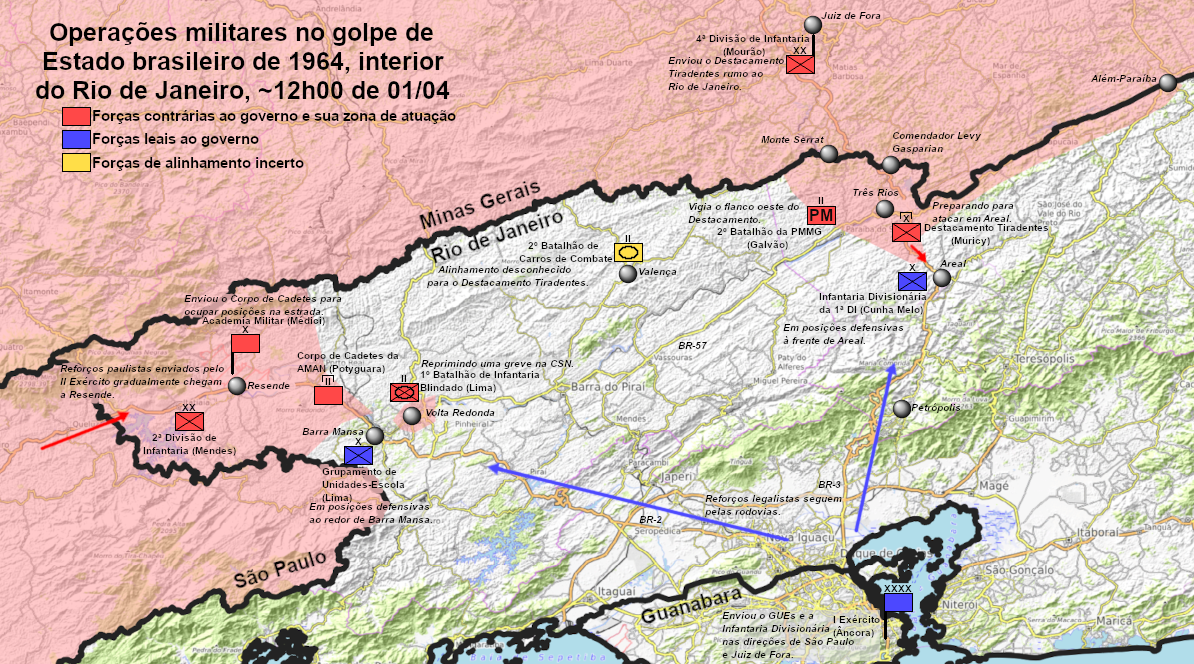
Situation on the Minas Gerais and São Paulo fronts around noon

On the União e Indústria road, the 1st RI (Sampaio Regiment), Cunha Melo's vanguard, was supposed to entrench itself in Três Rios, but went ahead and joined the Tiradentes Detachment at 05:00 in the morning. Strengthened by this defection, Muricy advanced and at 11:00 sighted Cunha Melo's 2nd RI in defensive positions in front of Areal. At the Via Dutra, general Médici entrenched his AMAN cadets between Resende and Barra Mansa in the morning as a psychological barrier to the elite troops of the GUEs, who were coming from Guanabara under the loyalist general Anfrísio da Rocha Lima. From 11:30 to 13:00 units from São Paulo arrived and were welcomed in Resende, while loyalists took positions on the other side of the front line.

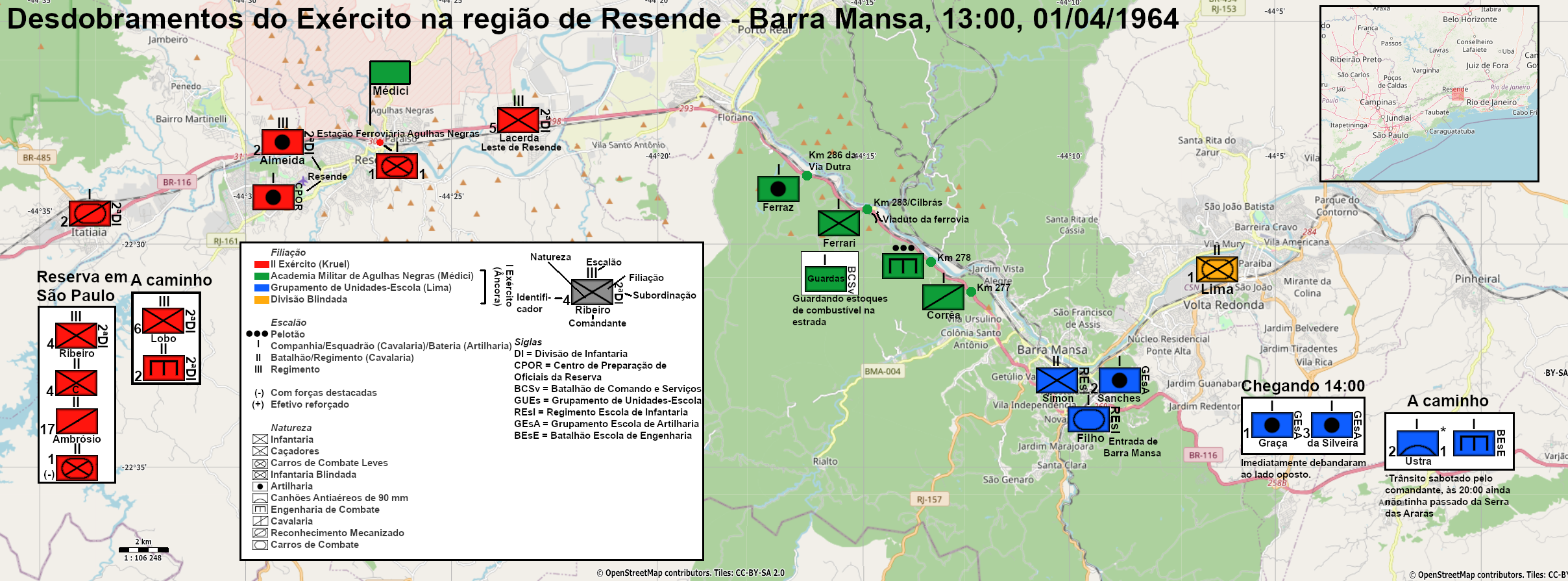
Meeting of forces on the São Paulo front

Around 9:00 am, Goulart communicated to the Planalto Palace that he would continue to Brasília. In addition to the impact of the defection of the Sampaio Regiment and Second Army and San Tiago Dantas' warning about the United States, he would be arrested if he remained in the city. General Âncora had advised his departure: admiral Aragão's marines had been pinned down by the admiralty and the remaining loyal forces, the Army Police and the Guard Battalion, would not be able to face the rest of the garrison. The presidential plane took off at 12:45 pm. Loyal officers were not informed. The departure was seen as an escape and precipitated the dissolution of the military apparatus in Rio de Janeiro.

The platoon of tanks responsible for defending the Laranjeiras Palace was divided: one part went to the Guanabara Palace and another to ECEME. General Âncora was informed by Assis Brasil that Jango did not want a military clash. When he received a call from Costa e Silva at 1:30 pm, he agreed to negotiate with Kruel at AMAN. At 15:00 the First Army ordered an end to resistance. Cunha Melo negotiated with the Tiradentes Detachment to allow it to pass without resistance. In Resende, at 18:00 Âncora met Kruel and acknowledged the First Army's defeat. Âncora was the acting Minister of War, but while he was at AMAN, at 17:00 Costa e Silva entered the Duque de Caxias Palace and proclaimed himself minister. Coupists also took control of the Navy and Air Force. The Tiradentes Detachment entered Guanabara on the 2nd.

=== Center-West ===
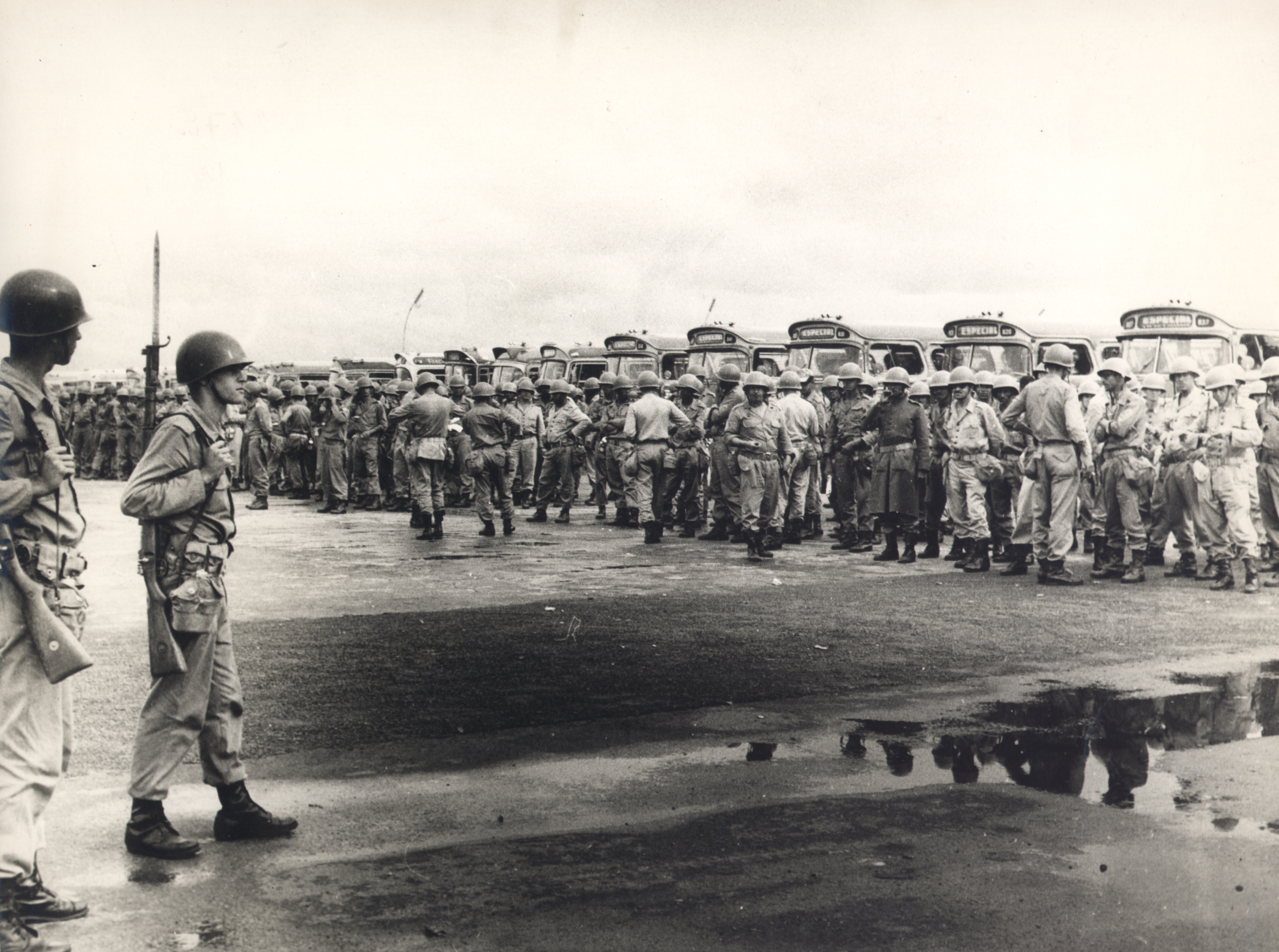
Soldiers in Brasília at the beginning of April

In Mato Grosso, the 4th Cavalry Division and the 9th Military Region, subordinated to the Second Army, joined on the 31st. Colonel Carlos de Meira Mattos, commander of the 16th BC, from Cuiabá, advanced towards Brasília on the 31st and by the afternoon of the 1st, one of his columns had already been airlifted to Jataí, in the south of Goiás. The 10th BC, from Goiânia, was persuaded not to obstruct the passage. Meanwhile, general Nicolau Fico, head of the Brasília Military Command and 11th Military Region, sent a company from the Presidential Guard Battalion (BGP) in the morning to defend the border between Goiás and Minas Gerais. In response, the 10th Battalion of the PMMG moved from Montes Claros to Paracatu, on the Minas Gerais side of the border. Upon hearing that the First Army was no longer resisting, the BGP company withdrew.

Goulart arrived in Brasília at 15:00 or 16:30 in the afternoon. (Note: See Villa, Marco Antonio (2014). Jango: um perfil (1945-1964) (1 ed.). São Paulo: Globo Livros. and Fico 2008, p. 105.) His allies debated whether he should remain in the capital and mount resistance or continue on to Rio Grande do Sul. Brasília had the unique advantage of offering the legitimacy of the seat of power, but it left Goulart isolated, far from popular support and threatened by forces coming from outside the Federal District. General Fico swore allegiance, but his forces were minimal, and many of his officers already rejected the authority of the president. After 16:00 the Third Army was informed of Goulart's decision to proceed to Porto Alegre, where he still hoped to have support. Due to the fear of the presidential plane being intercepted by the Brazilian Air Force, the trip was planned in a Coronado, but the aircraft had a breakdown, (Note: Historians cite this event as sabotage or as a malfunction of an old aircraft, already present in the United States. Manoel Leães, Jango's private pilot, spoke to the pilot and confirmed that it was not sabotage. See Silva 2014a, p. 380 and Faria 2013, p. 437.) the trip was delayed and took place with a smaller plane, which took off at around 23:30.

Darcy Ribeiro, head of the Civilian Cabinet, remained in the city to maintain the government until the Third Army could act. The government counted on the cooperation of general Fico, who was supposed to leave Congress under police surveillance and not protect it with the army. Auro de Moura Andrade, the president of the Senate who'd already broken his ties with the government, wanted exactly the opposite and feared the invasion of Congress by a militia assembled by Darcy Ribeiro at the Teatro Experimental. General Fico took his side and, obeying Costa e Silva, the new Minister of War, positioned the Army on the Ministries Esplanade. Congress assembled and declared the presidency of the Republic vacant at dawn. By the 2nd, the Armed Forces loyal to Costa e Silva were in full control. Colonel Meira Mattos arrived by air, and the Caicó Detachment, a mixed Army and PMMG force, arrived by road.

=== North and Northeast ===
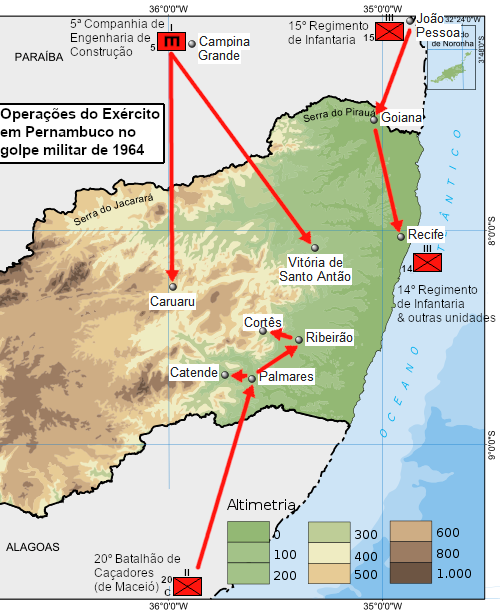
Operations in Pernambuco

General Justino's Fourth Army published its pro-coup manifesto at 09:00 am on the 1st. In the general's words, "no one could oppose the weapons of the 4th Army". Before making his defection public, he had already banned demonstrations, occupied sensitive points and ordered displacements from Paraíba and Alagoas to Pernambuco, cutting the state from north to south by occupying Vitória do Santo Antão, Caruaru, Palmares, Catende and Goiana. The target was governor Miguel Arraes, surrounded in the Palace of the Princesses by the local garrison. The Military Police guard was sent away, and after 3:00 pm the governor was arrested. Colonel Hangho Trench, commander of the Pernambuco Military Police and loyal to Arraes, wanted to entrench his headquarters in the Derby barracks but was arrested by the Army. Inland, there were reactions by the Peasant Leagues, as in Vitória do Santo Antão and Caruaru. Seixas Dória, governor of Sergipe, was deposed and imprisoned like Arraes.

The Amazon Military Command joined around 3:00 pm on April 1.

=== South ===
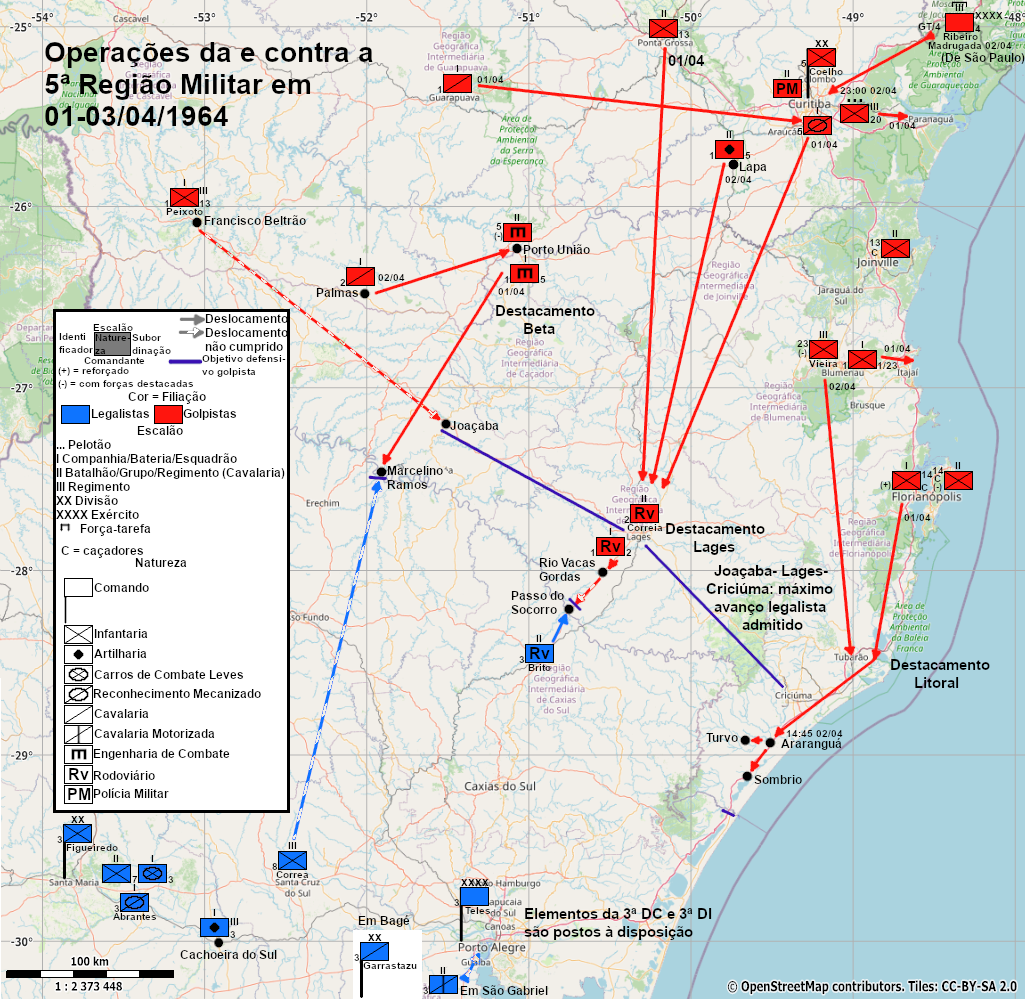
Operations on the Paraná-Rio Grande do Sul axis

At 21:55 on the 31st, general Ladário Pereira Telles, who was supposed to assume command of the Third Army, took off from Rio de Janeiro in the company of Silvino Castor da Nóbrega, commander of the 5th Military Region/Infantry Division (5th RM/DI), from Paraná and Santa Catarina. Both were loyalists. Silvino was on vacation and the plane was supposed to land in Curitiba on the way, but coupists in the 5th RM/DI conspired with the Air Force Base to prevent the landing. In Porto Alegre Ildo Meneghetti, governor of Rio Grande do Sul, was preparing to join the coup with general Galhardo, who promised to arrest Ladário when he arrived, but that was bravado and he handed over command at 02:50 at dawn.

Ladário allied himself with Leonel Brizola (at this time a federal deputy) in his attempt to revive the Legality Campaign. Thus, he sent a letter requisitioning the state's police force, the Military Brigade. Added to the risk of an invasion of the Piratini Palace by a crowd of pro-Jango and Brizola demonstrators, this led to the departure of the governor from the capital in the early afternoon. Through Operation Farroupilha, the state government was transferred to Passo Fundo, where it arrived on the night of the 1st. Meanwhile, the Military Brigade's requisition failed, and it remained loyal to the governor.

General Dário Coelho took over the 5th RM/DI and at 07:00 announced his defection and organized the Beta, Lages and Litoral detachments to advance to Rio Grande do Sul. The farthest south they got was Araranguá, Santa Catarina, which was reached by a company of the Litoral detachment at 14:45 the next day. On the 1st general Silvino tried to give orders from Porto Alegre, but they were refused. Ladário organized three tactical groups in the interior of Rio Grande do Sul to march with the 5th RM/DI under the command of Silvino, but that too was refused — at 10:00 am general Mário Poppe de Figueiredo, of the 3rd DI, had joined the coup, as the 2nd and 3rd Cavalry Divisions (DCs), respectively from Uruguaiana and Bagé, had already done earlier.

The 3rd DI had considerable troops and was headquartered in Santa Maria, a crucial railway junction in the interior of Rio Grande do Sul. The other two divisions were the 1st DC, from Santiago, and the 6th DI, from Porto Alegre. General João de Deus Nunes Saraiva, of the 1st DC, obeyed Ladário's call to appear in Porto Alegre. Adalberto Pereira dos Santos, from the 6th DI, was dismissed but fled to one of his units in Cruz Alta, while colonel Jarbas Ferreira de Souza, considered a PCB sympathizer, took over in the capital. Ladário considered loyal (with reservations) only the 1st DC and the garrisons of the capital, São Leopoldo and Vacaria. The Air Force was in his favor. Vacaria's unit was a construction engineering battalion and maintained control of the bridge over the Pelotas River, on the Santa Catarina border. Porto Alegre remained a loyalist stronghold, with civilian pro-government mobilization concentrated in the city hall. (Note: Zardo 2010, p. 52. According to Ferreira, Jorge (2011). João Goulart: uma biografia (4 ed.). Rio de Janeiro: Civilização Brasileira.. p. 505: "Porto Alegre, at that time, was a labourist stronghold. Ladário Telles and Brizola dominated the capital. Governor Ildo Meneghetti (...) practically deposed from office by Brizola". Chagas, Carlos (1985). A Guerra das Estrelas (1964/1984): Os bastidores das sucessões presidenciais (2 ed.). Porto Alegre: L&PM.. p. 53, defines Porto Alegre as having only become "revolutionary" on the 2nd.) But it was not possible to repeat 1961: most of the Third Army obeyed Costa e Silva.

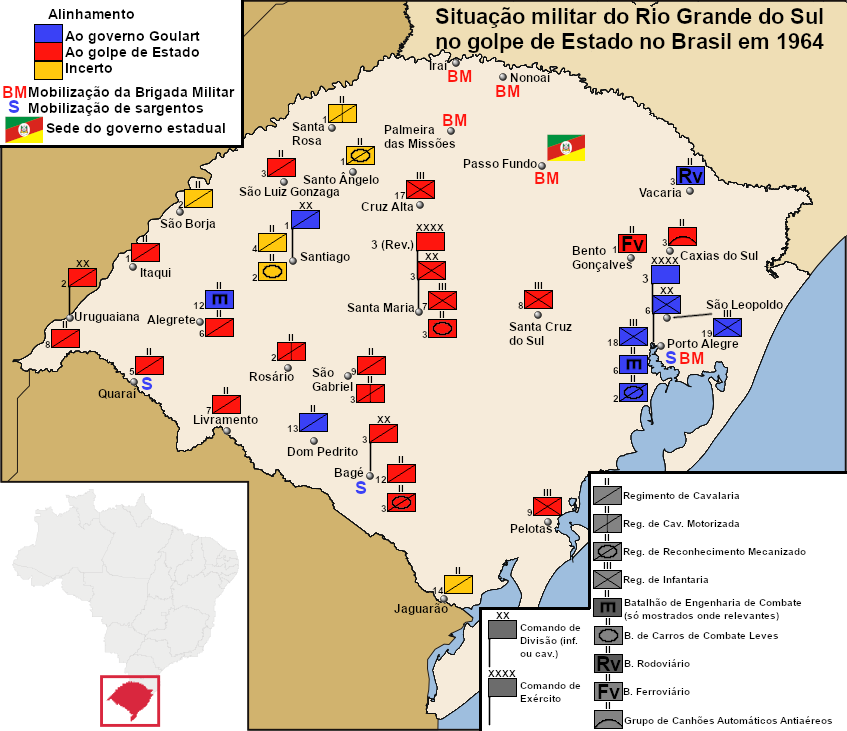
Adherence to the coup among the garrisons in Rio Grande do Sul

Goulart arrived in Porto Alegre at 03:58 on April 2. At 08:00, he conferenced with Brizola, Ladário and his generals. Ladário and Brizola wanted to fight by arming five thousand volunteers, mobilizing national public opinion and reconstituting the government in Porto Alegre, with Ladário as Minister of War and Brizola as Minister of Justice. Goulart could watch from São Borja. However, the generals were pessimistic, and Ladário himself admitted the gravity of the situation: "my soldier's mentality is that as long as you have a handful of men, you resist, until you hope that victory will be won by a miracle". The Armed Forces converged to a civil war in Rio Grande do Sul. The 5th RM/DI headed to the Rio Grande do Sul border and was reinforced by Tactical Group 4, from São Paulo. The divisions in Rio Grande do Sul, as well as the state government, were preparing to attack Porto Alegre. The national Navy and Air Force would act in their support.

Jango did not want civil war. Possibly, in Rio de Janeiro he had already decided not to resist and passed through Brasília and Porto Alegre just to see his wife and Brizola. He did not resign, but that moment was effectively his resignation. At 11:30 he took off for São Borja, where he stayed on April 3 at his farm until he heard that the local regiment was looking for him. His fate, after April 4, was exile, where he would remain until his death in 1976. After 09:10 on the 2nd, general Poppe declared himself commander of the "Revolutionary Third Army", unifying the various divisions that had joined the coup. Ladário agreed to hand over his position; for Castelo Branco, the last pocket of military resistance was coming to an end. The first arrests in Porto Alegre were made that same day. On April 3, Governor Meneghetti and general Poppe converged their forces on Porto Alegre, where they assumed control.

== Reactions ==
=== Governors' positions ===
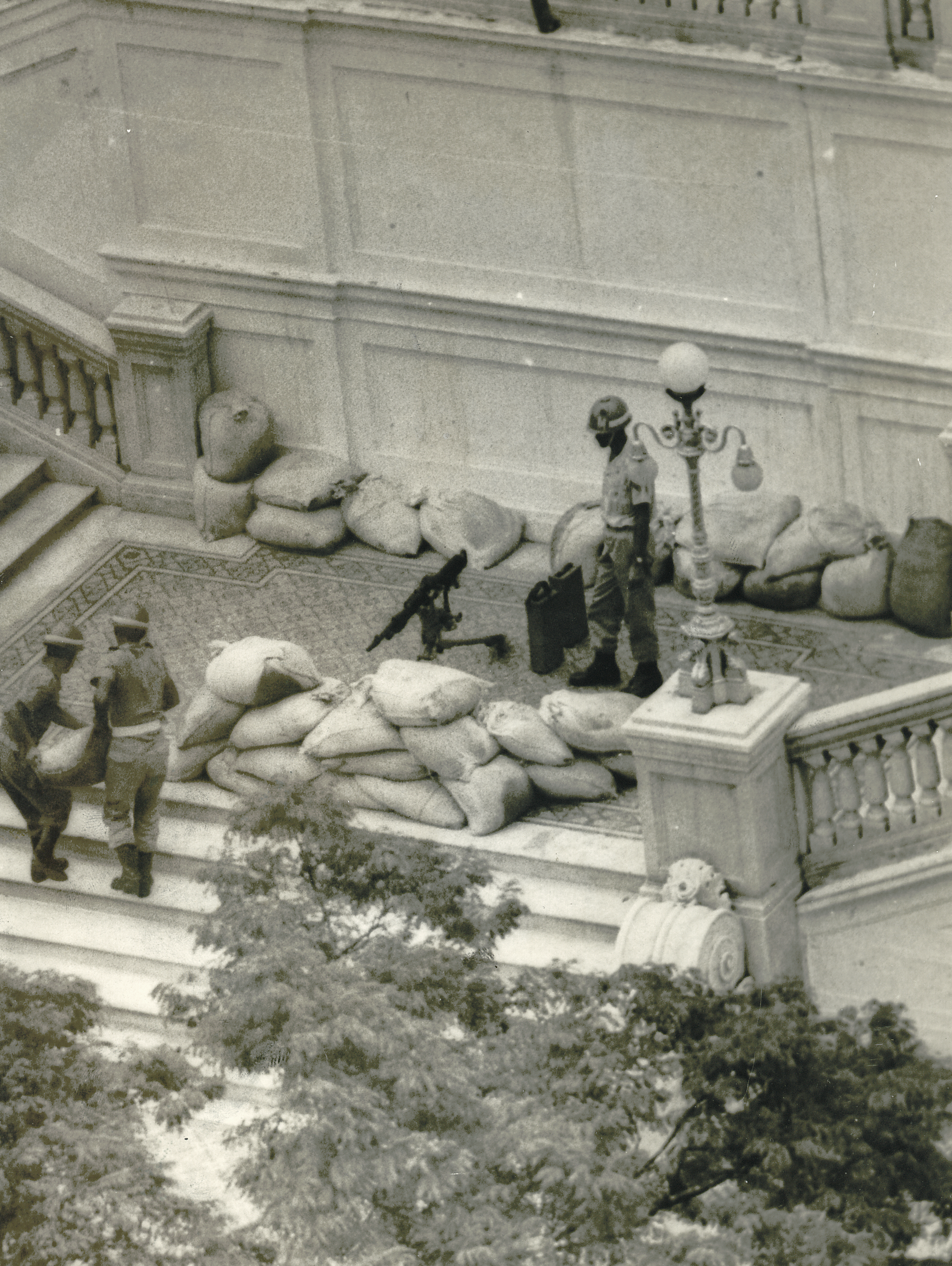
Military Police officers defending the Guanabara Palace

State governors were relevant for conferring civil legitimacy and commanding the Military Police.

At 2:00 am on the 1st, Ademar de Barros (PSP), governor of São Paulo, announced that six states were already rebelling against the federal government: São Paulo, Guanabara by Carlos Lacerda (UDN), Minas Gerais by Magalhães Pinto (UDN), Paraná by Ney Braga (PDC), Goiás by Mauro Borges (PSD) and Mato Grosso by Fernando Correia da Costa (UDN). Of these six, at least Ademar, Lacerda, and Magalhães were conspirators. Ademar was politically erratic, unwilling to risk military defeat, and refused to start the coup in his state, citing the example of the Constitutionalist Revolution. His accession came on the night of the 31st. Francisco Lacerda de Aguiar (PSD), from Espírito Santo, arranged his participation with Minas Gerais in March and confirmed it at 9:00 am on the 31st. Ney Braga was a conspirator, as was Ildo Meneghetti (PSD), from Rio Grande do Sul, and Luís de Sousa Cavalcanti (UDN), from Alagoas. (Note: Marshal Denys mentions his "valuable contribution" in Silva 2014a, p. 189. See also Costa, Rodrigo José da (2013). O golpe civil-militar em Alagoas: o governo Luiz Cavalcante e as lutas sociais (1961-1964) (PDF) (Thesis). Recife: UFPE., pp. 147-148.)

Aluízio Alves (PSD), from Rio Grande do Norte, Petrônio Portella, from Piauí, and Lomanto Júnior (PL), from Bahia, initially declared themselves in favor of the federal government and later turned back. Some overly eager officers wanted to overthrow Lomanto Júnior and Virgílio Távora (UDN), from Ceará, but the Fourth Army did not allow it. Pedro Gondim (PSD), from Paraíba, sided with the coup under military pressure. Plínio Coelho (PTB), from Amazonas, and Aurélio do Carmo (PSD), from Pará, were in Guanabara during the coup and supported the president. In the post-coup period, they retracted their positions but were removed from power. Badger da Silveira (PTB), from Rio de Janeiro, and José Augusto de Araújo (PTB), from Acre, also fell in this period. (Note: See Petit & Cuéllar 2012 and Queirós, César Augusto Bubolz (2019). "O golpe de 1964 no Amazonas e a deposição do governador Plínio Coelho". Antíteses. 11 (22). Londrina: 542–562. doi:10.5433/1984-3356.2019v12n23p542..) Miguel Arraes and Seixas Dória were targets since the beginning of the coup. Mauro Borges, despite his support for the coup, was removed in November 1964 through federal intervention by Castelo Branco.

=== Strikes and demonstrations ===
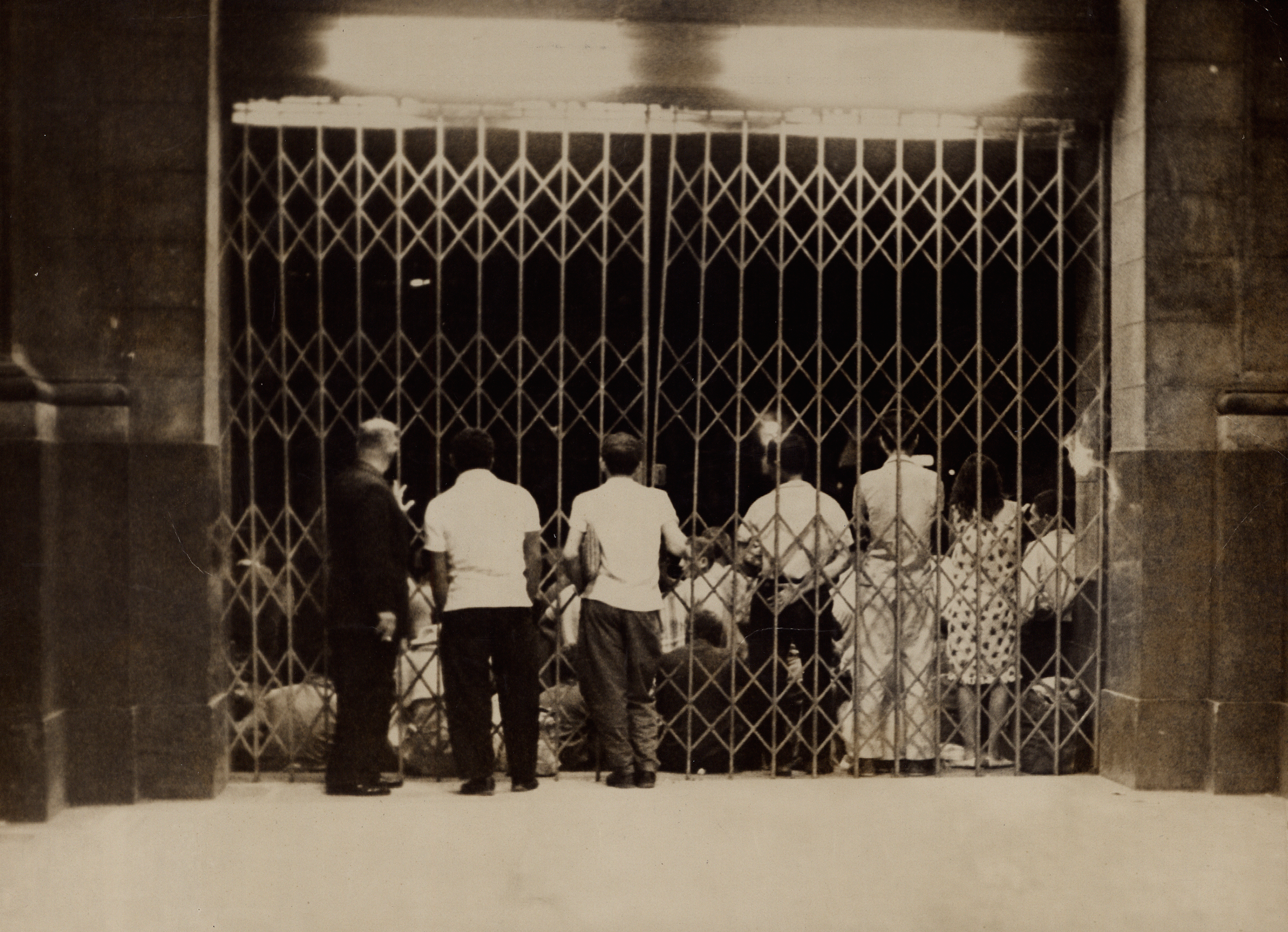
Strike at the Leopoldina train station

The UNE defended the general strike, and some students were waiting for weapons. Among the wider student population, some sectors supported the coup, reflecting middle-class sentiment. The CGT also called for a general strike, but it was disrupted on the 30th by the arrest of union leaders Carlos Lacerda's Department of Political and Social Order (DOPS). In Guanabara, the police offensive continued the following day. At the IAPTEC building, the police raid against the leaders was interrupted by the protection granted by the Third Air Zone and marines. Ports, trams and the trains at the Central and Leopoldina stations stopped. The paralysis of transport benefited the coup leaders, as it prevented the mobilization of pro-government workers from their homes to the city center. Goulart was against the general strike.

At the Companhia Siderúrgica Nacional, in Volta Redonda, management and the Army easily broke up the strike. In the Baixada Santista, there was a stoppage of the port and industry of Santos, the Cubatão refinery and the Companhia Siderúrgica Paulista, but the Army occupied the refinery on the night of the 31st. In the ABC region of São Paulo, the threat of a strike was suppressed. The trams in Porto Alegre were stopped, and in Santa Maria the union of railway workers went on strike, but had their leaders arrested. An early strike at the port of Recife was repressed by the Navy. The industrial zone of Rio Tinto, in Paraíba, was paralyzed. In Bahia, there was a strike at the Mataripe refinery.

According to Edmar Morel, the strike obstructed the loyalist movement in Rio de Janeiro while keeping São Paulo and Minas Gerais unharmed and was the work of a fifth column. Several authors question its effective implementation. Although it was not sufficient to preserve the president's term, its scale was nationwide.

In Porto Alegre, Brizola's second Legality Campaign found popular support and a crowd attended a rally by mayor Sereno Chaise. However, Brizola did not have the broad social base of the first Campaign nor its institutional support; on April 3 it came to an end and its leaders went into exile. As part of the new Campaign, Brizola resorted to radio speeches in a new Legality Chain. The radio chain strategy was also used by his enemies, who broadcast the Liberty Chain, in Minas Gerais, and Verde e Amarela Chain, in São Paulo. Throughout the country, the military dispersed several demonstrations against the coup, such as in Cinelândia, in Rio de Janeiro, in Recife, and on W3 Sul Avenue, in Brasília. Brizola's followers occupied city halls in Porto Alegre, Bagé and Uruguaiana. There were also favorable demonstrations. The Marches of the Family continued until June, now with a celebratory tone. The Victory March held in Rio de Janeiro was the biggest of the year.

== Regime transition ==
Ranieri Mazzilli passing the presidential sash to Castelo Branco

In the early hours of April 2, in a brief session of Congress, Senate president Auro de Moura Andrade declared Goulart's position vacant. This vacancy was not voted on, but only communicated. This gesture had no constitutional support. The legal ways to remove a president were impeachment, resignation, and vacancy if the president left the country, none of which had occurred. Goulart was on a flight from Brasília to Porto Alegre, and Congress was informed of his presence on Brazil's territory in a letter read out in session. At 03:45 Ranieri Mazzilli, president of the Chamber of Deputies and next in line of succession, was sworn in as president of Brazil. If Goulart were to reinstall his administration in Porto Alegre, there would be a dual government in the country, but he arrived in exile on April 4.

Congress attitude legitimized the coup, and the judiciary gave its approval for the appearance of the president of the STF at the inauguration. The press favorable to the coup, ignoring the circumstances of the vacancy, praised the constitutionality of the line of succession: the inauguration of Mazzilli followed by the indirect election of a president to end Goulart's term. (Note: See article 79 § 2 of the 1946 Constitution.) However, the de facto power was in the Supreme Command of the Revolution composed of general Costa e Silva, admiral Augusto Rademaker Grünewald and brigadier Francisco de Assis Correia de Melo.

While the "division of military booty" was taking place, with confused disputes over command nominations, Castelo Branco emerged as the likely next president, although opposed by Costa e Silva. The Institutional Act of April 9 anticipated the elections. Castelo Branco, preferred among officials, governors and parties, took office on the 15th and the Supreme Command ended its activities. AI-1 clarified that the "revolution" could have dissolved Congress and abolished the Constitution, but chose to preserve them with caveats.

In the days after the coup, thousands of arrests were made, affecting the leaders of important unions, the CGT, the Peasant Leagues and Popular Action. UNE had its headquarters occupied and then set on fire. There was intervention in universities. AI-1 then defined the guidelines for a purge carried out in the first years of the dictatorship, mostly in 1964. Its targets were "subversion and corruption", but the eradication of corruption seemed impossible to the government. 70% of unions with more than 1,000 members were intervened. The lists and inquiries reached politicians, especially those linked to the ousted president, 1,530 civil servants, and 1,228 military personnel, including 24 of the 91 generals. To ensure the cohesion of the Armed Forces, the "purification" also reached the lower echelons.

=== International repercussion ===
LBJ receives a briefing on Brazil.
Lyndon B. Johnson receiving a briefing on events in Brazil on March 31, 1964, on his Texas ranch with Undersecretary of State George Ball and Assistant Secretary for Latin America, Thomas C. Mann. Ball briefs Johnson on the status of military moves in Brazil to overthrow the government of João Goulart.

The American government recognized Mazzilli's inauguration on the night of the 2nd, which was a reason for internal and international perplexity due to the precocity of the act. The State Department and the Brazilian Ministry of Foreign Affairs (Itamaraty) acted to achieve international recognition for the new Brazilian government. It was quickly achieved in most of Latin America, while European governments doubted the American version but considered that the problem was not theirs.

In the American press, Time welcomed the "revolution", as did the New York Times, although it also covered its authoritarian character. There was also condemnation; in Italy, the view of Goulart as a center-left reformist overthrown with the help of the United States circulated. In France, the positioning of the newspapers bothered Itamaraty: for the correspondents of Le Monde and Le Figaro, what happened was a "reaction of the right against the social advances proposed by the left" and the communist label was being applied generically to the opponents.

== Effects on the dictatorship ==
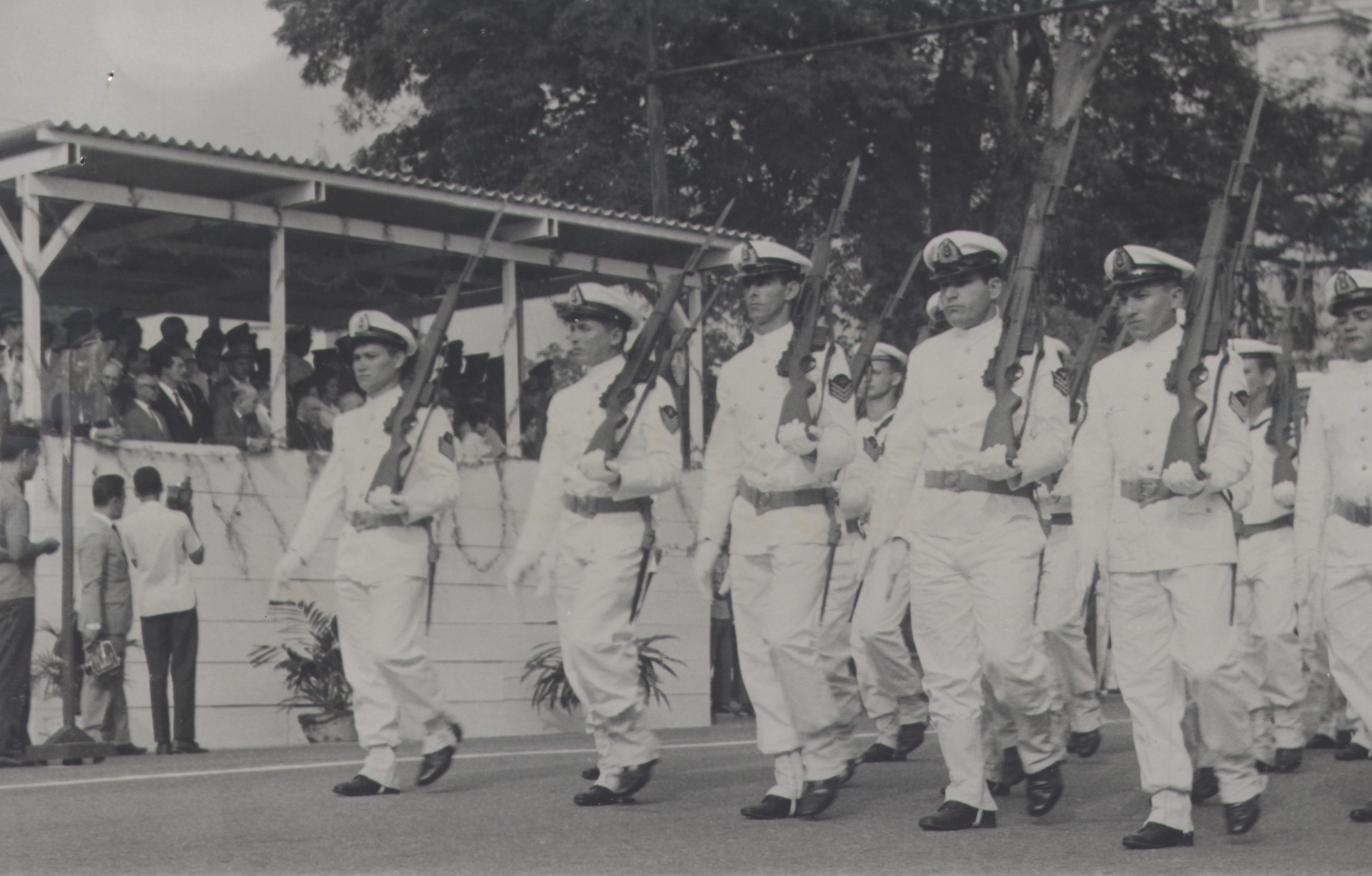
Parade for the first anniversary of the coup in 1965

Castelo Branco's government institutionalized the beginning of a prolonged dictatorship, which was unexpected by the Brazilian political class. A succession of military presidents continued until redemocratization and the New Republic of 1985. Military and civil sectors set up a new political system with an authoritarian character and its own legal framework, development ambition and systems of surveillance, censorship and political repression. The "new revolutionary outbreaks" or "reactivations of the revolution", with the imposition of new rules to the political game, as in the Institutional Acts, occurred several times and their possibility remained open until the end of the period.

The dictatorship's five presidents all had some participation in the coup. In addition to the roles of Castelo Branco (1964–1967), Costa e Silva (1967–1969) and Médici (1969–1974), Ernesto Geisel (1974–1979) was together with Castelo Branco at EME and later at his HQ, while João Figueiredo (1979–1985) was at ECEME and provided the officers used in the takeover of the Coast Artillery HQ. All five declared themselves heirs to the "Revolution of 1964". Many other officers wrote memoirs extolling their own role in the coup, even those who only joined when the outcome was already clear or acted reactively rather than actively.

There was no precise state project among the coup leaders, with the exception of the ESG-trained vanguard and their civilian allies. From the beginning, fissures appeared in the coalition that ousted Jango. Its participants ranged from opposition to the authoritarianism of the new regime to the "hard-liner" insistence that the purge should go deeper. The vanguard lost space with the inauguration of Costa e Silva and the rise of hard-line officers, but the ESG's objectives were not defeated.

Not all of the protagonists of the coup went on to further political success. From the beginning, Minas Gerais coup leaders were sidelined by their counterparts in Rio de Janeiro and São Paulo: Magalhães Pinto saw his ambition to become president in 1965 frustrated, while Mourão Filho was appointed to the Superior Military Court, where he had no political relevance. In São Paulo, Ademar de Barros and Kruel, allied with Justino, participated in a failed counter-coup plan against Castelo Branco. Carlos Lacerda joined his former enemies, JK and Goulart, in a Broad Front against the dictatorship and was eventually impeached.

The paradigm of base reforms gave way to that of "conservative modernization". There was a radical transformation in the economy, an increase in income concentration, the economic miracle from 1968 to 1973 and the serious economic crisis in the 1980s. In agrarian policy, measures were proposed that were heavily criticized by large landowners, but what was consolidated was the maintenance of land concentration. Economic policy reflected the predominance of IPES associates in the Ministries of Finance and Planning, the DSN's ideal of Brazil as a great power, the pre-coup debate between structuralist and liberal economists, and the political needs of the moment— "legitimacy by effectiveness". The great expansion of the public sector in the period was considered a betrayal of the ideals of 1964 by some businessmen.

The new regime was marked by the military's nationalism, including nationalism as defined by the ESG and DSN. The ESG's economic and geopolitical thinking was contrary to that of the self-styled nationalist military faction during the Fourth Republic; these officers, in turn, labeled the ESG faction "''entreguistas''", implying they would give away national resources to international capital. (Note: "Entreguismo" was a term created by nationalists to ridicule the ones who wanted an alliance with the United States. Nationalists claims the "entreguista" individuals aimed to "deliver" or "give" the best resources in the country to the exploration of the foreign capital. Skidmore, Politics in Brazil, 106.) In the Geisel government, nationalism and accusations of entreguismo were controversial terms in disputes within the dictatorship's power bloc.

Brazil's relations with the United States had been controversial among the military since at least the 1950s. As late as 1962, Lincoln Gordon noted the Brazilian military as favorable to the U.S. Castelo Branco aligned the country with Washington and was reciprocated with considerable American support. During his government there was also openness to international capital. Subsequently, there was a cooling of bilateral relations throughout the dictatorship, reaching a period of crisis during the Geisel government. Castelo Branco's relationship with the U.S. was criticized by hard-line officials, among whom there was a certain amount of anti-Americanism. With the socialist bloc, relations with Cuba were soon severed, but relations with the Soviet Union, re-established by Jango, continued. Despite American dominance, the dictatorship also cultivated economic relations with the Soviets.

In the radical left, the implantation of the dictatorship was seen as a confirmation of their critique of the PCB's multiple-stage path to socialism. This was important for the beginning of a leftist armed struggle for power. However, the causality isn't pure, as the idea of armed struggle was already discussed before the coup, as demonstrated by the guerrilla project linked to the Peasant Leagues, and it is possible that some movement would have emerged even without the dictatorship. (Note: Sales 2005, pp. 150–151, and Angelo, Vitor Amorim de (2011). Ditadura militar, esquerda armada e memória social no Brasil (PDF) (Thesis). São Carlos: UFSCar.. p. 189-193.)

== See also ==
- Goulart family lawsuit against the US
- Operation Condor
