= 1964 vacancy in the Presidency of Brazil =

Removal of President João Goulart

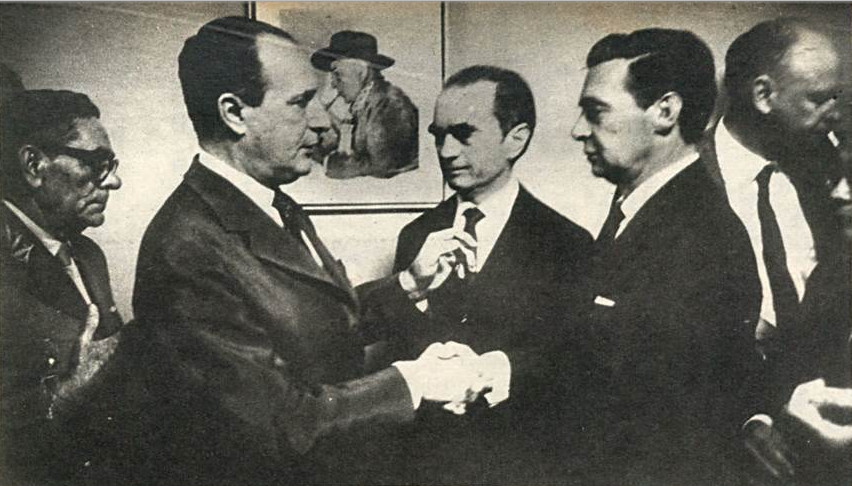
- Auro de Moura Andrade (right) swears in Ranieri Mazzilli (left) as President of Brazil after the declaration of vacancy in the presidency
- Native name: Vacância da Presidência do Brasil em 1964
- Date: April 2, 1964 (62 years ago)
- Location: Brazilian National Congress
- Also known as: Overthrow of João Goulart
- Type: Unconstitutional removal of a president
- Outcome: Overthrow of João Goulart; Inauguration of Ranieri Mazzilli; 1964 Brazilian presidential election; Start of Military dictatorship in Brazil

With the 1964 Brazilian coup d'état, on April 2 the National Congress of Brazil declared the presidency of the Republic occupied by João Goulart vacant. Since the vacancy was foreseen for the president's departure from the country without the authorization of Congress, which was not the case, the act had no constitutional support. However, it formalized the coup, transferring the position to the president of the Chamber of Deputies, Ranieri Mazzilli, until the indirect election of General Castelo Branco, the first military president of the dictatorship (1964-1985), days later.

The Executive and Legislative branches had clashed in Goulart's government, which failed to pass its base reforms in Congress and in its final stages governed without a parliamentary majority. Some congressmen participated in the conspiracy against his government, such as Auro de Moura Andrade, president of the Federal Senate. With the beginning of the coup, General Nicolau Fico, the army commander in Brasília, had to choose between garrisoning Congress and policing the city, as Auro wished, or not offering this support, as Goulart and Darcy Ribeiro, the head of the President's Civil Cabinet, wanted. The president was in the city on the 1st, but in the evening he went to Porto Alegre, in Rio Grande do Sul.

When he left, General Fico had sided with the President of the Senate and Congress had been summoned to a joint session. The 1946 Brazilian Constitution defined three forms of removal of the President of the Republic: resignation, which did not occur, impeachment, for which the opposition would not have the votes, and vacancy after unauthorized departure from the country. Although Goulart's whereabouts were communicated to the parliamentarians, Auro de Moura Andrade declared the presidency vacant and quickly closed the tumultuous early morning session. With the acquiescence of the Judiciary, Ranieri Mazzilli was sworn in at 03:45 am. His inauguration and a subsequent indirect election were provided for by law, but not the vacancy under those conditions. Meanwhile, on April 2 Goulart still had some power in Porto Alegre, which could even lead to duality of government, but he did not want the conflict and went to the interior of the state. Only on April 4 did he leave the country, heading for Uruguay.

The declaration of the vacancy occurred as Goulart's government collapsed with the coup and it was the participation of Congress that was important in its outcome to confer legitimacy on it, but in the new balance of power Congress fell short of the military. In 2013 Congress symbolically annulled the session.

== Goulart's relationship with Congress ==
Mazzilli hands the presidential sash to Goulart in 1961

The political system in the Populist Republic was dominated by three parties, the Social Democratic Party (PSD), the National Democratic Union (UDN) and the Brazilian Labor Party (PTB). PSD and PTB were allied for most of this period. President Goulart was from the PTB, which had 28.4% of the seats in the Chamber in the 1962 legislative elections, and thus depended on the PSD, with 28.9%; however, he ended up governing without a majority, just like his predecessor, Jânio Quadros, who also did not make it to the end of his term. The PSD, a mediating force located in the center, destabilized the system when it ceased to balance it: from 1963 on, he was on the side of the UDN opposition, being "faithful of the balance" in the fall of the president.

Goulart's government was marked by conflicts between the Executive and Legislative branches. Due to the great polarization, few projects were approved in the Legislative, including proposals from the Executive. The number of actors with veto power, including the two parliamentary fronts (Nationalist Parliamentary Front and Parliamentary Democratic Action), was high, preventing changes from taking place.

The president got legislative support to bring forward the referendum on presidentialism, regaining the powers lost to the parliamentary republic, but Congress overturned a constitutional amendment for land reform in May 1963. Land reform would be one of the basic reforms, the PTB's ambition. With the loss of support for the president in Congress and the PSD's swing to the right, it became difficult to carry out the reforms through it. This is attributed both to the president's political incapacity, as done by politicians at the time and later authors (Elio Gaspari and Marco Antonio Villa), and, conversely, to the social conflict of the moment making it impossible to build support in Congress. The basic reforms are also accused, as by Wanderley Guilherme dos Santos, of being, except for the agrarian one, obscure and unclear, only exposed in the presidential message to Congress in 1964, with little initiative taken by the president. However, they had been discussed in society since before Goulart's government. The controversy was that they benefited and harmed certain sectors of society.

Candidates opposed to the reforms advocated by the left were financed by the Brazilian Institute for Democratic Action, with foreign financial involvement, in the 1962 elections. Members of the UDN and PSD participated in the conspiracies that would lead to the coup of 1964. The request for a state of siege in November 1963 was rejected by the left and right and defeated by the parliamentarians, demonstrating the president's isolation. In the last moments of his government, as in the Central Rally, the president, as desired by the left, abandoned conciliation and sought to mobilize popular pressure to get the reforms from Congress, thus alarming conservative congressmen.

== Brasília during the coup d'état ==
=== Military situation in the Central Plateau ===
On March 31, 1964, the 4th Military Region, in Minas Gerais, went into revolt against the government and started an offensive towards the former capital in Guanabara. At midnight the Second Army, from São Paulo, joined the coup and also advanced against Rio de Janeiro. Both the Second Army and the 4th Military Region also ordered operations against the new capital. The 16th Light Infantry Battalion, a Second Army unit based in Cuiabá, entered Goiás by road and air transport. In Brasília the Military Command and the 11th Military Region, headed by General Nicolau Fico, were in a confused situation, with many officers rejecting the government's authority. The 4th Company of the Presidential Guard Battalion (BGP) left Brasília to defend the Goiás/Minas border. As the border was still unoccupied, the 10th Battalion of the Military Police of Minas Gerais was hurriedly transferred to prevent the BGP from entering Minas Gerais territory. Later on April 1, knowing that the First Army, in Rio de Janeiro, had joined the coup, the BGP retreated. Subsequently, reinforcements from the Minas Gerais police and Army converged on Brasília.

=== Congress status ===
Auro de Moura Andrade published a manifesto breaking the Senate from the government and calling for the Armed Forces to intervene in the political process. However, on the night of the 31st he protested in the plenary: the coming and going of parliamentarians was impossible with the blocking of the airport and highways. Radio and television were under censorship and he could not address the nation: the chief of police in the Federal District had seized the videotape of his speech. The transfer of the Congress to another city was under consideration: Mauro Borges, governor of Goiás, offered Goiânia, and on the 30th Deputy Herbert Levy had talked about a transfer to São Paulo or Belo Horizonte. In Congress, "the stage for harsh, vehement dialogues, congressmen anxiously followed the news of the adhesion of General Amaury Kruel, commander of the Second Army. Congressman Francisco Julião claimed to have 60,000 armed men from the Peasant Leagues willing to defend the government, which was nothing but bravado, but it intimidated the congressmen.

Auro's greatest fear was about the agglomeration at the Teatro Experimental de Brasília, which, it was said, would attack the deputies' apartments. So he requested an army presence around the Congress and in the city, but he was not granted. In the Theater, Darcy Ribeiro, head of Goulart's Civil Cabinet, had organized about a thousand candangos on the morning of the 1st to, according to him, peacefully occupy the Chamber and Senate on the following day. Elio Gaspari also registers the participation of the Grupos dos Onze in the organization and that they could be the starting point for a popular militia; they informed name, address and profession, were registered by the Civil Servants Union and were to receive on the following day, in a rural colonization nucleus, weapons and instructions. In another moment, the head of the Civil Cabinet handed weapons and a list of politicians to be arrested or executed (depending on the version), among them the presidents of the Supreme Court (STF) and Senate, to two leaders of the Communist Party. They refused the act, considering it terrorism.

Goulart arrived in Brasília on the 1st from Rio de Janeiro, but flew to Porto Alegre at night. In Brasília he was isolated and under military risk. General Fico swore loyalty, although it was doubtful. The president's allies predicted an impeachment attempt in Congress; congressman Tancredo Neves imagined a situation equivalent to that of presidents Café Filho and Carlos Luz. They considered it essential, in order to avoid it, that the security of Congress should remain with the police, without the Army going out into the streets; the Army's presence would stimulate Congress to act against the President of the Republic. Thus, General Fico was supposed to collaborate. However, on their way back from the airport they found the Esplanade of the Ministries occupied by the Army, which had ignored Jango's wishes and started carrying out the order of the Senate President. Congress was illuminated: "The process of parliamentary struggle had begun."

== The statement at the Congress ==
=== Legal aspects ===
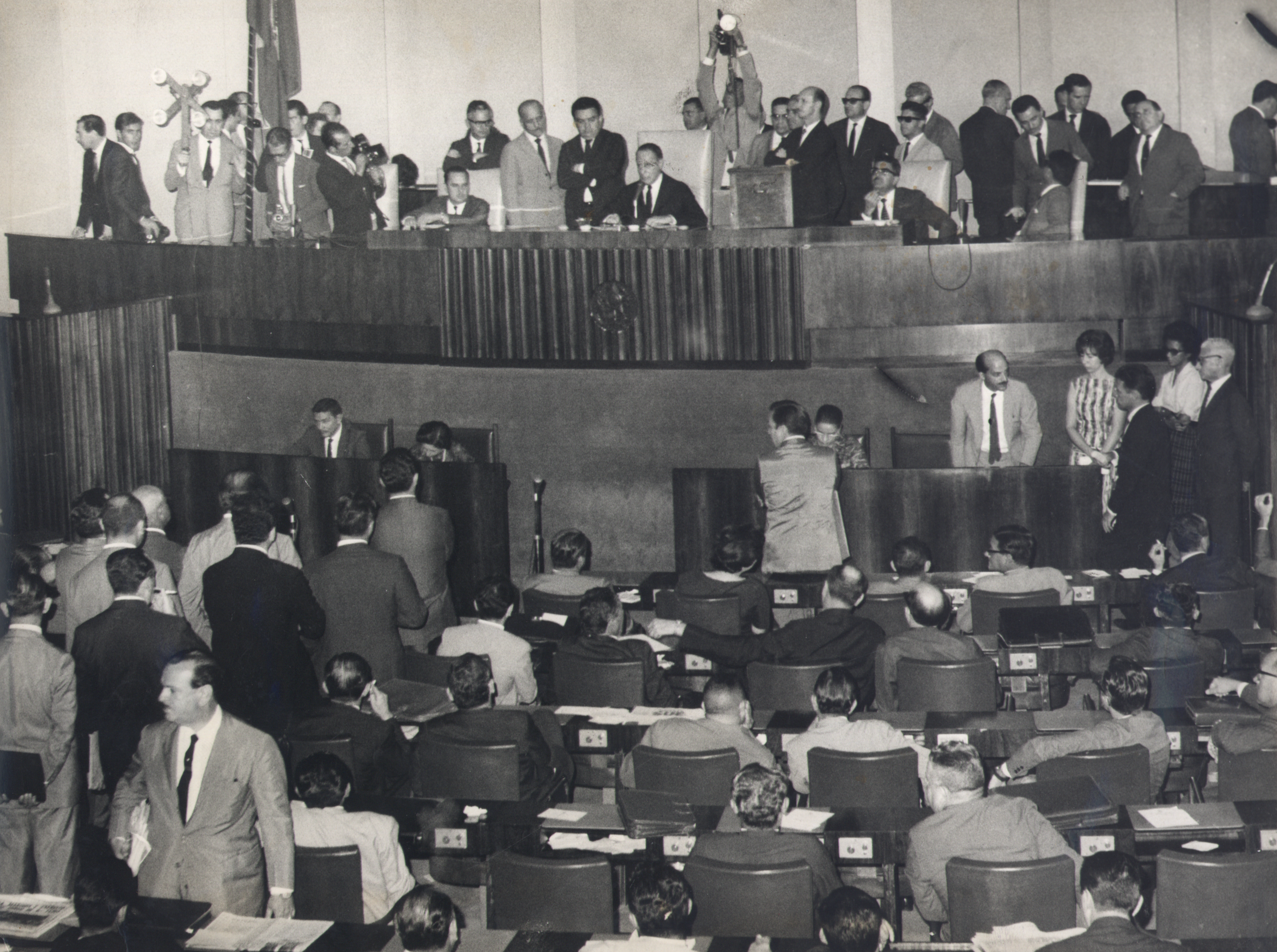
Ranieri Mazzilli elected to the presidency of the Chamber before the coup

Under the 1946 Constitution, there were three ways to remove the president of the Republic: impeachment, resignation or, according to art. 85,

The President and the Vice-President of the Republic cannot leave the country without the permission of the National Congress, under penalty of losing their office.

Goulart did not resign and the opposition knew it did not have the votes necessary for an impeachment. PTB was prepared for impeachment and could prevent or delay it within the Rules of Procedure, if necessary for lack of a quorum. Likewise, during the Congress session in the early morning of the 2nd, a communiqué was read informing of the president's presence in Porto Alegre (in reality he was flying from Brasília to Porto Alegre). After Goulart left Porto Alegre, Mayor Sereno Chaise declared in the afternoon that he had left the country, but Goulart was on his farms in Rio Grande do Sul until April 4, and only then did he go into exile in Uruguay. The congressmen had no patience to wait for the president to leave the country, and so the vacancy was declared without constitutional basis: Goulart not only remained on national territory, but also informed Congress of this fact.

The line of presidential succession was the president of the Republic, vice-president and president of the Chamber of Deputies. The president of the Republic elected in 1960, Jânio Quadros, had resigned in 1961. Goulart was the vice-president of the 1960 election and was sworn in after the Legality Campaign. The president of the Chamber was Ranieri Mazzilli. Thus, once the vacancy was declared, power was transferred to Mazzilli, obeying the line of succession defined in article 79. The pro-coup press praised the constitutionality of the succession, but did not consider the conditions under which the vacancy was declared, taking it for granted.

=== Joint session ===
Around midnight, Auro de Moura Andrade was meeting with the leaders of the PSD and UDN, and Tancredo Neves suspected that they were plotting Goulart's deposition. Suspecting that he would be declared in an uncertain place or outside the country, Waldir Pires drafted an official letter, to be signed by Darcy Ribeiro, clarifying the president's whereabouts. A joint session of the National Congress began, attended by 212 congressmen (29 senators and 183 deputies). Due to the tumult, it was suspended for 20 minutes. It was during the suspension that Pedro Aleixo allegedly, Tancredo Neves was informed, suggested a summary coup, making the statement and suspending the session. When the session was reopened, Auro declared that Goulart had left the government. At the insistence of the governing bench, he allowed the reading of the letter signed by Darcy Ribeiro:

The President of the Republic has asked me to inform Your Excellency that, due to the national events of the last few hours, in order to preserve the mandate given to him by the people from criminal act, investing him as Head of the Executive Power, he has decided to travel to Rio Grande do Sul, where he and his Ministry are at the head of the legalistic military troops and in the full exercise of their constitutional powers.

Without answering this, Auro continued:

Mr. President of the Republic left the seat of government... left the Nation acephalous in a very serious hour of Brazilian life in which it is necessary that the Head of State remains at the head of his Government.

Mr. President of the Republic has abandoned the government. The acefalia continues. There is a need for the National Congress, as the civil power, to immediately take the attitude that is its responsibility, under the terms of the Constitution, in order to restore, in this troubled country, the authority of the Government, the existence of the Government. We cannot allow Brazil to be without Government, abandoned.

It is the Bureau that is responsible for the fate of Brazil's hard-pressed population.

Therefore, I declare the Presidency of the Republic vacant and, according to the terms of Article 79 of the Federal Constitution, the President of the Chamber of Deputies, Mr. Ranieri Mazzilli, takes office.

The session ended at 03:00 in the morning. Auro closed the session, turning off the speaker and the lights in the Plenary. The atmosphere had been heavy, with both cheers and protests and turmoil. The vacancy decree was not voted on by the parliamentarians, but only communicated by the president of the Senate. The allied base tried to obstruct this declaration, and, under great uproar, tried to reopen the session. Despite having a few MPs of great physical vigor forming a personal safety device, Auro was slapped by deputy Rogê Ferreira, but managed to quickly get out to Ranieri Mazzilli's office.

Fearing a crowd at the bus station and lacking full confidence in the Army, Congress had on hand, on loan from Mauro Borges, three machine guns at strategic points and some ammunition. Two military congressmen were working on security. Darcy Ribeiro also mentions the sending of goons by the Goias governor.

In 2013, Congress annulled the session on a symbolic basis.

=== Relevance ===
Auro de Moura Andrade, Senate president

Auro de Moura Andrade's declaration of the vacancy of Goulart's office was made when the disintegration of the government was perceptible. Before the statement, Deputy Pedro Aleixo said that the attitude was expected by the military. It is referred to as a precipitation of events, with the deposition of Goulart; the Legislative's strategic participation in the coup; the consummation of the coup; and a legitimate-looking outcome. It was important to give legitimacy to the new regime in the face of public opinion. On the other hand, the first Institutional Act (AI), days later, explicitly denied that Congress gave legitimacy to the "Revolution" because, in its words, "the victorious revolution (...) legitimizes itself" and "the constitutional processes did not work to unseat the government"; the Act recognized the break with the previous normativity, and the "Revolution" was not restricted by it. (Note: It is thus quite clear that the revolution does not seek to legitimize itself through Congress. It is this Institutional Act, resulting from the exercise of the Constituent Power, inherent to all revolutions, that legitimizes it.)

Statements from military personnel recognize the lack of Congressional obstacles to the deposition of the president and its role in institutionalizing the coup, but while some evaluate positively the motivations of the congressmen, for others they were opportunistic. Most congressmen justified the measure as a way to restore public order and defend the democratic regime from a socialist revolution or from carrying out base reforms without the consent of Congress. For them, the president of the Senate was only complying with the Constitution, and this compliance gave a democratic character to his action. According to Senator Wilson Gonçalves, "there was abandonment - a fact. It was not our place, because we are judges, to investigate the causes of the fact. We would have to take the fact and look for it, in an effort to save Democracy, in an effort to reestablish the absolute and full rule of our Constitution". However, congressmen from the PTB and the Nationalist Parliamentary Front denounced the act, such as Senator Oscar Passos, for whom the session was conducted in a "brutal, illegal and violent" way.

For months before the coup, Auro de Moura Andrade participated in the conspiratorial group of Marshal Cordeiro de Farias and São Paulo Governor Ademar de Barros. In his memoirs, he justified his action at the time of the coup: "no nation can sleep without a president"; "What I needed was to dismiss the president, in order to liberate the III Army and relieve it from fighting against those who had risen up in defense of constitutional integrity". On April 2, the Third Army's adhesion to the coup was still incomplete. Auro also had a personal motive: in July 1962, during the parliamentary regime, the president nominated him as Prime Minister, under the condition that he kept a letter of resignation. Two days later, while Auro was concluding the negotiations for his ministry, Goulart used this letter to remove him from his post.

The course of events up to Castelo Branco's inauguration was remarkably similar to that envisaged in a 1963 American contingency plan: Goulart would be "persuaded" to step aside and Ranieri Mazzilli would occupy his position until the election of a new president by Congress. This was the third hypothesis of the plan. The second envisaged the formation of an "alternative provisional government" that could request American support, especially logistical, in a conflict with the Jango supporters. This provisional government is associated both with the administration that emerged from the action of Congress and the initiative of the governor of Minas Gerais, Magalhães Pinto, who appointed Afonso Arinos as secretary of government to obtain recognition abroad of a state of belligerency. (Note: See also Brazil–United States relations during the João Goulart government#The plans and Operation Brother Sam#Provisional government and state of belligerency.)

== Presidential succession ==
=== Mazzilli's inauguration ===
Darcy Ribeiro planned to prevent the inauguration by isolating Congress, cutting off the water and electricity, and preventing the motorcade from entering the Planalto Palace, but the few remaining legalist military were too indecisive. Ranieri Mazzilli had "the smallest inauguration party of a president in the republican history". With Auro and the president of the Supreme Court (STF), Justice Ribeiro da Costa, he drove in a few cars to the Palace. Four armed deputies served as security. The president of the STF represented there the approval of the judiciary to the coup, although the STF did not conspire against Goulart or actively participate in his overthrow. The Planalto was dark, and a deputy climbed the stairs by the light of matches. Two others searched the building, where some ushers were sleeping in their armchairs, and managed to get one to open the doors. The inauguration took place at 03:45 am, on the third floor, with some deputies present.

A member of the entourage suggested the presence of a general. The one found, by telephone, was General André Fernandes, without command or prestige. General Fico had been invited, but was undecided. He was found on the fourth floor, in the company of Waldir Pires and Darcy Ribeiro. Three deputies went up to convince him to participate, but he would not come down. A tense argument arose between Fico and Darcy Ribeiro about his loyalty, since he was already taking orders from General Costa e Silva, who had taken over the Ministry of War in Rio de Janeiro. Darcy called him a "monkey traitor". (Note: Faria 2013, p. 452, situates this confrontation before the session in Congress.) He and Waldir Pires, the last representatives of janguism in the Planalto, left by private elevator. Mazzilli began his government in Brasília, but power was concentrated in the military constituted in the Supreme Command of the Revolution in Rio de Janeiro.

=== Castelo Branco's election ===
Mazzilli hands over the presidential sash to Castelo Branco

Upon arriving in Rio Grande do Sul, Goulart intended to reinstall his government in Porto Alegre, which would set up a dual government in Brazil. The loyalist civilians were mobilized in the city and the Third Army command was legalistic, but the loyalist troops were still few, a military defeat was imminent and Jango did not want bloodshed. So at 11:30 am on the 2nd he left the city, headed for São Borja, and then on to Uruguay.

Mazzilli's term of office was temporary. The Constitution provided:

Art. 79 § 2º - When the offices of President and Vice-President of the Republic become vacant, elections shall be held sixty days after the last vacancy occurs. If the vacancies occur in the second half of the presidential term, the election for both positions will be held thirty days after the last vacancy, by the National Congress, in the manner established by law. In either case, those elected shall complete the term of their predecessors.

AI-1, granted by the Supreme Command of the Revolution on April 9, anticipated the choice of the new president to two days later. The indirect election determined General Castelo Branco as the successor. The Act strengthened the Executive Branch to the detriment of the Legislative Branch and defined the guidelines for purging the civil service and the legislatures. It expressed the supremacy of the military over Congress, since its implementation ignored a more limited law proposed by PSD and UDN congressmen. The preamble of the Act defined that the dissolution of Congress was the prerogative of the unrestricted power of the "Revolution", but that it chose to retain it.
