= Brazil–United States relations during the João Goulart government =

Relationships between the United States and Brazil detreeating from 1961 to 1964

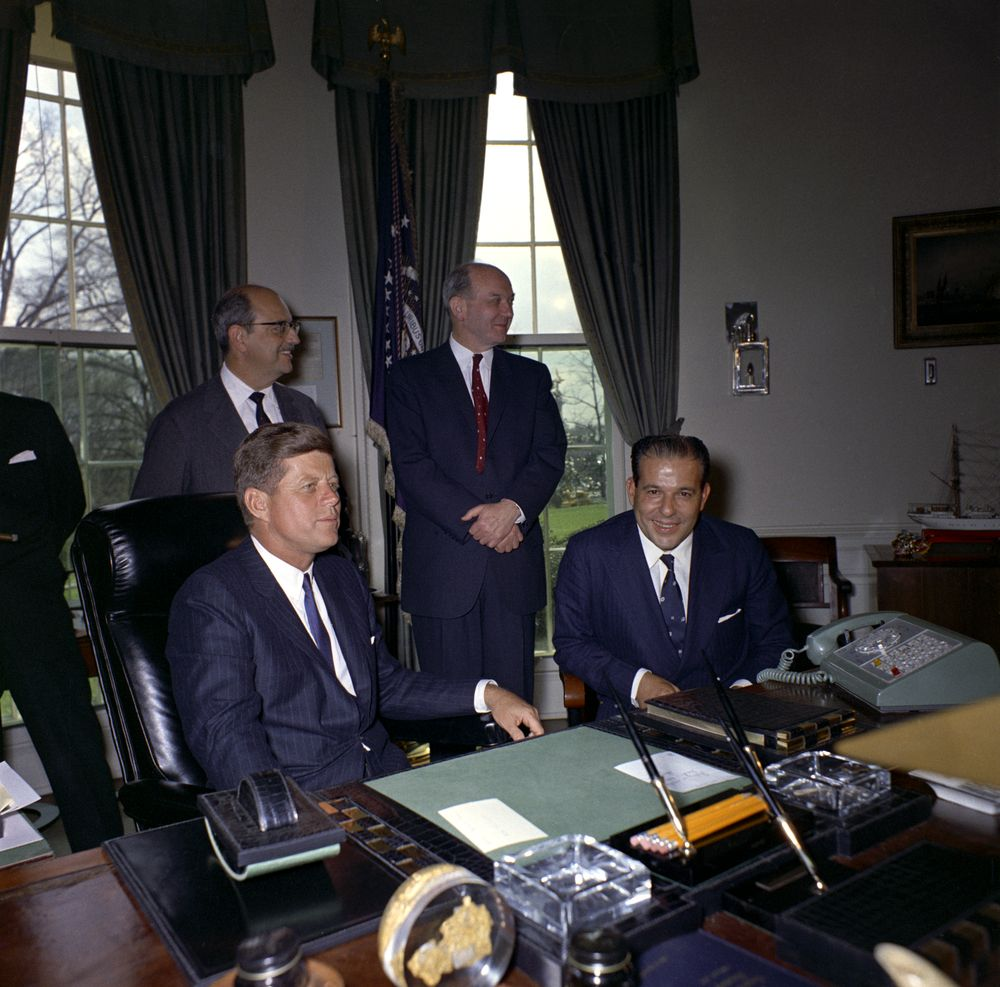
Goulart meeting with Kennedy at White House on April 3, 1962.

Brazil–United States relations during the presidency of João Goulart (1961–1964) gradually deteriorated, culminating in American support for the ousting of Goulart in the 1964 coup d'état in Brazil. Although the crisis' dynamics were primarily Brazilian, American actions progressively increased the chances of the occurrence and success of a rebellion against the government. Historians differ on the inevitability of a clash between the Goulart and John F. Kennedy/Lyndon B. Johnson administrations, the relative importance of the attrition points, and the timing the U.S. government's decision to support the Goulart's ousting - earlier, as in 1962, or later, only in 1963.

Jango, as the Brazilian president was known, took office already distrustful of the Americans because of his connections with the radical left in the unions, although he was not considered a communist. Even so, the year 1962 did not start out negative, and Goulart managed to have a good relationship with Kennedy. There were several points of attrition. Internationally, the Brazilian government continued its Independent Foreign Policy, expanding its ties outside the Western bloc and disagreeing in part with the American proposals against Cuba. Domestically, it paid less attention to economic stabilization and limited the remittance of profits from American companies in Brazil. In 1963, Goulart made concessions and an attempt at stabilization, the Triennial Plan, but did not find the necessary American support for its success and hardened his position with the U.S. In Washington there was also concern about leftist forces such as governor Leonel Brizola, who took over subsidiaries of American companies, and the Peasant Leagues.

The U.S. used several instruments to alter the course of the Brazilian government and subsequently to weaken it. Kennedy's visit to Brazil was successively postponed, while opposition candidates in Brazil received millions of dollars in the 1962 elections and economic assistance was redirected to opposition state governments, the "islands of administrative sanity". The U.S. Embassy in Brazil, under Lincoln Gordon, became involved in Brazil's internal affairs. The important release of credit was hindered, different from the attitude taken for the previous government of Jânio Quadros. Finally, the U.S. government sought allies among the Brazilian military, who were already plotting a coup d'état and offered support for their military operations in the form of Operation Brother Sam. It never reached Brazil due to the rapid deposition of Goulart beginning on March 31, 1964, but the withdrawal of the president was in part due to the knowledge that the U.S. State Department would recognize a parallel government organized by the insurgents. The Brazilian military dictatorship (1964–1985) was quickly recognized, and the U.S. acted diplomatically to facilitate its recognition by other countries.

The pressure on Goulart's government occurred when American foreign policy was defined by the Cold War, the Cuban Revolution of 1959, and pressure within the country for a tough foreign policy, Washington sought to reassert its hegemony. In Latin America, it tried to influence leftist governments through economic assistance from the Alliance for Progress or to favor their overthrow by local opposition, thus tolerating several military coups.

== Context ==
=== U.S. domestic conditions ===
Internal conditions in the United States throughout the 1950s and early 1960s made it more difficult for the country to coexist peacefully with left and center-left governments in Latin America. If the U.S. president was too favorable to Goulart, he would fuel criticism from his internal enemies. The period was marked by "a national security state, high defense spending, militarization, and social conformism". The Cold War and paranoia about communism were intensifying. Trade unionism followed a shift to the right. Congress was dominated by the Democratic Party. Even if typically perceived as more moderate in foreign policy than the Republican Party, it was aggressive at the time, especially due to the great influence of conservative and militaristic representatives from the American South.

In the 1960 presidential election, Democrat John F. Kennedy narrowly defeated his opponent, Republican Richard Nixon, and to do so he had to be tougher on foreign policy. After Kennedy's assassination in 1963, Lyndon B. Johnson took over. By 1964 the new president was worried about the election and would not accept the political damage of supporting an unsuccessful coup in Brazil. In January the Republicans had criticized his reaction to the protests in Panama as lacking toughness.

=== U.S. Foreign Policy in Latin America ===
==== Until the Cuban Revolution ====
American foreign policy after World War II had global scope and the goals of organizing a world order and preventing the expansion of the Soviet Union's influence. The supporters of the realist school of international relations believed that a totalitarian regime like the Soviet Union would be aggressively expansionist. After communism was installed in a country, the restoration of capitalism and liberal democracy would be impossible. Thus, it sought to prevent the spread of communism through the containment policy. It also aimed at reasserting American hegemony.

In this context, Latin America was important as a source of raw materials and votes in the United Nations, as well as being the last region that could be relied upon in case Europe became anti-American. Realist theorists Hans Morgenthau and George Kennan believed in its relevance. However, in this early period of the Cold War (until 1959), little attention was paid to the region, and capital investment was minimal. There was a security system with a military component, the Inter-American Treaty of Reciprocal Assistance (TIAR), and a political component, the Organization of American States (OAS). Armaments were supplied, but this was of little military use - "supplying tanks to Honduras or Ecuador would probably not prevent the Soviet Union from launching a nuclear attack." Containment had two instruments: economic aid and destabilization. In the first case, one example is Bolivia after 1952, whose government, installed after a revolution, was influenced in a more conservative direction. In the latter, the overthrow of Jacobo Árbenz's government in Guatemala by a paramilitary force organized by the Central Intelligence Agency (CIA). Both were considered successful.

In 1958, the booing received by Vice President Nixon on a tour of several Latin American countries alerted the Eisenhower administration to the poor image of the U.S. in the region. The Cuban Revolution in 1959 and subsequent events led to a turnaround in Latin American politics. Attempts to achieve a moderate government, as late as 1959, failed. The following year, the quota on Cuban sugar exports was suspended. In his presidential campaign Kennedy criticized the American leadership's complacency with Latin America. In 1961 the military attempt to change the regime in Cuba, the Bay of Pigs invasion, failed, while Fidel Castro announced the implementation of socialism and his county's alignment with the Soviets. In 1962 the Cuban Missile Crisis tipped the balance of power in the region in favor of the United States, which allowed pressure to be put on reluctant countries such as Brazil.

==== Kennedy and Johnson administrations ====
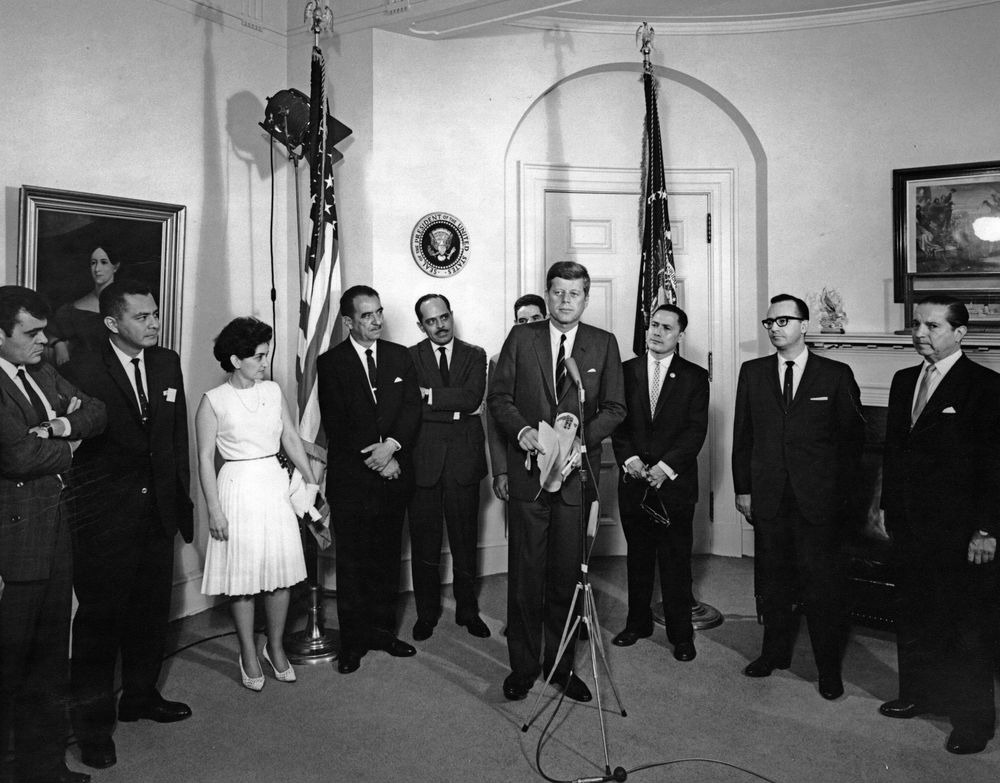
Kennedy with Latin American representatives of the Alliance for Progress in 1963

The perception was that Cuba had been lost, which led to a reformulation of foreign policy and "a stance of paranoid vigilance" against a "second Cuba" or "other Cubas". (Note: Fico 2008, p. 25 uses "other Cubas" as the target of military reformulation, and Lara 2019, p. 6, "no second Cuba" in the context of the Alliance for Progress.) Meanwhile, revolutionary movements that sought Soviet support were emerging. However, even leaders that came to power democratically, and even if not Marxist, but reformist or nationalist, were assumed as risks to the security and interests of the United States. Such were cases like Cheddi Jagan in Guyana, Árbenz in Guatemala, and João Goulart in Brazil. The loss in Cuba was on the minds of Johnson administration officials in 1964 and favored tougher decisions regarding Brazil.

The new policy had two pillars, the Latin American military and economic assistance. The local Armed Forces were seen as "the most stable and modernizing social organization." Since the last year of the Eisenhower administration there had been thoughts of making them smaller and focused on counterinsurgency, as if they were gendarmeries.

In turn, economic assistance came in the form of the Alliance for Progress, announced in 1961, with an investment forecast of $10 billion over ten years. Its administration was handed over to the newly created USAID. Based on Walt W. Rostow's modernization theory, it conceived poverty as an open space for unwanted ideologies, and economic development as the only way to prevent communist revolution. The Alliance's strategy was based on democratic reform, anti-communism and raising the standard of living. The latter would be achieved by economic planning, state and foreign investment, and social reforms, including land and tax reforms. It would be more than a common assistance program, reaching into political, economic and social structures, in a "revolution on the margins of capitalism" or "middle-class revolution". However, not all anti-communist right-wingers accepted issues such as land reform in Latin America, and so the U.S. acted against right-wing dictators Rafael Trujillo in the Dominican Republic and François Duvalier in Haiti.

However, from the Latin American perspective, this was nothing more than a common assistance program. Applying Cold War logic to interpret a region with its own characteristics and the function of the Alliance as a tool to fight it limited its ability to realize its ideology. Further, the stated goal of supporting democratic regimes failed, and the U.S. government used political, economic, and military tools to destabilize leftist rulers elected within democracy. Cold War logic took priority. As late as 1950, George Kennan wrote that "It is better to have a strong regime in power than a liberal government if it is indulgent and relaxed and penetrated by communists."

Military coups occurred in Argentina and Peru in 1962, and in Guatemala and Ecuador in 1963, and in all of them the U.S. attitude moved from near-reaction (even stopping economic assistance) to expectation, and finally acceptance of the newly installed authoritarian regimes. By the "Mann Doctrine," established in 1964, dictatorships would not be questioned if they maintained anti-communism. The goal of preventing new socialist or communist governments in the region, thought of from the beginning by the founders of the Alliance, was achieved.

Kennedy had a good image in Latin America. His successor was, as far as the region was concerned, less interested and more receptive to the opinions of American businessmen. He appointed Thomas C. Mann as the person responsible for Latin American affairs.

=== Influence on the thinking of the Brazilian military ===
The Brazilian Army in the 1960s had an American-style organization and military doctrine. (Note: See Pedrosa, Fernado Velôzo Gomes (2018). Modernização e reestruturação do Exército brasileiro (1960-1980) (Thesis) (in Brazilian Portuguese). Rio de Janeiro., pp. 104-105. As noted on p. 234, already at that time there was demand for a genuinely Brazilian doctrine, which in fact was built in the 1960s and 1970s.) Among the influences was the National Security Doctrine, disseminated from the US military to their Latin American peers and taught in military schools along the lines of the National War College. In the Brazilian case, it was the Escola Superior de Guerra (ESG), and its ideology advocated alignment with the U.S. However, the theories developed at ESG were not merely those received from the U.S., since the School synthesized already existing concepts of both Brazilian and foreign origins, among them American. The officers connected with it were prominent, but they comprised only one among several military tendencies. Besides the ESG, the military was also influenced through the Caribbean School or School of the Americas.

=== Relationship with Jânio Quadros' government ===
In the early 1960s, when Jânio Quadros took over the presidency, Brazil faced rising inflation and internal and external deficits. The foreign debt, although not as big (in 1960 it was equivalent to two years of exports), carried high short-term interest rates, and the country's ability to raise foreign exchange was declining. Due to heavy spending under Juscelino Kubitschek in the 1950s, now large loans from the U.S. or the International Monetary Fund (IMF) were needed to run the government, which tied the Brazilian policy cycle to the U.S. Treasury and opened space for American interference in the Brazilian administration. Obtaining these loans had obstacles: the American Congress wanted economic stabilization measures demanded by the IMF as a counterpart, and the Brazilian Independent Foreign Policy (PEI) was unwanted in Washington. Through this policy, Brazil defended non-intervention against Cuba, opposing American intentions. Economic stabilization, on the other hand, would typically consist of public spending cuts, export promotion through the exchange rate, credit restrictions, and wage adjustments. These measures were intended to address inflation and balance the external finances. In the short term they would be harmful, which made Brazilians reluctant.

The Brazilian government entered into negotiations with its creditors: the US, IMF, Europeans and the Japanese. It got more than US$1.6 billion in refinancing and new loans. In addition to providing 55% of these loans, the Americans pressured the other creditors to offer these favorable terms. However, at the end of July, when Quadros failed to comply with the austerity he had promised, the IMF suspended its loan, which had only been partially used up until then. The Europeans did the same. The Americans, however, maintained their support, and Kennedy invited Jânio to visit Washington in December. They not only relaxed their demands for an austere fiscal policy, but also did not undermine Jânio for his IEP. Kennedy accepted Jânio's argument that this policy had a tactical function, to gain domestic support, without causing "ideological contamination" of the Brazilian society. Jânio had an easier time getting his deals done than Getúlio Vargas or Juscelino in the 1950s.

== American interpretation of Brazil ==
=== Opinion about the president ===
For most papers, the U.S. did not intervene in the succession crisis created by the resignation of Jânio Quadros on August 25, 1961. (Note: See also Campanha da Legalidade#International reaction.) There is documentary evidence that already at that time there was negative opinion of Jango, the next in the succession line. For Kennedy, "We don't want this comrade [Goulart] for four and a half years [in power]'". The State Department wrote to the American president that Jango would receive "the reasonable benefit of the doubt". In the following years, the existing mistrust would only increase.

Since 1953, when Jango was appointed Getúlio Vargas' Minister of Labor, his relations with the radical left were already a concern in Washington. For many members of the Kennedy administration, Goulart was not a communist, but he still opened space for the political growth of communists. The elements considered communist in the unions would be an important source of political capital, but this association would eventually influence society. The IEP could even be tolerated, but not these union contacts. Thus, Jango could not be trusted to receive economic assistance from the Alliance for Progress.

In a message to Dean Rusk, Secretary of State, on August 21, 1963, Lincoln Gordon analyzed the Brazilian political situation. He evaluated that Goulart would launch a coup d'état to create a nationalist authoritarian regime along the lines of Vargas and Juan Perón. His incompetence would then lead to his deposition by the communists; it would be a "two-stage coup". The State Department's Bureau of Intelligence and Research disagreed with this reasoning and concluded that Goulart only intended to complete his term and hand over power to his elected successor. In the White House there was a suspicion that, as pro-Goulart figures pointed to him as a nefarious influence on Brazilian politics, Gordon was offended, biasing his assessments. Still, the ambassador's views were in harmony with the worldview of politicians in Washington, and his ideas were ultimately well-received in the government.

In the following decades, Gordon insisted that his analysis was correct, though varying his arguments. In 1967, he stated that "we have far more solid evidence than we have accusations in the Brazilian anti-government press". (Note: "...we approved the Brazilian revolution because of our conviction that the president was planning to accumulate dictatorial powers on the pattern of his two mentors, Getúlio Vargas and Juan Perón. To support this conviction we have much more solid evidence than accusations in the Brazilian antigovernment press. I never had any reason to doubt that...") In 2005, he contradicted his earlier claims, being much more modest about the evidence: "All the newspaper reports said, I don't know if we had any definitive confirmation". (Note: Then: "If you reviewed the Brazilian press, you would see all kinds of rumors. The general impression was that that rally [of the Central] would be the definitive one. On the Primeiro de Maio he would announce that he was assuming full powers, which would be equivalent to Vargas' speech in 1937 [installing] the Estado Novo. The stories sounded as if they were going to go down a path that we already knew, but I don't have any inside information on how that would happen".)

=== Other issues ===
The American public in general knew little about Brazil, and the events in Panama in 1964 and in the Dominican Republic the following year had more resonance than the Brazilian coup. The government saw "a continental country, populous, with significant economic possibilities, but militarily unimportant". For the Alliance of Progress, Brazil, as the largest country in Latin America, was considered its most important edge.

The diplomats had an image based both on well-established interpretations of reality and on stereotypes also common among Brazilians, such as "cordiality" and "jeitinho"; they even conceived negative traits such as laziness and corruption. Americans working in the country often had a paternalistic attitude. The press was considered unreliable and intellectuals tending too much toward abstraction. "The apathy, resignation, and incapacitation of the poor in general and the complacency and incompetence of government agencies" would be barring development. Anti-American sentiment was a concern.

Among the political parties, the National Democratic Union (UDN), opposed to laboriousm, was the closest to the American concept of development. The State Department considered it promising for a modernization of Brazilian capitalism. In February 1961 the Embassy evaluated that the party would have difficulties to accumulate political capital.

Special attention was reserved for the Brazilian Northeast, "the largest area of extreme poverty in Latin America (23 million people, per capita income below $100)". It was a region prone to unrest and political radicalization, sometimes compared to Cuba by Americans. The focus was not on politicians, but on social movements, notably the Peasant Leagues, sources of great concern. The fear was that social conflict in the region would lead to a Cuban-like revolution. On the other hand, the Northeast was also considered ideal to implement the Alliance for Progress, modernizing its agrarian economy and social structure to ward off the conceived threats. Foreign aid was focused on the region, entering into alliance with local political leaderships.

The CIA followed Cuba's and the USSR's assessments of Brazil. According to a 1963 report, the Cubans favored a revolution of their own, while the Soviets opposed it. Luís Carlos Prestes, general secretary of the Brazilian Communist Party, was pointed out as a probable intermediary between Moscow and Havana.

== Presidential relations ==
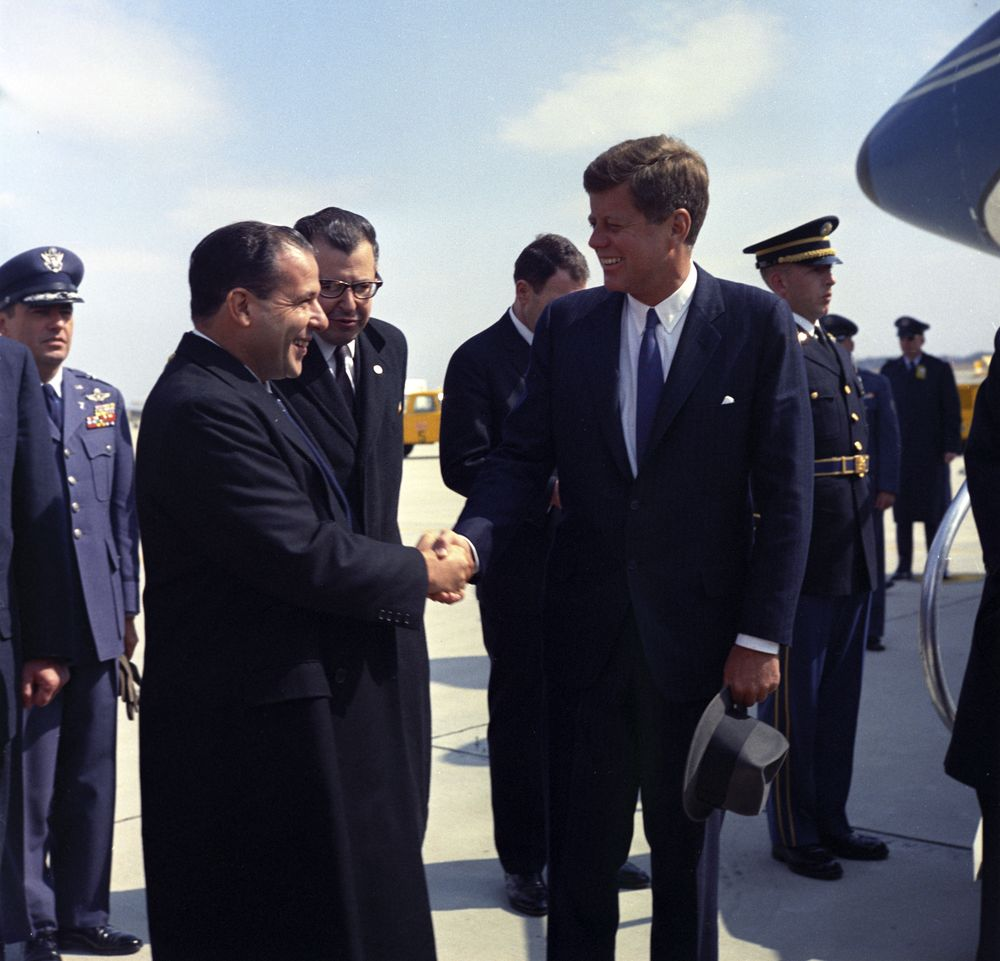
Kennedy greets Goulart on his arrival in the United States, 1962

Jango visited the United States in April 1962, where he established a good personal relationship with Kennedy, gave speeches at the OAS and in Congress, and attracted positive attention in the press. In Brazil the trip also resonated well in the newspapers, while the Communist Party criticized him.

A visit by Kennedy to Brazil was expected for July, but was postponed to November. Goulart's justification was the elections in both countries (general elections in Brazil and legislative elections in the US). He wanted the visit to give prestige to his government before the elections. The Americans, however, were financing the opposition candidates. In October, the Missile Crisis justified another postponement, now without a date. It is likely that, with the Brazilian behavior during the Missile Crisis, the American government no longer wanted to treat Goulart as a privileged ally. Goulart wanted Kennedy's presence, but it became a way of pressuring him.

In December, Attorney General Robert F. Kennedy, Kennedy's brother, went to Brasília to explain to Goulart the problems from the American point of view. For him and Gordon, the conversation went nowhere. In July 1963 the two presidents met at the inauguration of Pope Paul VI. Kennedy later accepted the invitation for a visit, then scheduled for November. That month Kennedy was assassinated. Goulart became worried. Afterwards, his position would become more difficult with the inauguration of Johnson, who had a tougher foreign policy.

== Independent Foreign Policy ==
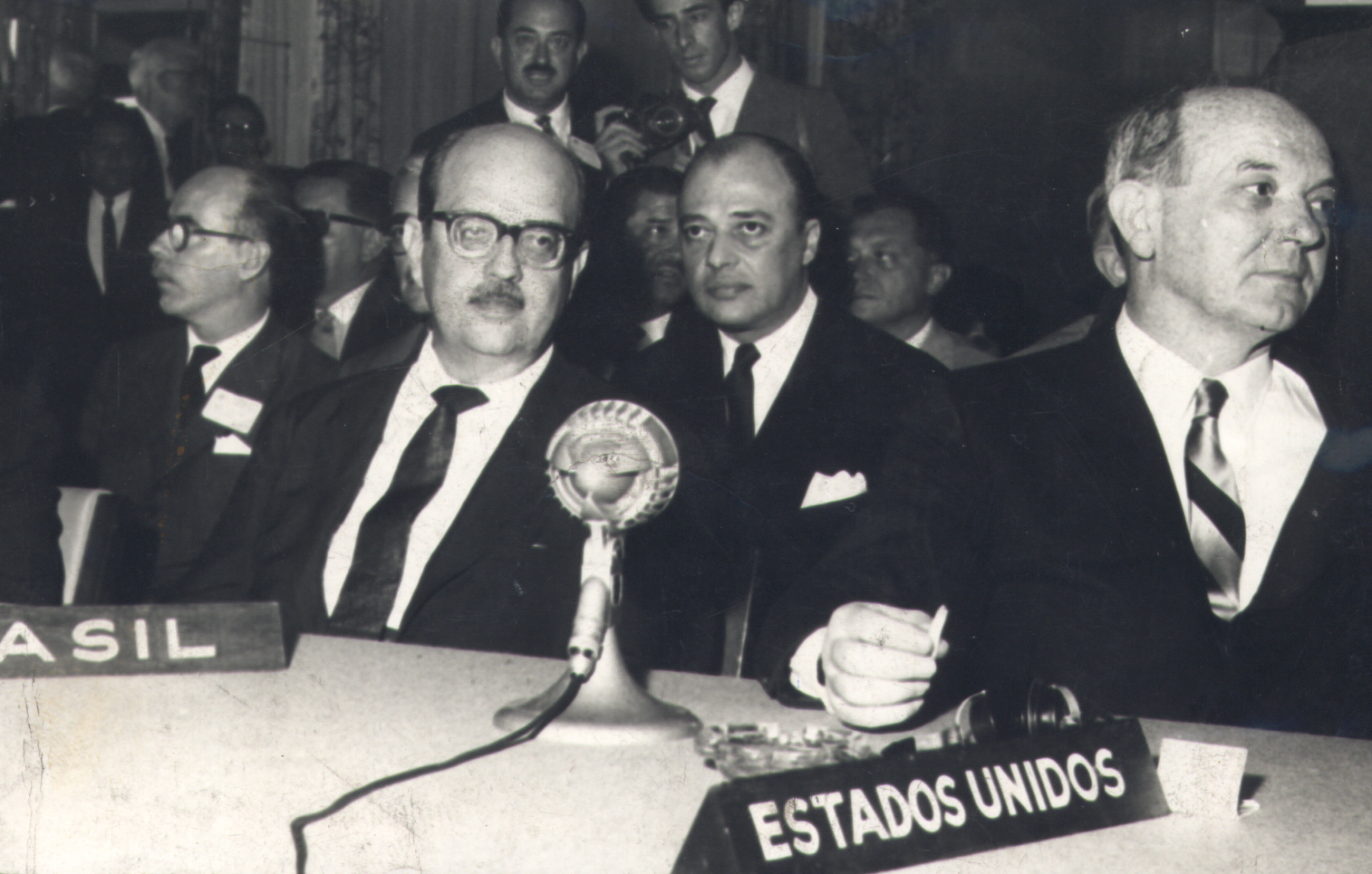
San Tiago Dantas, the Brazilian Minister of Foreign Affairs

At the Second Punta del Este Conference, (Note: The III Meeting of Consultation of Ministers of Foreign Affairs.) in January 1962, Brazil continued the IEP, abstaining from voting for the exclusion of Cuba from the OAS and opposing the use of sanctions. San Tiago Dantas, the Brazilian Minister of Foreign Affairs, proposed the "Finlandization" of Cuba, so that it would keep its system but be neutralized and have a code of coexistence with the hemisphere. The continuation of the IEP would be a reason for dissatisfaction in the Kennedy administration with the directions of Brazilian foreign policy, but there was no immediate impact on relations. The IEP was seen as a way to use Brazil as an intermediary for Portuguese Africa to some extent, and a CIA report concluded that there was no Brazilian intention to approach the Cubans.

At Kennedy's request, in 1962 Goulart interceded with the Cuban government to prevent the execution of prisoners captured after participating in the Bay of Pigs Invasion. (Note: Read also: James G. Hershberg (2021-04-29). "Saving the Bay of Pigs Prisoners: Did JFK Send a Secret Warning to Fidel Castro – through Brazil?". NSA Archive.) The same year, during the Missile Crisis, Kennedy demanded the withdrawal of Soviet missiles from Cuba. Jango communicated to the American ambassador his support for this decision. Lincoln Gordon evaluated this moment as a high point in a deteriorating relationship. When, on October 22, the USA convened an OAS meeting, Brazil was in favor of a naval blockade of the island, but opposed to military intervention.

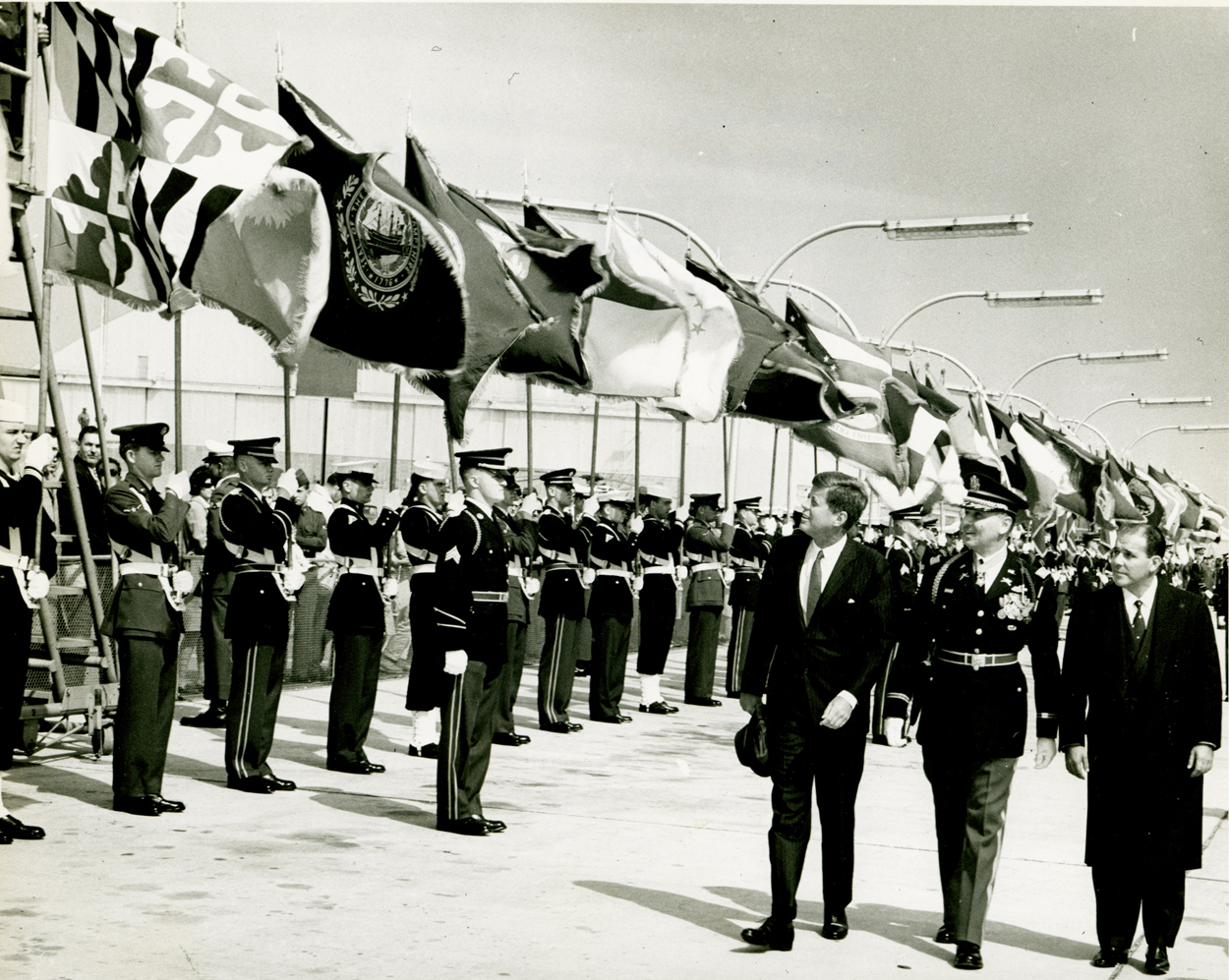
J. F. Kennedy (left) and João Goulart (right), Brazilian and American presidents, 1962

The U.S. used Brazil as an intermediary with Cuba. Thus, general Albino Silva, head of the Casa Militar, was sent to speak with Fidel Castro, although the Americans considered the general sympathetic to communism and preferred that the messenger was Bastian Pinto, the Brazilian ambassador in Havana. At the UN, Brazil proposed an international inspection of Cuba and the transformation of Latin America into a Nuclear Weapons Free Zone. The first proposal was not necessary, as the USSR agreed to have the inspection done by American aircraft, while the second, although potentially agreeable to both the U.S. and the Soviet bloc, was not accepted by Cuba. Brazilian attempts to mediate tensions were unsuccessful, running into Cuban intransigence. The Americans felt that Goulart had lost credibility and his rhetoric was ambiguous. Relations with Washington (and Havana) ended up damaged.

In November 1961 Brazil resumed diplomatic relations with the Soviet Union, at the end of a long process initiated by the Jânio government. The following year, it discussed with the People's Republic of Poland the purchase of one hundred helicopters with coffee. In December, it signed a $70 million credit agreement with the Poles; until then, its relations with the Eastern bloc were only through bilateral trade. Agreements in the area of oil were considered.

For the White House, Brazil was approaching the Non-Aligned Movement, expanding its political relations with the Soviet bloc and, in international forums, testing the limits of its relationship and tending towards neutralism. As part of his negotiations for American credit, Jango threatened to seek support from the Soviet bloc. Although with little credibility, this maneuver influenced American calculations. This, coupled with the rejection of the use of force in the Missile Crisis, changed American views on the IEP. An additional concern was the Dianopolis incident in 1962, after which Cuban support for a guerrilla project on Brazilian territory was discovered. Still, there is the interpretation that domestic factors were more important than foreign policy in the deterioration of bilateral relations. Lincoln Gordon judged Brazilian foreign policy as unreal, but a learning process, and wanted to prioritize economic policy.

== Foreign investments ==
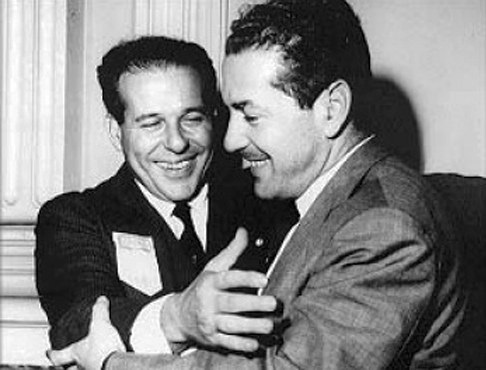
Goulart and Brizola

Many American companies had investments or investment plans in Brazil. Thus the private lobby against the Brazilian government was stirred by the law limiting profit remittances and cases of expropriation of American companies by Leonel Brizola, governor of Rio Grande do Sul. The new legislation governing foreign capital, though passed by the Chamber of Deputies in November 1961, was neither sanctioned nor vetoed by the president, even though he was favorable to it, being left to Congress. According to Moniz Bandeira, this was a way to avoid friction with the U.S. In September 1962, Congress approved the law, but its final regulation, which was up to the president, only came in January 1964. As registration with the Superintendency of Money and Credit (Sumoc) became necessary, the processing of requests began and the remittance of profits abroad and the entry of new investments were practically paralyzed in 1963–1964.

The issue of expropriations came to the fore in February 1962, with the seizure of a Rio Grande do Sul subsidiary of International Telephone and Telegraph (ITT). Brizola paid only a fraction of the company's estimated value, justifying that he had discounted the value of the land and illegal profits. With the attention given to the case, American & Foreign Power (AMFORP), which Brizola had expropriated in 1959, also mobilized. Kennedy interpreted the problem as political and instructed Lincoln Gordon to pressure Goulart, who, in turn, saw the case as an attempt to sabotage his visit to the U.S. In the U.S. Congress, the dispute led to the passage of the Hickenlooper Amendment, providing for the suspension of financial assistance to countries that expropriated American companies without appropriate compensation. (Note: The amendment was never invoked in the Brazilian case. The Executive was against it from the beginning, thinking that it would be an obstacle in foreign policy, and only once - in Ceylon (Sri Lanka) in 1963 - it was used. See Lillich, Richard B. (June 1964). "The Protection of Foreign Investment and the Hickenlooper Amendment". University of Pennsylvania Law Review. 112 (8): 1116–1131. doi:10.2307/3310530. JSTOR 3310530., and McInnis, Donna (1973). The American Congress and foreign policy-making; a case study of the Hickenlooper-Adair amendment (thesis). McGill University..)

The Brazilian president committed himself to solve the expropriation issue. In January 1963, he agreed to compensate ITT. In late April, he reached an agreement to buy the assets of AMFORP, which would reinvest 75% of the value in other sectors. The right did not approve of nationalization, and the left of reinvestment. The deal was controversial, with nationalists protesting that the purchase would be for more than double the estimated value of the assets, and Jango cancelled it, pending the exact value of the property. Internally, he was weakened. Externally, his delay irritated the Americans.

== Economic diplomacy ==
=== During parliamentarianism ===
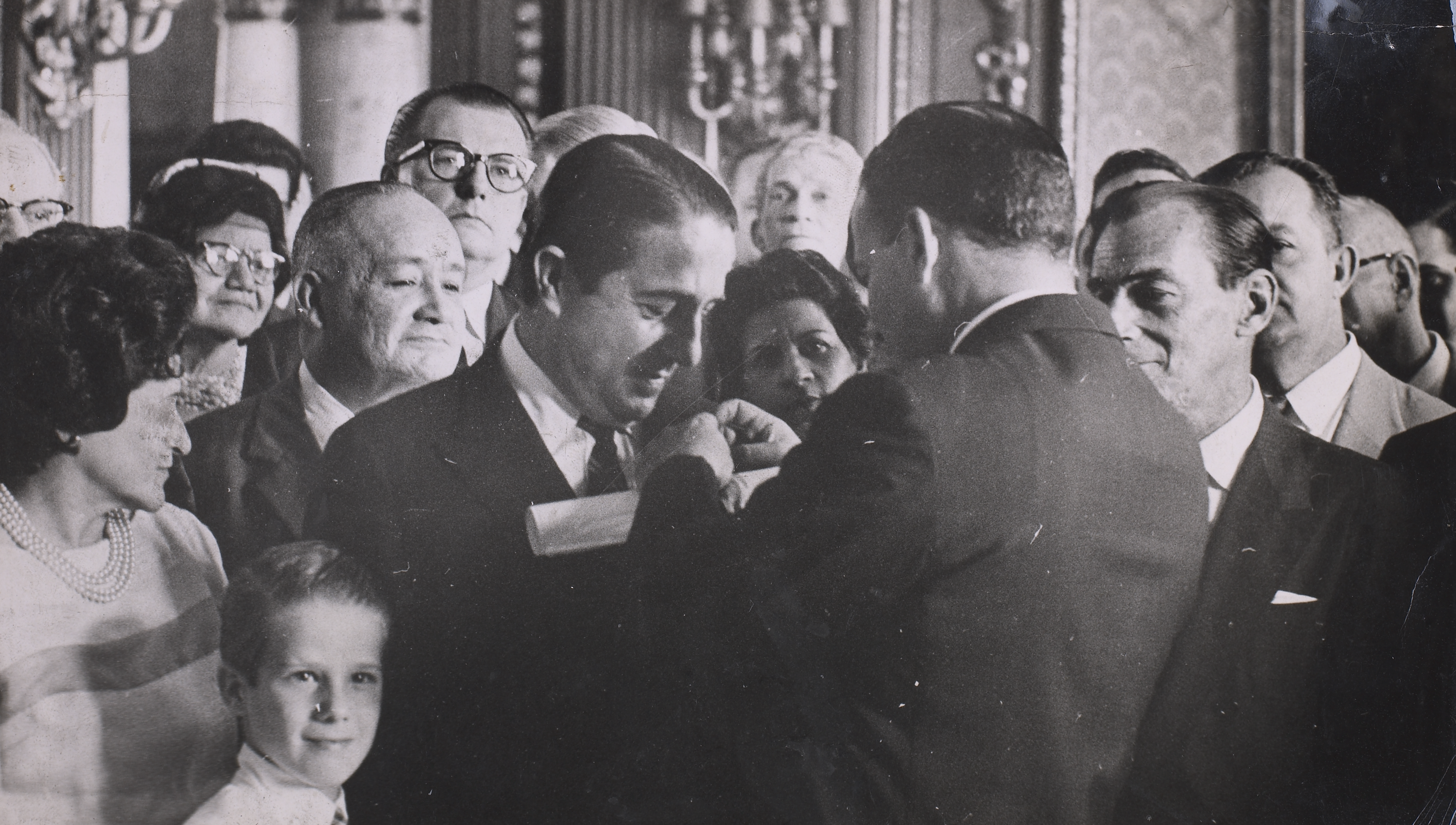
Moreira Salles, the Brazilian Minister of Finance

With Goulart's inauguration, the Embassy recommended maintaining existing financial arrangements and slowing down or not establishing new ones. Kennedy's administration partly followed this line of reasoning and in the following years approved only short-term credit and funds for Brazil's Northeast. The need for stabilization, relativized for Jânio, was rigidly demanded of his successor, due mainly to his political associations and, to a lesser extent, to pressure from American businessmen and the stabilization failure of his predecessor. The economic policy recommendations accompanying the agreements were used to put pressure on the Jango government. The goal was, through economic aid, to make his government break with the radical left and adopt a pro-American and anti-communist foreign policy.

Brazil had US$338 million in American loans already negotiated, but not yet delivered. With bureaucratic justifications, this credit was effectively frozen after the inauguration. Dean Rusk conditioned its release on Brazil's commitment to the goals negotiated by Jânio with the IMF. This impediment did not last long, and by April 1962 $224 million that had been negotiated under the previous government was released. The release was little by little and, when possible, at short notice. The pressure exerted by Minister of Finance Walter Moreira Salles, Kennedy's desire not to give the impression of being a deal breaker, Goulart's weakened position within the parliamentary system, his political moderation and the importance of Brazil explain the continuity of American support at the beginning of his government.

In January 1962, an IMF mission expressed concern over the public deficit and control over the exchange rate. In March, Moreira Salles proposed a stabilization program to follow the Fund's recommendations, which, however, were limited to extending a $20 million debt and urging European creditors to release $20 million negotiated with Jânio. The program was unsuccessful due to lack of additional U.S. credit and a political crisis in mid-year. In addition, Goulart focused his political capital on anticipating the plebiscite on parliamentarianism and recovering his full powers. Thus, he had no way to make an unpopular fiscal adjustment and no reason to stabilize the parliamentary system, which he needed to eliminate.

Americans expected political changes from Goulart after his visit to the U.S. in April - especially the distancing of communists in the trade union milieu - but in the following months these did not materialize. Jango resorted to pressure from the unions in order to restore his full presidential powers, achieving in September the anticipation of the plebiscite to January of the following year. Political polarization and social conflict were growing. By mid-year, Brazil-U.S. relations deteriorated and loan disbursements were again interrupted. The justification was the macroeconomic deterioration (public and external deficits and inflation were out of control) but there was the important political issue: the prospect was the end of parliamentarianism, with Goulart gaining freedom of action. The Americans had adopted a "step by step" policy, making the granting of credit conditional on political change.

=== Late 1962 to 1963 ===
After the anticipated plebiscite, a commission led by William Henry Draper Jr. visited Brazil. It produced a report proposing to cut all aid, leading to the country's economic deterioration, followed by Goulart's turn to the left, and ultimately his overthrow by the military. This document was controversial, highlighting the lack of consensus in Washington on how to deal with Brazil. Lincoln Gordon was against the proposal. The debate continued and in mid-November Dean Rusk informed Gordon of the State Department's conclusions: there would be no major assistance to cover the Brazilian balance of payments deficit, but there would be minor support as long as Goulart made concessions. The latter, in turn, intended to implement the Triennial Plan, projected from September to December. To balance high growth, low inflation and compliance with international obligations, the Plan would need American economic aid.

At this point there was dissatisfaction in the Brazilian government with Kennedy's assistance policy. On November 19, 1962, in a meeting with Gordon, Jango insisted on the need for American support to accomplish the Triennial Plan and, according to Gordon, threatened a break with the US: he could default on the debt, ration gasoline and wheat, increase the socialization of the economy, accept Soviet loans and publicly denounce the Americans, the IMF and the Alliance for Progress. This maneuver was possibly inspired by Vargas, who in 1940, during World War II, threatened to align Brazil with the Axis. He thus managed to pressure the Americans into granting a large amount of Lend-Lease financial support. However, the situation was different. The balance of power between the US and the USSR was in favor of the Americans in 1962, different from the proportion against the Germans in 1940. Vargas had room to maneuver internally, while Goulart could be overthrown by pro-American military if he actually followed a pro-Soviet line. In the hypothesis of a rupture with the U.S., be it only financial or also commercial, Brazil would be left with a huge external deficit, even if it received help from the Soviet bloc. Washington, realizing it had a strategic advantage, hardened its positions.

Jango regained his presidential powers in January 1963. From the American point of view, his new initiatives expressed a positive change, with a "possible divergence between the regime and communist and pro-communist elements on the left". He triggered stabilization with the Triennial Plan, initiated talks with the IMF for a stand-by loan, compensated the ITT subsidiary, made the deal with AMFORP, supported the Workers' Trade Union (UST), which had no communists, and moderated the IEP, notably not giving official support to a pro-Cuba congress.

For its part, the U.S. provided a loan of US$30 million in January to keep Brazil from going bankrupt. In March San Tiago Dantas (now Minister of Finance) went to Washington to negotiate more credit, signing an agreement with David E. Bell, head of USAID. The remaining US$84 million of Jânio's agreements were offered under conditions: the signing of the memorandum with AMFORP and devaluation of the exchange rate. Both were met in April, and the credit was released. Another $314 million, also conditional, was to be delivered over twelve months, but the U.S. did not disburse it. The IMF sent another mission and provided $60 million, without making a stand-by arrangement. This, in turn, made it difficult to seek credit in private banks or in Europe.

With his international creditors still dissatisfied, Goulart probably concluded that the considerable loss of domestic support caused by his agreements had not been matched by external gains. Thus, in mid-1963 he reversed course and hardened his position with the US. The Triennial Plan was abandoned, taking the possibilities of an agreement with the IMF and the US with it and deepening the economic and social crises. No further credit was released, and $86 million offered by USAID presumably was passed to opposition governors, not Brazil's federal government. However, financial relations did not reach the point of a rupture, which would hurt the pro-American governors and the military. In Washington, the policy of financial toughness with Brazil was controversial and had its opponents.

== Opposition funding ==
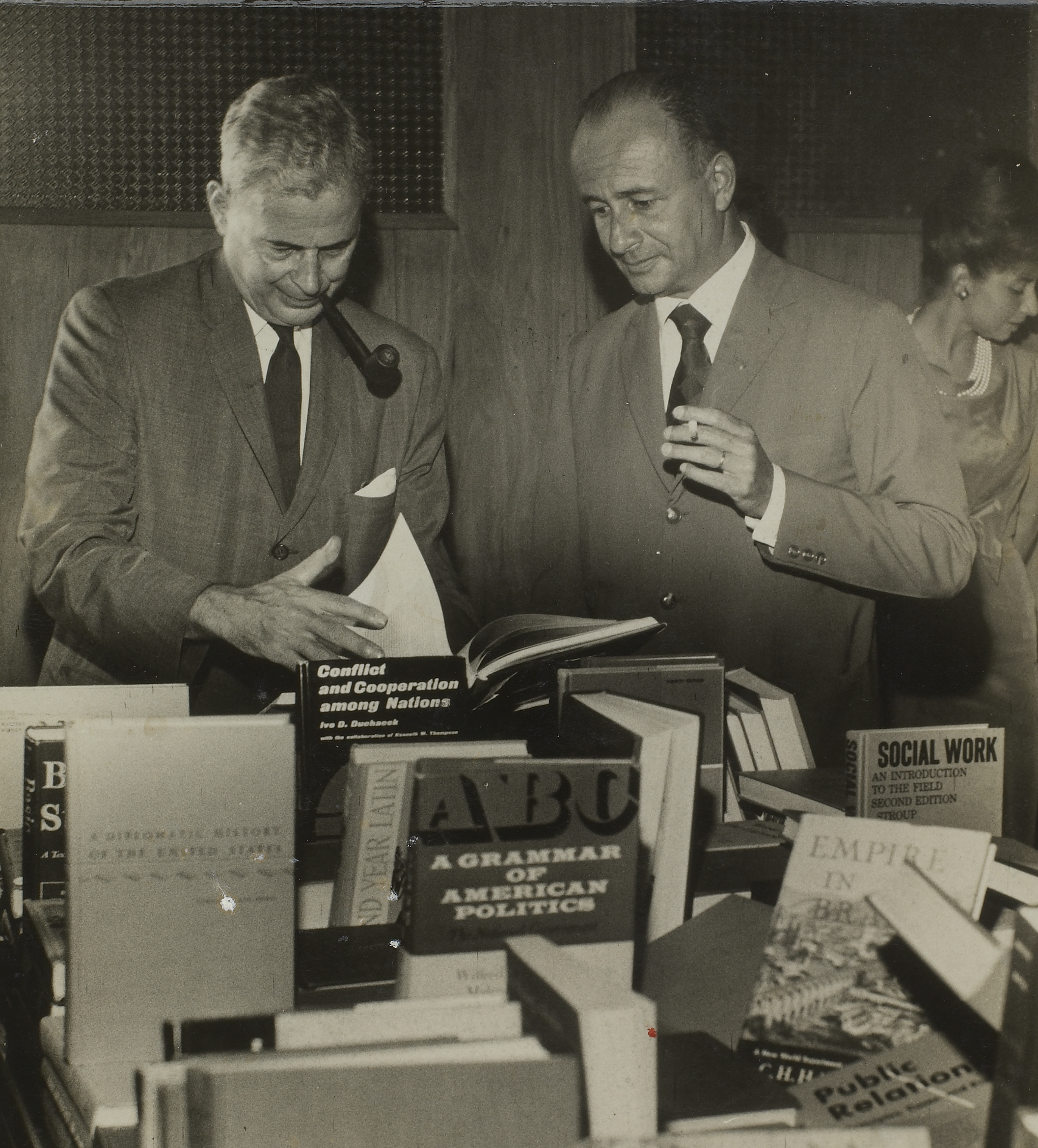
Lincoln Gordon (left) in 1963

From June to August 1962, while the "step-by-step" policy to reorient Goulart through loans was being implemented, the U.S. government decided to support "democratic" candidates in the October elections, direct Alliance for Progress funds to favorable governors, and organize a pro-U.S. faction among the military. (Note: Later, a National Security Council memorandum (NSC, 11 de dezembro de 1962) included among the policies "Continuing to encourage Brazilian moderate democratic elements in Congress, the Armed Forces and elsewhere who advocate domestic and foreign policies which we can support.") Gordon explained to Kennedy that these efforts should strengthen the "democratic and moderate elements" so that Goulart would cooperate with them, not with the radical left. Thus, the eventual deposition of the president, although taken into consideration, would not be the goal. Jango was the target of a destabilization campaign; according to historian Stephen Rabe, Kennedy's effort against Fidel Castro, João Goulart and Cheddi Jagan "had no precedent in the history of inter-American relations". (Note: Loureiro 2014 is said to have the same conclusion as Carlos Fico, disagreeing, however, with his classification of this initial period as one of "destabilization".) It was from this moment on that the embassy became a political actor in Brazilian internal affairs.

In 1977 Lincoln Gordon admitted that between one and five million dollars had been spent on the election campaign. In 1994, he talked about five or six million. CIA agent Philip Agee talked about 20 million. The Brazilian Institute for Democratic Action (IBAD), which sponsored candidates through Popular Democratic Action (ADEP), was even then suspected of having foreign backing. A Parliamentary Inquiry Commission was unable to prove the origin of the money, but the two organizations were closed down by presidential decree and then by the courts. Years later IBAD's connection to the CIA was confirmed.

Still, many leftist, reformist and labor candidates were elected. ADEP's success was limited, with both victories and defeats of the candidates it supported. In the embassy's assessment, the electorate continued its march to the left. In the case of the Northeast, the feeling was that efforts to influence public opinion were a failure. Leftist Miguel Arraes won the government of Pernambuco, the political and economic center of the region, even with IBAD's support for the candidacy of his opponent João Cleofas. Arraes had no commitment to the Alliance for Progress, whose focus had to shift to other states.

The decision in mid-1962 to support favorable governors was executed by redirecting Alliance for Progress funds to their states, which Lincoln Gordon would later call "islands of administrative sanity." In this way, the investment would not benefit the federal government or governors contrary to the US, among them Miguel Arraes, for whom the policy was not to benefit it, but without creating the impression of persecution. If it was still necessary to finance works in Pernambuco, they should favor elements more favorable to the US within his government. Among the other Northeastern states, favoured were Rio Grande do Norte, Bahia and Ceará; in the Southeast, Guanabara. Opposition governors Carlos Lacerda, of Guanabara, and Adhemar de Barros, of São Paulo, gained prestige by visiting Kennedy.

== Other measures ==
The United States Information Service (USIS) financed ideological propaganda in Brazil. The amount set aside for this purpose reached US$2 million in 1964. Its staff employed in the country was 26 in 1958–60, rising to 43 by 1965. Among other activities, the organization financed trips to the U.S. for politicians, journalists, professors, and university students, showed films, and distributed publications. Carlos Fico commented that knowing of the existence of propaganda does not in itself confirm that it was effective and accepted by the "target audience".

Deputy José Joffily, to Diário de Notícias, journalist José Frejat, in a column in O Semanário, and Francisco Julião, leader of the Peasant Leagues, affirmed the presence of American military in disguise in Brazil, especially in the Northeast. Moniz Bandeira cited these affirmations and specified that they were Green Berets from the American Army. He added that the entry of Americans in 1962 was in a volume far above the average for the time, comparable only to that seen during World War II, when military bases were operated in the country. He also described the smuggling of weapons into Brazil's territory.

According to the head of the Federal Intelligence and Counterintelligence Service of the Goulart government, Ivo Acioly Corseuil, sailor José Anselmo dos Santos, leader of the 1964 Sailors' Revolt, was a CIA agent provocateur. Thus, the revolt would be the work of American manipulation. However, for the most recent literature there is no evidence for this accusation and the origins of the revolt are within the Brazilian Navy. (Note: See Almeida, Anderson da Silva (2010). Todo o leme a bombordo – marinheiros e ditadura civil-militar no Brasil: da rebelião de 1964 à Anistia (PDF) (Thesis) (in Brazilian Portuguese). Niterói: UFF.. p. 138, and Silva, André Gustavo da (2014). Um estudo sobre a participação da PMMG no movimento golpista de 1964 em Belo Horizonte (PDF) (Thesis) (in Brazilian Portuguese). São João del Rei: UFSJ.. p. 154-155.)

== Involvement with the deposition ==
=== The attitude in favor of the conspirators ===
Historiography diverges on the inevitability of the clash between the Kennedy and Goulart administrations, as well as the moment when the U.S. started collaborating with the Brazilian conspirators who would carry out the coup d'état in 1964. While certain authors deemed the confrontation inevitable, others considered the alternatives available to the Americans. For Moniz Bandeira, well before 1963 the American government was already predisposed to the overthrow the Brazilian, because there would be a conflict between the interests of capitalists in the U.S. and autonomous industrialization in Brazil. José Paulo Netto (Note: Pequena história da ditadura brasileira (2014).) and Flávio Tavares (Note: 1964: o golpe (2014).) have similar reasoning and placed the decisive moment in 1962, respectively in the OAS conference in January or in the Gordon-Kennedy meeting in July. Carlos Fico, on the other hand distinguished between destabilizing the government and plotting to overthrow it, the latter being embraced by Americans only in 1963. (Note: In his definition (pp. 75-76), destabilization would not necessarily lead to the deposition of the president, it could only weaken him in the elections, and there is no empirical evidence that it had the same intentions as the conspiracy. Loureiro 2013 and Pereira 2018 have a similar reasoning.)

American actions progressively increased the chances of occurrence and success of a rebellion against the Brazilian government, but the dynamics of the crisis were mainly Brazilian. "An interpretation based on the analysis of vast documentation, which has been supported by several historians", understands that the people responsible for the coup were Brazilians, but with the full support of the American government. For Carlos Fico there was an overvaluation of the American importance in the 60s and 70s, under the academic dominance of Marxism, but affecting mainly journalists and commentators, followed by an undervaluation in the next decades.

The possibility of overthrow was discussed as recently as July 30, 1962, at a meeting in Washington:

-Gordon: "I think one of our important jobs is to strengthen the spine of the military. To make it clear, discreetly, that we are not necessarily hostile to any kind of military action whatsoever if it’s clear that the reason for the military action is"

-Kennedy: "Against the Left."

Gordon added that "The military, I can see that they are very friendly to us: very anti-Communist, very suspicious of Goulart." but "The military's not united. This is one of the things that make it complicated." The participants decided to send a representative to be an intermediary with the Brazilian military. The envoy would then be Vernon Walters, assigned as military attaché. He was fluent in Portuguese and had good relations with important officers, knowing his Brazilian counterparts since World War II. From Brazil, he passed on what he heard from them.

There is contradiction of opinions about this meeting being a definite decision to support a coup. (Note: Pereira 2018, p. 12, don't believe it, as opposed to Flávio Tavares.) The alternative - pushing the government to the center-right - had in its favor, at the time, the belief in the possibility of influencing Goulart, the doubt about the military's ability to overthrow the government, and the fear of supporting an unsuccessful coup. On December 11, 1962, the National Security Council Executive Committee held a meeting where President Kennedy “accepted the recommendation that our best course of action is to seek to change the political and economic orientation of Brazilian President Goulart and his Government.” This decision was based on a review of NSC Memorandum, "U.S. Short-Term policy Toward Brazil," Secret, December 11, 1962 which suggested the U.S. had three options via-a-vis Goulart: one, "do nothing and allow the present drift to continue;” two, “collaborate with Brazilian elements hostile to Goulart with a view to bringing about his overthrow;” and three, “seek to change the political and economic orientation of Goulart and his government.” The NSC staff recommended Kennedy follow option three (engaging with Goulart to influence him of aligning Brazil with U.S. policy and interests) as the most feasible. The memo went on to discuss talking points, tactics, and other ideas for engaging and influencing Goulart. On the subject of an overthrow, the memo ruled this approach out because of the lack of organized opposition in Brazil that could mount an overthrow attempt, as welkl as the lack of U.S. capacity to “stimulate such an operation successfully.” However, an overthrow of Goulart's government was identified as a contingency. The use of economic incentives continued, being abandoned only in 1963. Still, the third option continued to be considered.Doubt about the military's capability still existed even at the end of 1963.

The CIA monitored plots for more than two years before the coup. In March 1963, it identified Odílio Denys as the articulator of the most developed plan. Throughout that year, Kennedy's administration sought a group in the Armed Forces capable and willing to overthrow the Brazilian president. At least by the end of the year, the possibility of supporting his destitution was being seriously considered.

=== The plans ===
A contingency plan in case of a coup d'état in Brazil was probably under development still in the Kennedy administration. A version dated December 11, 1963, early in the Johnson administration, is known. It was drafted by Lincoln Gordon and Benjamin H. Read, Executive Secretary of the State Department. (Note: The document was reproduced in Fico 2008, Annex I. A Portuguese language translation was published in 2007 at Folha Online.) It described that while a rightist coup should not be encouraged, secret contacts would be maintained with Brazilian conspirators. It listed four possible scenarios in Brazil and corresponding lines of action for the US. They were a revolt by the radical left, a revolt by "democratic forces" against an authoritarian turn by the president, the removal of Goulart in response to the deterioration of the national situation, and a gradual seizure of power by the extreme left, with the Armed Forces neutralized. In the end, he added one more scenario, external communist support.

In Carlos Fico's evaluation, the ambassador's intention was that the first and fourth scenarios, being unlikely, would be discarded in favor of the second and third. The bureaucratic tradition of leaving the expected option among other unlikely ones has already been described by Henry Kissinger. The courses of action in the first, third and fourth scenarios are poorly developed. The second and third have striking similarities to the actual course of events in the coup a few months later, indicating collaboration with Brazilian conspirators. The document mentions the inauguration of Ranieri Mazzili, president of the Chamber of Deputies, until a presidential election within 30 days, a temporary military control and a friendly relationship at the very beginning of the new regime.

The second scenario admitted a conflict, even a civil war, and suggested the formation of an alternative provisional government. The latter could then ask for external help. This is consistent with the memoirs of Afonso Arinos de Melo Franco, according to whom José de Magalhães Pinto, the governor of Minas Gerais, would nominate him as secretary of government; in case of a prolonged conflict, he would obtain the recognition of the state of belligerence abroad. After the request of this provisional government, the line of action would be logistical support. From this was born Operation Brother Sam, a naval task force to follow the Brazilian coast. The hypothesis of a land intervention is mentioned, not clearly, in the expression "intervene with forces", in case of Soviet or Cuban interference. The military plan for this landing was even studied, but was not foreseen in the actual naval operation planned months later.

=== Latest conversations ===
A plan for Brazil's internal defense dates from March 20, 1964. (Note: Annex II em Fico 2008.) It notes the deterioration of the national political-economic crisis and Lincoln Gordon's political assessments as "Peronist-like maneuvers" by the president and the possible installation of a regime contrary to American interests. That same day, Lyndon Johnson approved a naval task force. The operation was in contact with Brazilians, with general José Pinheiro de Ulhoa Cintra, Castelo Branco's trusted man, as intermediary.

In a telegram dated March 27, the ambassador noted the strength of Castelo Branco's group in the officialdom, the imminence of an action, and the possible lack of arms or fuel, suggesting a clandestine delivery of armaments by submarine to the coast of São Paulo. He thought that in this way the opposition military could achieve victory without open American support. However, in the case of a "second stage" with prolonged resistance, he recommended that a squadron be on the coast as a show of force. The next day, the Executive Committee of the National Security Council considered the submarine proposal meaningless (the delivery would be too small) and also criticized sending the squadron, but agreed with the fuel supply. The document emphasized the Second Army, in São Paulo, as the most likely opposing force. Gordon's response insisted that paramilitary forces be previously armed.

== At the time of the coup ==
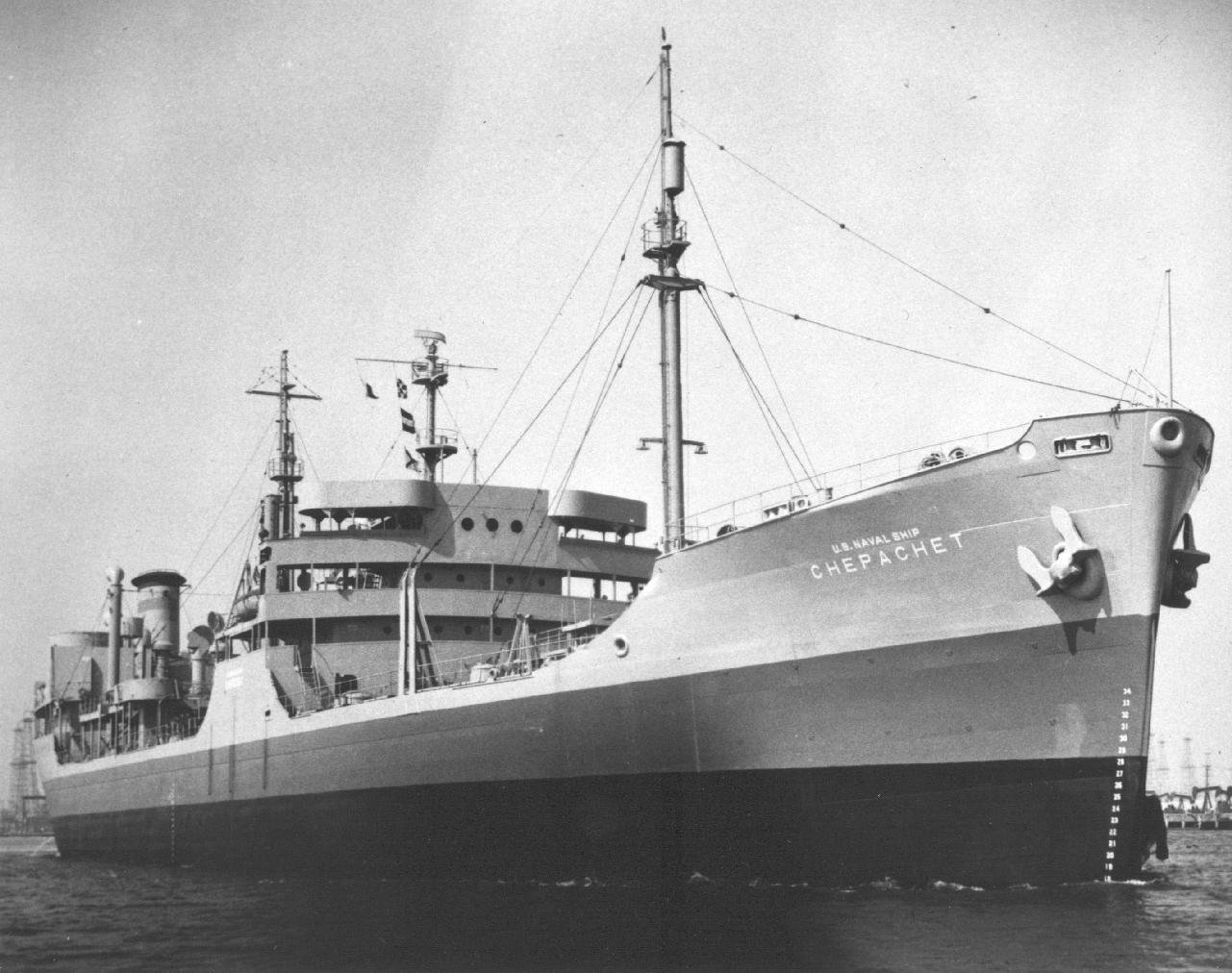
USNS Chepachet, one of the fuel carriers

On the 30th, the CIA reported an imminent "revolution by anti-Goulart forces" in the coming days, with troops from São Paulo and Minas Gerais marching toward Rio de Janeiro to meet with allies there. (Note: See 1964 Brazilian coup in the Paraíba Valley and Operation Popeye.) "The revolution will not be resolved quickly and will be bloody." Dean Rusk ordered the Embassy to transmit more information and all consulates to monitor the actions of the opposition. In the evening Niles Bond, Consul General in São Paulo, reported that he had heard from two leading conspirators that the coup would take place within 48 hours, and further, that the conspirators asked "if the U.S. fleet could quickly reach southern Brazil."

On the morning of the 31st, the 4th Military Region, in Minas Gerais, began the coup d'état in advance. At 11:30 AM, Dean Rusk, Robert McNamara, Secretary of Defense, Maxwell Taylor, Chief of the Joint Chiefs of Staff, and John McCone, Director of the CIA, were already meeting in Washington. They discussed, among other topics, air and naval support capabilities. Shortly thereafter, the naval task force was activated, consisting of the aircraft carrier USS Forrestal, six destroyers, one helicopter carrier, four tankers, cargo planes, fighters, and airlift ammunition. The destination on the Brazilian coast could not be reached before April 10.

The Brazilian president was aware of having the U.S. as an enemy. On the morning of the 1st, San Tiago Dantas informed him that:

It is not impossible that this Minas Gerais movement will be supported by the State Department. It is not impossible that it was not started with the knowledge and agreement of the State Department. It is not impossible that the State Department will recognize the existence of another government in the free territory of Brazil.

His source was Afonso Arinos. This dialog was reproduced by journalist Araújo Netto, in 1964, in an essay "in which the conversations appear in a somewhat romanticized form". (Note: Os idos de março e a queda em abril (1964), pages 62 and 63.) But the event is confirmed by João Pinheiro Neto and Moniz Bandeira, both of whom heard it from Goulart himself. According to Elio Gaspari, this warning was one of the factors in Goulart's decision to leave Rio de Janeiro for Brasília, precipitating the collapse of his military scheme in the First Army.

At 8:30 pm, in a conference call with Washington, the ambassador reported:

"We believe it is all over with democratic rebellion already 95 percent successful. First army solidly in favor and at 1640 general Ancora ordered cessation military action against rebels. Ancora and Kruel will meet at 1800 in Rezende. First army command to be assumed by general Costa e Silva, strongly democratic. Still awaiting formal announcement but we believe Goulart has already or is just about to resign. Mazzilli would then take over on interim basis as provided in constitution. Castello Branco states no need U.S. logistical support." (Note: Costa e Silva actually took over the Ministry of War, delegating the First Army to General Ururahy (Gaspari 2014).)

With Castelo Branco's warning, Operation Brother Sam was dismantled. There was no resignation, but in the early hours of the 2nd the Brazilian Congress declared the presidency vacant, swearing in Ranieri Mazzilli in Jango's place, who had gone to Porto Alegre. The CIA reported that Jango had left Porto Alegre for Montevideo, Uruguay, at 1:00 PM; He was actually in the interior of Rio Grande do Sul, and only arrived in the Uruguayan capital on the 4th. At 10:30 PM on the 2nd, the ambassador reported that the last military resistance, in Porto Alegre, was over.

== Recognition of the new government ==
Lincoln Gordon and the American summit in Washington discussed the recognition and legitimacy of the new government. Under the Brazilian Constitution, the president would lose his office if he left the country without the authorization of Congress, but the session that ousted him was held while he was still in Brazil. Thus, it had no constitutional basis. On the evening of the 2nd, Lyndon Johnson recognized Ranieri Mazzilli's government. The early recognition tarnished the international image of the U.S. government, generating some astonishment in other Latin American governments. Lincoln Gordon and Dean Rusk were concerned about the appearance of legality of the new government, which, in fact, suggested some legality by having the next in line as president and calling new elections, in which, thirteen days after taking office, Congress elected Castelo Branco. The Secretary of State released the official version of the events, with themes such as "communist influence", the presidential message to Congress on March 15, the Central Rally, the Family March, the "unanimous opposition of the constituted powers", the "vacancy of office" and the "unbloody victory". Itamaraty and the State Department sought international recognition, and within 15 days it was obtained throughout Latin America, with the exception of Venezuela. Among European governments there was doubt about the American version, but also the understanding that it was a U.S. problem and not theirs.
