= Operation Brother Sam =

1964 US military operation

- Part of United States support for the 1964 Brazilian coup d'état
- Objective: Support anti-Goulart forces and ensure the coup's success
- Date: 31 March – 2 April 1964
- Outcome: Coup succeeded without direct U.S. military intervention

Operation Brother Sam was the use of the United States Navy and Air Force in support of the coup in Brazil in 1964. With the deterioration in relations with João Goulart's government and the favorable attitude of the groups conspiring against him, the idea of an operation to ensure the success of an uprising arose. The issue was discussed between the U.S. ambassador to Brazil, Lincoln Gordon, and officials in Washington throughout the administration of president John F. Kennedy and his successor Lyndon B. Johnson. They thought about logistical support, the positioning of a squadron on the Brazilian coast to "show the flag" and even, in an extreme situation, a plan for a gigantic land operation, which was not used. The operation was planned by maintaining contact with Brazilian conspirators such as general Castelo Branco, and had as an assumption the formation of a provisional government that would request foreign aid.

With the outbreak of the coup d'état, the operation was activated to transfer fuel such as gasoline by sea to the insurgent military, to leave a squadron near Brazil, and to take war supplies by air. The naval component consisted of the aircraft carrier USS Forrestal, a helicopter carrier and six destroyers from the Second Fleet, as well as four tankers. The aircraft carrier departed from Virginia, while the tankers were to load in the Caribbean. The air component was seven C-135 aircraft, eight supply aircraft, one air support and rescue aircraft, eight fighters, a communications plane, an airborne command post, weapons and ammunition. Air Force general George S. Brown was given command of the mission, which was coordinated by the Southern Command in Panama. (Note: Known until 1963 as Caribbean Command.)

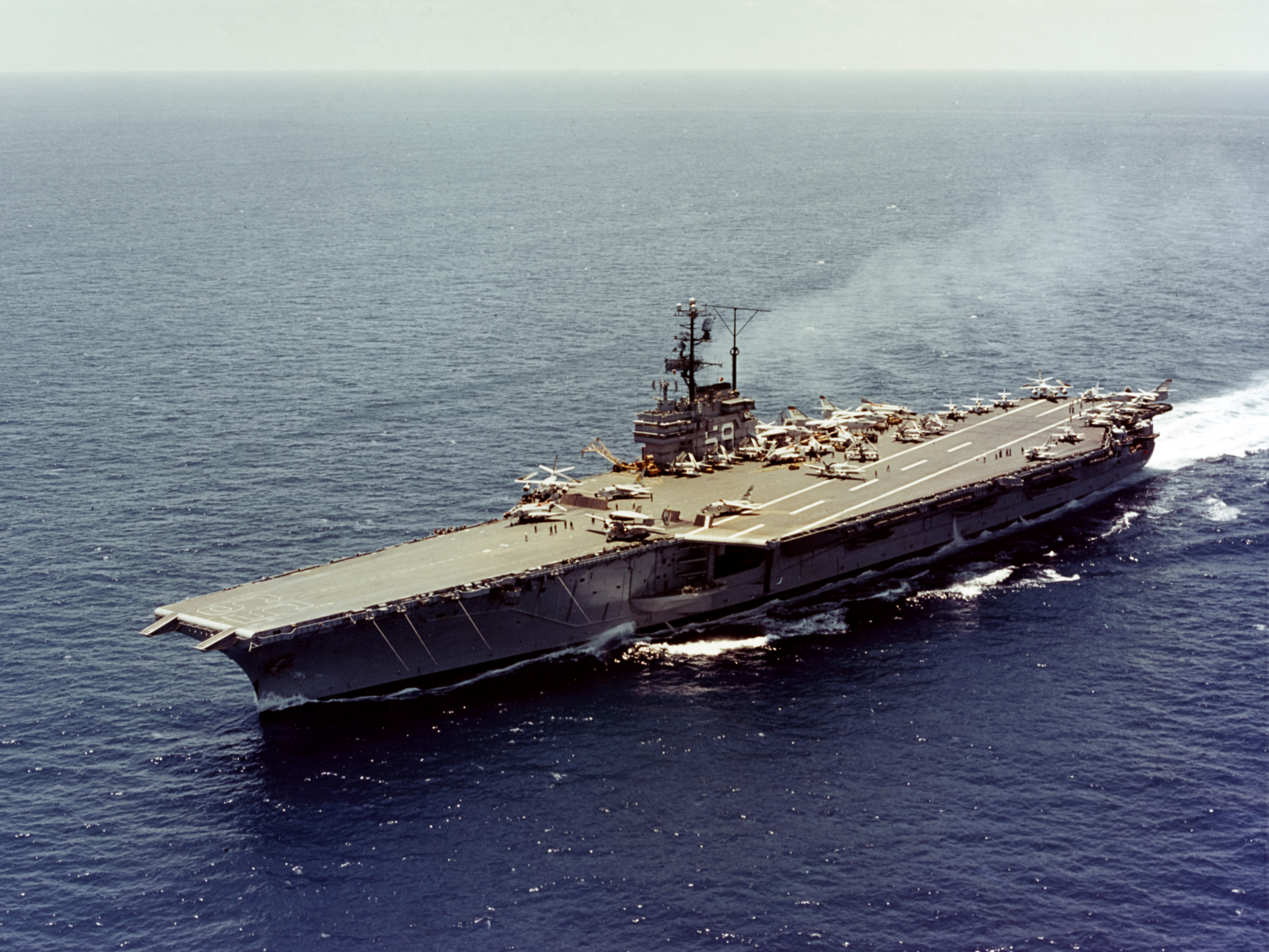
USS Forrestal in 1962

While shipments waited at the air bases, ships began to leave their ports. However, the opposition military in Brazil quickly overthrew the Goulart government, and Castelo Branco reported that logistical support would not be needed. The operation was thus deactivated before it had any physical effect in Brazil, but it demonstrated the interventionist disposition of the American government. It came to light between 1976 and 1977 with the declassification of documents.

== Context ==
After the Cuban Revolution in 1959, the U.S. government's attitude toward leftist leaders in Latin America hardened. Among them was the government of João Goulart in Brazil. The United States was worried by Goulart's domestic and foreign policies and bilateral relations deteriorated. As the Alliance for Progress failed to influence him with moderate methods, Washington resorted to weakening the Brazilian government with measures such as financing the opposition's electoral campaigns in 1962 and redirecting economic assistance to opposition governors.

After a certain period, disputed in the literature, Washington became favorable to the ousting of Goulart. Since 1961 some groups in the Brazilian military were conspiring against the government, and the U.S. Embassy was aware of such movements. By 1963 the U.S. government was already looking for a group in the Brazilian Armed Forces capable of overthrowing Goulart. Meanwhile, by the end of that year it was developing contingency plans and working on what to do in case of a rebellion. A concern arose that the rebels would need American support to succeed; on October 7, Kennedy asked Gordon about the possibility that intervention might be necessary. A State Department document made in November mentioned a new contingency plan with "heavy emphasis on armed U.S. intervention." The contingency plan that would lead to operation Brother Sam had a wider scope than the operation itself.

== Developing the operation ==
=== American Summit discussions ===
The December 11, 1963 version of the contingency plan, (Note: Original in Fico 2008, Anexo I.) probably in development since the previous months, listed four possibilities. The third, the removal of Goulart, was similar to what actually happened. The second was:

Overt, organized resistance by sizable democratic forces, with considerable military support, against Goulart effort to seize authoritarian power.

This implies the possibility of civil war or at least a clash between democratic forces and the incumbent Goulart regime. In such circumstance we should carefully abstain from giving support to Goulart by public pronouncement, by arms supply, or in any other way. We should maintain an initial non-interventionist posture but at the same time seek ways and means of assisting the democratic forces.

The military conspirators were called "democratic forces". At their request,

the United States might well be willing to provide covert or even overt support, particularly logistical support (POL [petrol, oil and lubricants], food, arms and ammunition)

The document stressed that its premature discovery would be politically harmful. Likewise, an open intervention followed by Goulart's victory against his opponents would be an embarrassment. The idea of a naval task force was not present at this point, but the possibility of "intervening with force only if there was Soviet or Cuban intervention" could allude to such a task force or even to a ground operation.

By mid-March 1964, the Embassy reported on the worsening political crisis, the unity of military conspirators under the figure of general Castelo Branco, who could lead a coup d'état, and the adhesion of State governors to the conspiracy. A meeting at the White House on March 20 and another at the Embassy shortly thereafter established that an aircraft carrier and tankers would be sent to support the opposition. The former had the assumption that, even with Castelo Branco's supporters taking most of the country, there might be resistance in Rio Grande do Sul and Pernambuco, and a naval presence on the coast, "showing the flag", would be a show of force in favor of the rebels. Lincoln Gordon later stated that one of the goals of the task force would be to evacuate American citizens on Brazilian territory. This is possible, but it is not mentioned in his correspondence with the Secretary of State in 1964.

The idea was criticized by some experts at a meeting at the White House. For McGeorge Bundy, National Security Advisor, "the punishment doesn't seem to match the crime." General Andrew Goodpaster did not understand how the squad could help the oppositionists. Lincoln Gordon had to face opposition from his superiors to get his ideas across, standing out as the central figure in the entire effort to support Brazilian military conspirators.

Fuel deliveries would prevent Goulart supporters in Petrobras from cutting off supply. This concern had been transmitted to the Central Intelligence Agency (CIA) by São Paulo businessman Alberto Byington. On the other hand, the December 1963 plan already mentioned fuel and stated that its provisions should be guaranteed, evidencing that the idea was not born at the last minute. In addition to fuel, there was concern about armaments. Gordon had already registered on Brazil's internal defense plan, (Note: Annex II in Fico 2008.) dated March 20, how Brazilian security forces were poorly equipped.

=== Provisional government and state of belligerency ===
The December 1963 contingency plan set a condition for logistical support:

If a significant part of the national territory were held by the democratic forces, formation of an alternative provisional government to request help would be highly desirable.

Similarly, at the time of the coup the State Department specified that fuel and ammunition supplies could come only after "the point at which some group having a reasonable claim to legitimacy is able to formally request recognition and assistance from us and if possible from other American republics." The state of insurgency or belligerency would regularize the opposition on a legal level. It was up to Brazilian oppositionists to create this new government, which suggests they were in contact with American plans. The link between this idea and the Brazilian conspiracy was senator Afonso Arinos de Melo Franco.

Magalhães Pinto, governor of Minas Gerais, threw his state into rebellion in conjunction with the local Army garrison at the beginning of the coup d'état. (Note: See, Lacerda, Vitor (2017). O udenismo e Minas Gerais : sujeitos, processos e culturas políticas (1943-1966) (PDF) (Dissertation) (in Brazilian Portuguese). Franca: Unesp. and Pinto, Daniel Cerqueira (2015). General Olympio Mourão Filho: Carreira Político-Militar e Participação nos Acontecimentos de 1964 (PDF) (Dissertation) (in Brazilian Portuguese). Juiz de Fora: UFJF..) The day before, he had named a supra-partisan secretariat "of hermetic unity", including a Secretariat without Portfolio reserved for Afonso Arinos. Once called to Belo Horizonte on the 31st, his function would be that of "chancellor of the revolution", "the first chancellor of the Republic outside Itamaraty", in charge of getting the state of belligerency recognized abroad. According to him, Magalhães first extended this invitation in November 1963, when he mentioned the possibility of a prolonged resistance from Minas Gerais; his actions would allow, for example, the purchase of weapons abroad. According to him,

Magalhães had assumed a national responsibility. And in this case, he thought that he should make within the Liberty Palace a government that also had a national character. (...) my function as secretary without portfolio was to obtain eventual international support for the recognition of our condition of belligerency, in case the effective conditions of the movement that was being prepared reached that point. The recognition of belligerency, as you know well, implies the supply of elements capable of assisting the political movement that is in progress. (Note: Testimony in Jango (1984). Quoted in Ferreira, Jorge; Gomes, Angela de Castro (2014). 1964: O golpe que derrubou um presidente, pôs fim ao regime democrático e instituiu a ditadura no Brasil (in Brazilian Portuguese) (1ª ed.). Rio de Janeiro: Civilização Brasileira., chapter 21.)

The Minas Gerais government intended to use the Port of Vitória to receive foreign arms, especially from the U.S. It obtained the consent of the governor of Espírito Santo and defined that the Military Police of Minas Gerais would defend this logistical corridor. At the time of the rebellion, it organized the "East Detachment" near Rio de Janeiro and Espírito Santo's borders, with the 6th and 11th Infantry Battalions. Nevertheless, a rebellion could be crushed early on, as foreign supplies would take days to arrive. In case of a civil war, Minas Gerais would be at a disadvantage even if it could get arms for 50,000 volunteers. The CIA reported that the Port of Vitória would be needed to receive fuel, and the rebels could control it.

Gordon went as far as to message to several governors about the need for a legitimate government. The CIA reported that in the event of open conflict in Brazil, Argentina would request OAS intervention in Brazil.

Afonso Arinos was relevant during the coup when he informed congressman San Tiago Dantas of his planned involvement. On the morning of April 1, Dantas told Goulart that the US State Department would be willing to recognize a parallel rebel government. This was one of the reasons for the president's departure from Rio de Janeiro.

=== Hypothetical land operation ===
In his conversation with Kennedy in October 1963, Lincoln Gordon mentioned that:

We had a preliminary look, Bob [McNamara], at the question general O’Meara asked at one time: Suppose the country fell under communist control, control of a communist group, and there were really a question of a military invasion to recapture it, what would it take? Well, it was gonna take six divisions, I’ve forgotten how many ships and aircraft and whatnot, I mean, it was a really massive military operation.

Such an operation would far exceed the scale of the presence in Vietnam, where there were 16,300 American troops at the end of 1963. It is comparable to the 1940 "Pot of Gold" plan to land 100,000 men in Brazil. The six-division plan has not yet been declassified. There is a difference of opinion about being part of or distinct from Brother Sam. (Note: Pereira 2018, p. 14 see them as distinct, unlike Fico 2008.) The contingency plan vaguely alluded to the possibility of such an operation in case of external communist interference. The air and naval operation activated during the coup, however, did not include boots on the ground. On March 30, Secretary of State Dean Rusk noted that "in a country of over 75 million people, larger than continental United States, this is not a job for a handful of United States Marines."

According to Carlos Fico, the delivery of supplies to Brazilian ports would still require a small land presence, and in the case of an internal conflict in Brazil it would be possible to find some external communist interference as a pretext for military intervention. In this case it would be necessary to consult the American Congress and the Organization of American States, a "truly shocking scenario". Jacob Gorender noted that the ships were not carrying land contingents, and the growing involvement in Vietnam would make a second front in Brazil difficult. Moniz Bandeira emphasized the possibility of an invasion. Elio Gaspari wrote that "there is no documented record that determined an immediate landing of troops".

=== Final days ===
The operation was planned in cooperation with Brazilians, with general José Pinheiro de Ulhoa Cintra as an intermediary. On March 28, Gordon recorded how logistical concerns were coming from the conspirators and would be specified the following week through contact between general Cintra and military attaché Vernon Walters. In Marco Antonio Villa's interpretation, the operation could have in mind the Castelista coup scheduled for the first half of April, which would allow the ships to be already close to Brazil at the moment of deflagration. On the 27th, a Lincoln Gordon memo predicted the climax of the political crisis in a few days, with Castelo Branco as the leader of the "revolution."

CIA reports in Minas Gerais on the 30th recorded the imminent beginning of the movement. In the early morning hours of the 31st, general Olímpio Mourão Filho, commander of the Brazilian Army in Minas Gerais, precipitated the coup d'état, over the heads of Castelo Branco and the other conspirators in Rio de Janeiro and São Paulo.

== The task force in action ==
=== Beginning ===
At 11:30 AM, a high-level meeting in Washington discussed air and naval support capabilities. In a telegram sent to the Embassy, they defined the dilemma between "not letting an opportunity pass that may not be repeated" and "not putting the U.S. government in charge of a lost cause." In addition to the squadron and fuel supplies proposed by the Embassy, the shipment of arms and ammunition was also approved. At 1:50 PM Rear Admiral John L. Chew ordered the task force with the aircraft carrier USS Forrestal and two guided-missile destroyers to be sent to the vicinity of Santos, where it could receive further orders. In parallel, a helicopter support group would also be sent, embarked on a ship accompanied by four destroyers. These ships belonged to the 4th Aircraft Carrier Division and 162nd and 262nd Destroyer Divisions of the Second Fleet. The Forrestal task force was to depart Norfolk, Virginia, at 07:00 on the 1st, local time (09:00 in Rio de Janeiro). The ships would take a few days to assemble. The carrier task force was expected in the area about April 10 or 11th, and the helicopters, in the 14th.

War ships

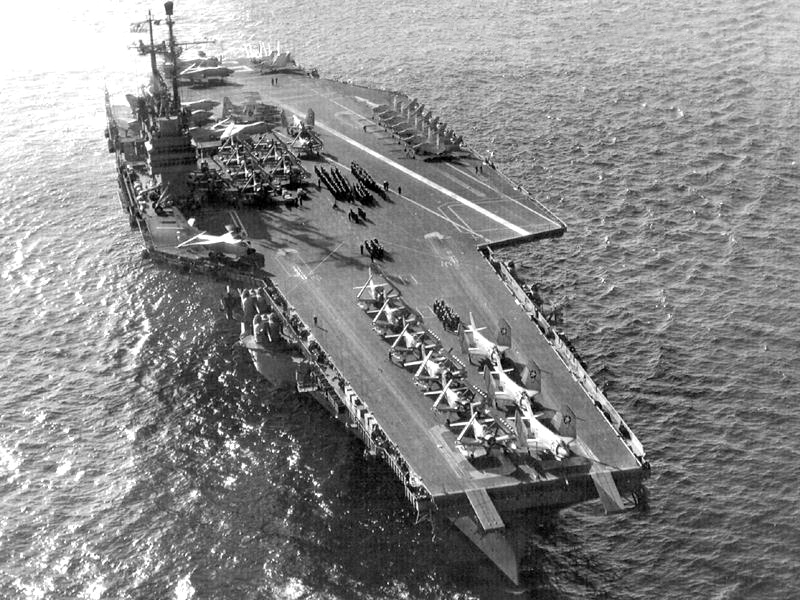
USS Forrestal (CVA-59)

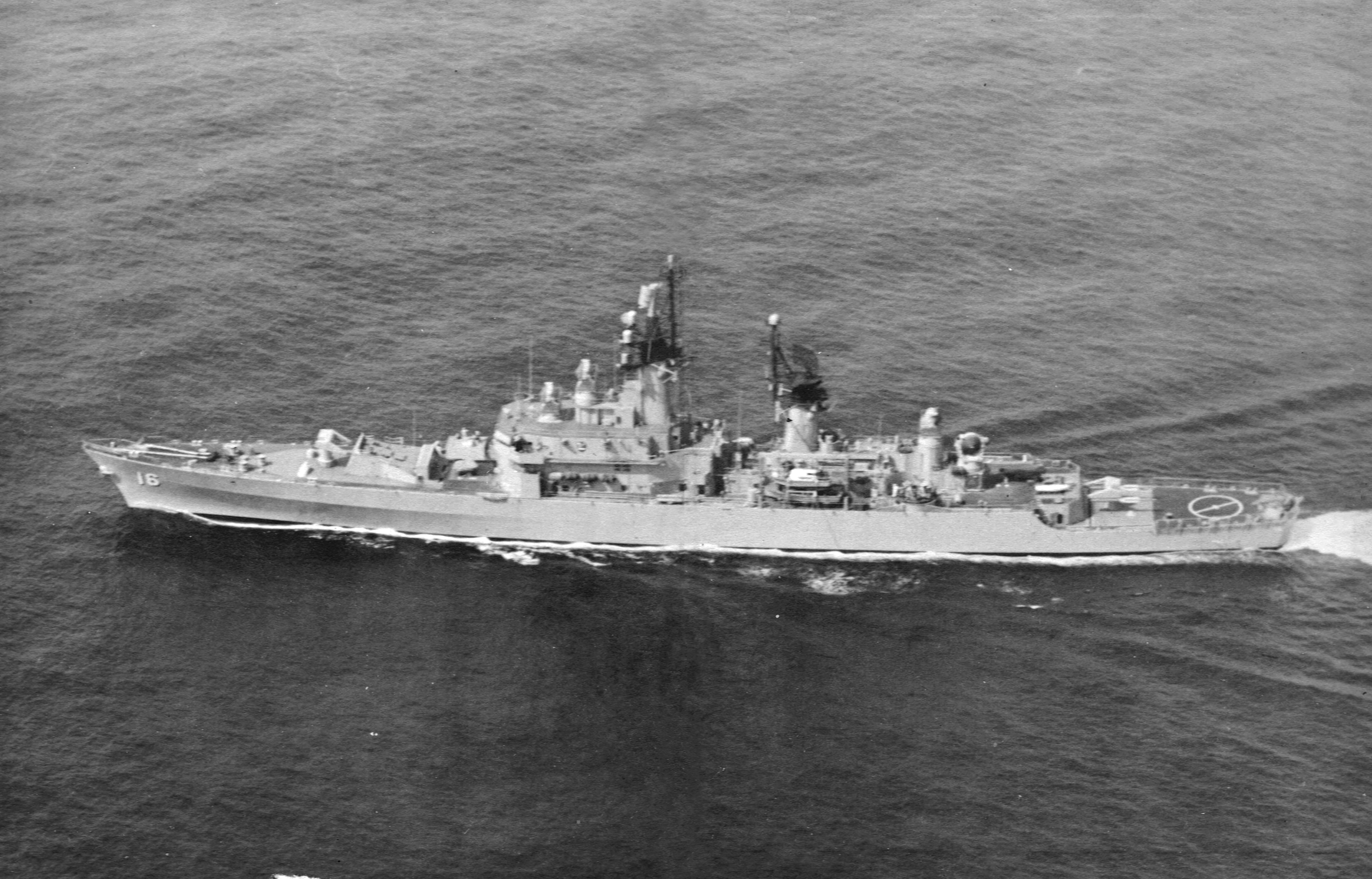
Guided Missile Destroyer USS Leahy (DLG-16)

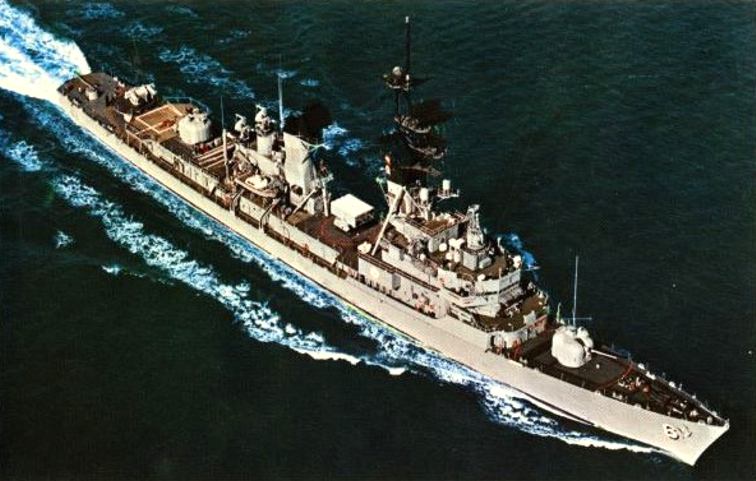
Guided Missile Destroyer USS Barney (DDG-6)

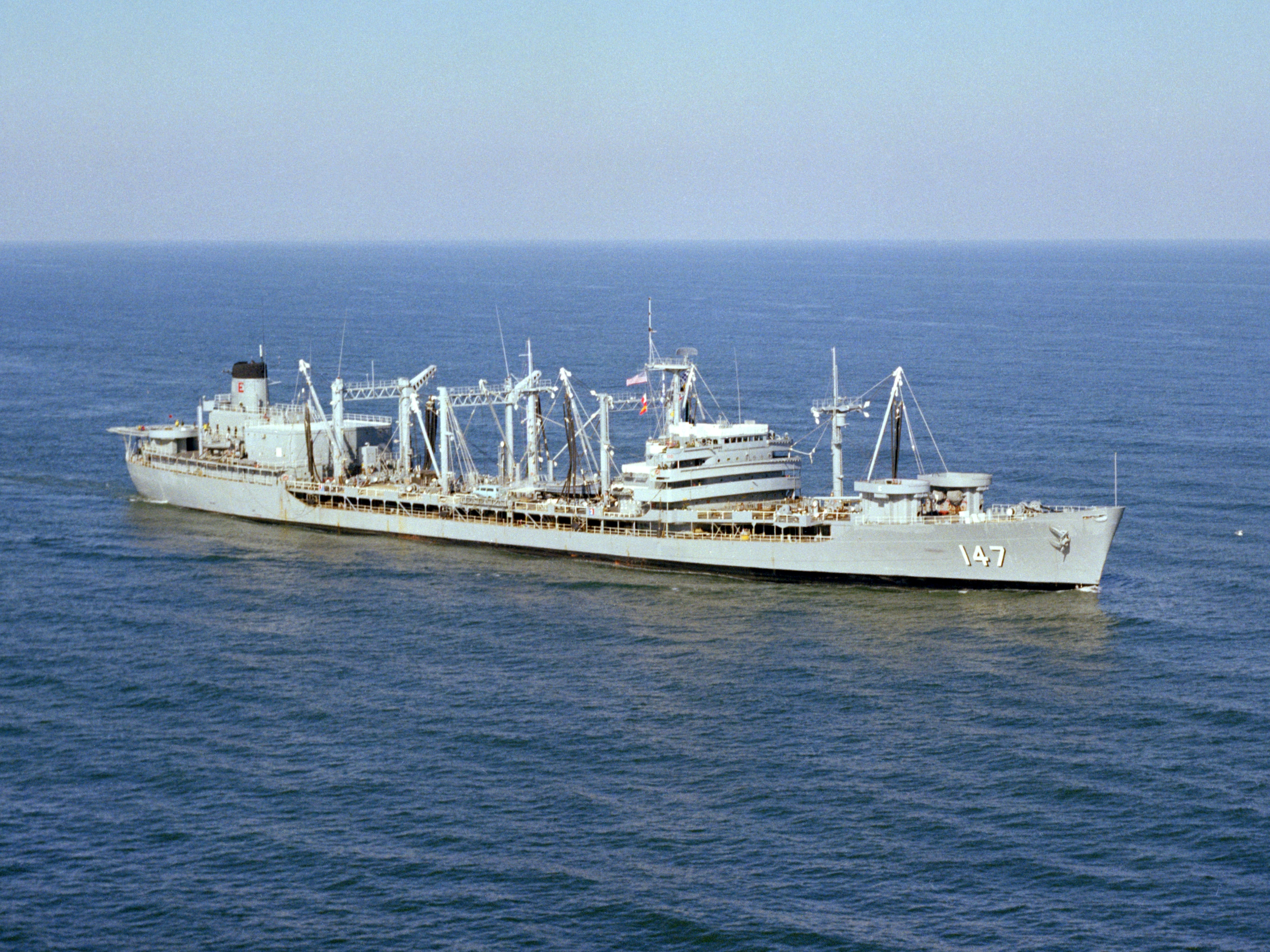
Tanker (Note: Despite this class, it was used to transport helicopters. See Corrêa 1977, p. 35.) USS Truckee (AO-147)

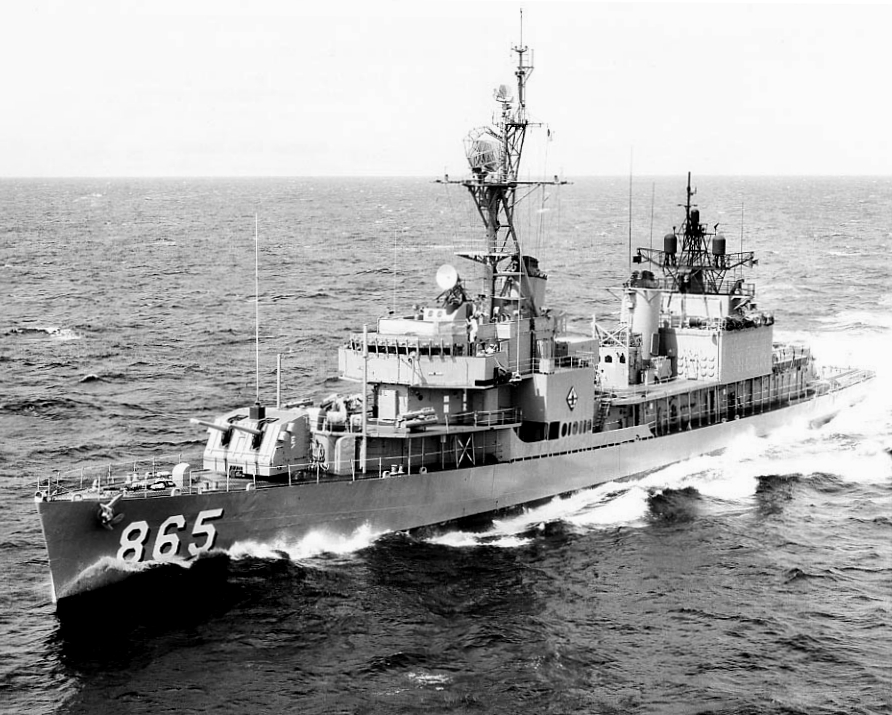
Destroyer USS Charles R. Ware (DD-865)

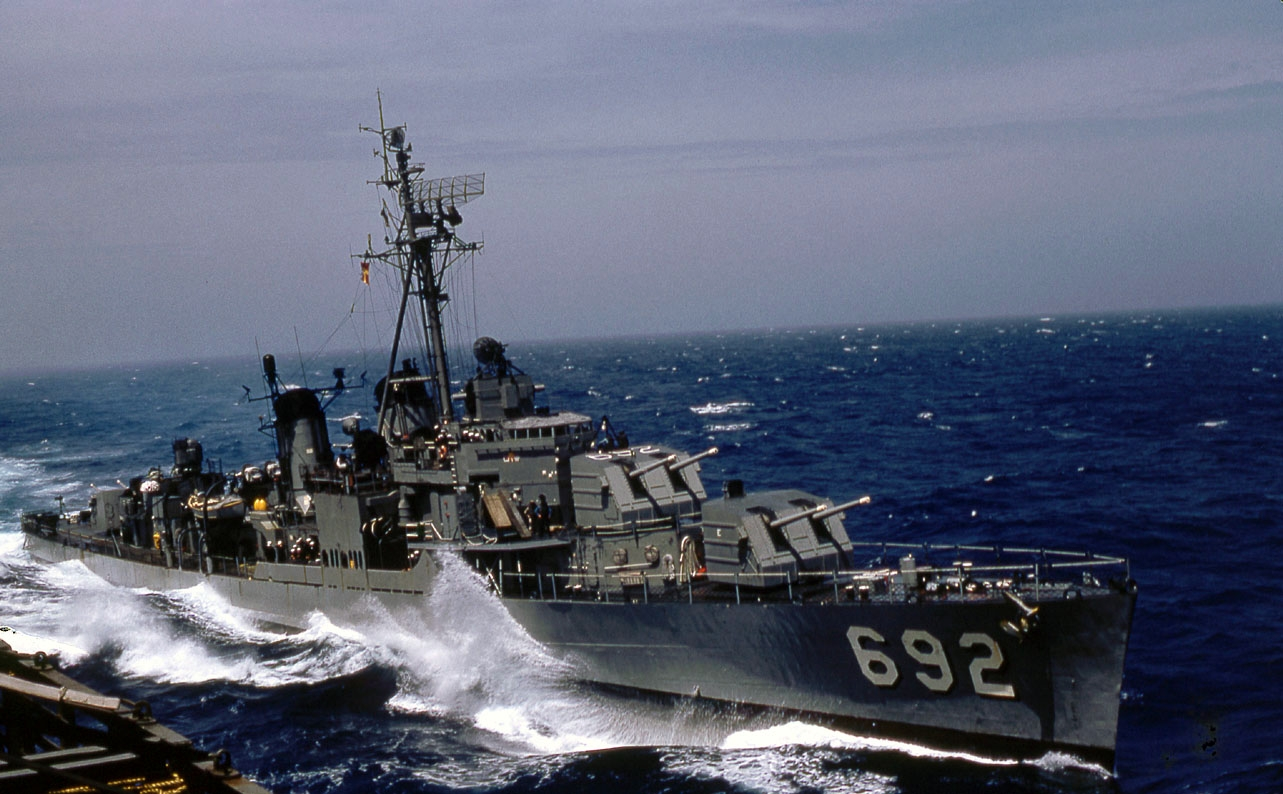
Destroyer USS Allen M. Summer (DD-692)

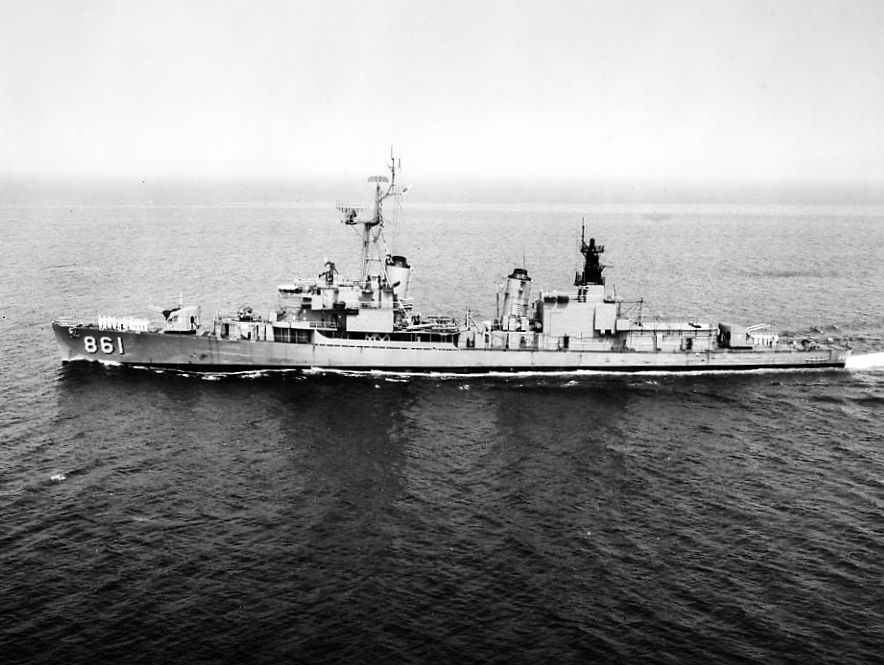
Destroyer USS Harwood (DD-861)

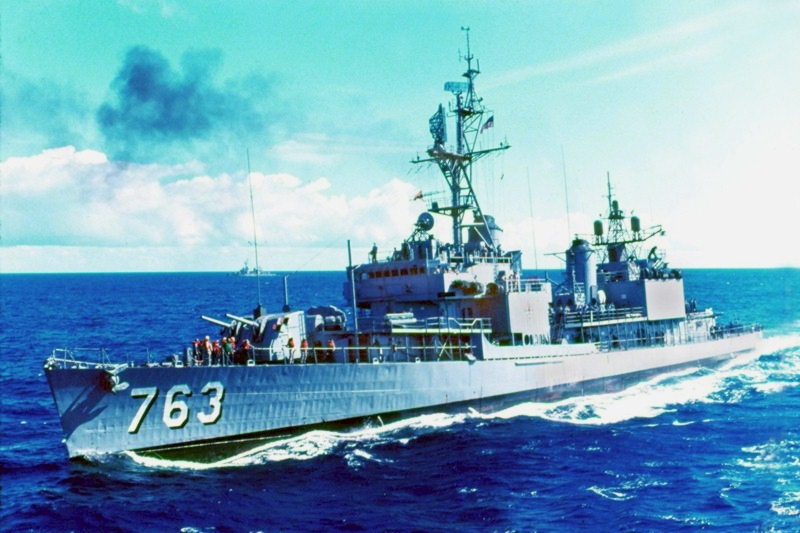
Destroyer USS William C. Lawe (DD-763)

Under secrecy, tankers would be loaded in Aruba starting at 19:00 (Rio de Janeiro time) on the 31st and then sent in the direction of Brazil. Their cargo of common gasoline would be the equivalent of one day's consumption in Brazil at 1977 levels. On the morning of the 2nd, one of them, the Santa Ynez, was ready to leave. It was bound for Montevideo, Uruguay, but on April 10 or 11 it would be near Rio de Janeiro. There was the alternative of transporting fuel by air.

Oil Tanker	It would load in:	Start	It would arrive in Rio in:	Cargo (thousand barrels)				
Oil Tanker	It would load in:	Start	It would arrive in Rio in:	Regular gasoline	Aviation Gasoline 115/145	Jet Fuel JP-4	Diesel Oil	Kerosene
USNS Santa Ynez	Aruba	April 2	April 10/11	40	16		33	20
USNS Chepachet	Aruba	April 4	April 14/15	40	33	35		
SS Hampton Roads	Aruba	April 6	April 14/15			130/150		
SS Nash Bulk	Trinidad	April 7	April 15/16	56	39	70 or 92		
Total (Note: Parker 1977 gives 136 thousand barrels of regular gasoline, 87 thousand barrels of aviation gasoline, 272 thousand barrels of jet fuel, 35 thousand barrels of diesel, and 20 thousand barrels of kerosene.)				136	88	235–277	33	20

For airlift, 250 12 gauge shotguns would be transferred to Ramey Air Force Base in Puerto Rico at 03:00 (Rio de Janeiro time) on the 1st. Meanwhile, by noon (US Eastern time) 110 tons of handguns and ammunition would arrive at McGuire Air Force Base in New Jersey. The aerial contingent would consist of approximately seven C-135 aircraft (six for transport and one for support), eight escort fighters, up to eight tankers, one air relief aircraft, one communications aircraft, and one airborne command post. Tear gas would also be transported for crowd control. Telegram from the State Department to the Embassy on March 31 determined that if conditions for shipment existed, it would take 24 to 36 hours and would be destined for Campinas. Another telegram expected a landing in Recife.

Air Force General George S. Brown was designated the mission commander, while General Breitweiser, head of air forces in the Southern Command, commanded the Southern Command's Joint Task Force. Starting at 07:00 (09:00 Rio time), this task force, with officers from the United States Army, Navy, Air Force, and CIA met at the Air Force Base in Panama to coordinate the logistics of the operation.

=== Cancellation ===
On the 1st of April, senior officials in Washington, concerned about the possibility of open support for the rebellion benefiting Goulart, asked the Embassy whether "the momentum would continue on the anti-Goulart side without covert or overt encouragement from us." Lincoln Gordon replied that "the momentum clearly picked up" and open support would be a political error. He added that Ademar de Barros, governor of São Paulo, and others from his state had requested fuel and an overt naval presence, but they were not important. The Americans were well informed of the course of events in Brazil and in contact with Castelo Branco. The latter told Gordon that he did not need logistical support, and from then on the operation began to be dismantled. At 5:30 pm, the ambassador reported from the "95% victorious democratic rebellion".

In a report sent at 01:00 in the morning on the 2nd, Gordon clarified that fuel and armaments might still be needed, since control over the refineries was not yet guaranteed and there was still resistance in the Third Army. At 16:00, Castelo Branco confirmed that the last military resistance in the Third Army was over. The order to disband the Joint Task Force came at 17:22, going into effect at 20:00. At 16:30 (Rio time) on the 3rd, it was determined that "the current situation in Brazil will not require the presence of the Task Force with aircraft carriers in ocean waters to the south of the country", as suggested by Gordon in the middle of the previous day.

The operation became the "Quick Kick" exercise, after which the ships returned to business as usual. The Forrestal's logbook shows how the carrier left Hampton Roads on April 1, headed 17º N 60º W (Note: East of the Lesser Antilles.) and came back, anchoring on the 8th. On the 3rd, Dean Rusk informed Gordon that with the operation's deactivation, costs of $2.3 million for the tankers would not be covered by the budget and might have to be reimbursed by Brazil, but this did not occur. In the afternoon general O'Meara dismissed the air commands, keeping only the movement of fuel. In the evening, the Joint Chiefs of Staff cancelled air and fuel transport. Tankers continued moving until April 4 or 5, while weapons and ammunition remained at bases until April 7.

== Discovery ==
After the coup, some evidence of an American military operation emerged. Brazilianist Thomas Skidmore mentioned in an article at the time that Brazilian conspirators requested material support from American diplomats. Four years later, during an interview by Carlos Lacerda on the television program Firing Line, a sailor in the audience stated that at the time his ship was ordered to follow to Brazil. (Note: Firing Line, November 13, 1967, 41 minutes.) Some conspirators also made mention of it, such as Mourão Filho, who admitted knowing about the possible approach of a squadron. However, Lincoln Gordon and Vernon Walters denied there was anything more than veiled monitoring of events.

In the words of Elio Gaspari, "the American fleet was only sighted twelve years later". The operation came to light through historian Phyllis R. Parker. As part of her master's program, begun in 1974, she accessed newly released documents at the Lyndon B. Johnson Library. With Gordon's own help interpreting the documents, she found events missing from the history books of Skidmore and John W. F. Dulles and in contradiction to the official version of American officials. Journalist Marcos Sá Corrêa also examined the documents and published articles in Jornal do Brasil, which were later included in the book 1964 visto e comentado pela Casa Branca ("1964 seen and commented by the White House"). On the 40th and 50th anniversaries of the coup in 2004 and 2014, the National Security Archive published additional records on the operation itself and American policy on Brazil in the previous two years.

== See also ==
- Operation Condor
- Operation Farroupilha
- United States involvement in regime change
- United States involvement in regime change in Latin America
