= José Paulo Netto =

Brazilian writer and academic

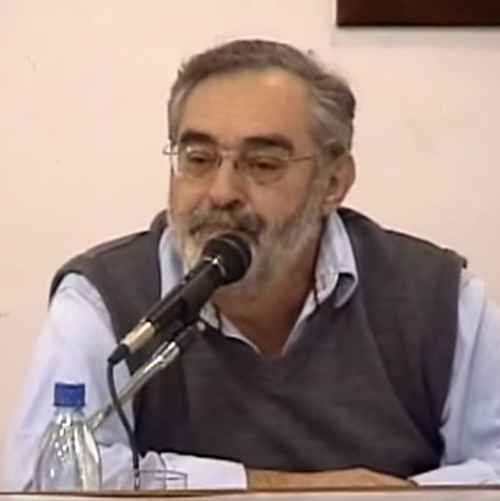
- Netto at an event at Unesp in Marília in 2009.
- Born: November 29, 1947 (age 78); Juiz de Fora, Minas Gerais, Brazil
- Education: Federal University of Juiz de Fora
- Occupations: Professor, social worker, writer

José Paulo Netto (born November 29, 1947) is a Brazilian writer, social worker and university teacher, known for his reception and dissemination of György Lukács in Brazil, and later for his studies of the work of Karl Marx.

He is Professor Emeritus of the Federal University of Rio de Janeiro (UFRJ) and Doctor Honoris Causa of the Universidad Nacional del Centro de la Provincia de Buenos Aires, has a degree and a doctorate in Social Work. He is also a professor at the UFRJ.

A member of the Brazilian Communist Party (PCB), Netto is currently one of the main researchers of Karl Marx 's works in Brazil and is also responsible for translations of texts by classic authors such as Friedrich Engels and Vladmir Lenin.

== Biography ==
=== First years and education ===
Born in Juiz de Fora, a city in the interior of Minas Gerais, in 1947, Netto grew up in the Vitorino Braga neighborhood. In the city, he graduated in social work from the Federal University of Juiz de Fora (UFJF) in 1969. In 1973, he graduated in bachelor of Letters from the same institution.

=== Career ===
In 1972, he began working at UFJF. Opposed to the Brazilian military dictatorship in 1975, he had to go into exile, where during this period he worked as a lecturer at the Lisbon Institute of Social Service and the Lisbon Higher Institute of Economics in Portugal. After the Amnesty Law, he returned to Brazil in 1979 and moved to São Paulo, where he joined the Pontifical Catholic University of São Paulo (PUC-SP). At PUC-SP, under the guidance of sociologist Octavio Ianni, he defended his doctoral thesis, Autocracia burguesa e Serviço Social (in literal English translation: Bourgeois Autocracy and Social Service), in 1990.

He moved to the city of Rio de Janeiro in 1987, where he began teaching as a guest professor at Federal University of Rio de Janeiro (UFRJ) and later became a full professor in 1992.

Netto translated works by Karl Marx, Friedrich Engels and Marxist authors, as well as preparing anthologies of Marx-Engels and György Lukács. He gained ground in the public debate for his contribution to the dissemination of the Marxist tradition in Brazil, and is considered to have a didactic and non-reductionist way of communicating.

In November 2020, he released a biography of Karl Marx, entitled Karl Marx, a biography, by publisher Boitempo.

=== Political views ===
Netto joined the Brazilian Communist Party (PCB) in 1963, where he remained until January 1992 before the split that led to the founding of the Popular Socialist Party (PPS). With the reorganization of the party after the Tenth Congress, he continued to collaborate in various activities, especially political formulation, although he formally left. On December 4, 2009, Netto made his return to the PCB official.

== Works ==
- Lukács e a crítica da filosofia burguesa (1978)
- Capitalismo e reificação (1981)
- O que é stalinismo (1981)
- Georg Lukács: o guerreiro sem repouso (1983)
- O que é marxismo (1985)
- O que todo cidadão precisa saber sobre comunismo (1986)
- Portugal: do fascismo à revolução (1986)
- Cotidiano: conhecimento e crítica (1987)
- Democracia e transição socialista: escritos de teoria e política (1990)
- Ditadura e Serviço Social: Uma análise do Serviço Social no Brasil pós-64 (1990)
- Capitalismo monopolista e Serviço Social (1992)
- Crise do socialismo e ofensiva neoliberal (1993)
- Marxismo impenitente: contribuição à história das idéias marxistas (2004)
- Economia politica: uma introdução crítica (2006)
- Introdução ao estudo do método de Marx (2010)
- Nelson Werneck Sodré: o general da história e da cultura (2011)
- O Leitor de Marx (2012)
- Pequena história da ditadura brasileira (1964-1985) (2014)
- Curso livre Marx-Engels: A criação destruidora, volume 1 (2015)
- José Paulo Netto: ensaios de um marxista sem repouso (2017)
- Karl Marx: Uma biografia (2020)
- Lukács: uma introdução (2023)

== Honors ==
- 2012 – Doctor Honoris Causa by National University of Buenos Aires Central.
- 2017 – Pedro Ernesto Medal, awarded by the Municipal Chamber of Rio de Janeiro, through Councilman Renato Cinco (PSOL).
