= Rogê Ferreira =

Brazilian lawyer and politician

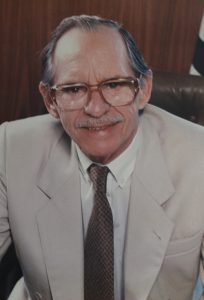
- Rogê in 1987

State Deputy of São Paulo
- In office February 1, 1950 – January 31, 1954

Federal Deputy for São Paulo
- In office February 1, 1955 – April 9, 1964

Personal details
- Born: January 1, 1922 São Paulo, São Paulo, Brazil
- Died: June 29, 1991 (aged 69) São Paulo, São Paulo, Brazil
- Party: PSB (1950–1964); PDT (1982–1985); PSB (1985–1991)
- Education: University of São Paulo
- Profession: Lawyer

José Antonio de Affonseca Rogê Ferreira (January 1, 1922 – June 29, 1991) was a Brazilian politician of progressive and nationalist lineage, having been an exponent of the Brazilian Socialist Party (PSB) in the period before the military coup of 1964.

== Biography ==
=== Early years and studies ===
Born in the city of São Paulo, he graduated in Law from the University of São Paulo, at the traditional Largo do São Francisco Law School. In 1948, he became president of the Academic Center XI de Agosto and, soon after, the first president of the São Paulo State Student Union (UEE).

After his mandate, he became president of the National Union of Students (UNE), the national organization of Brazilian students, in July 1949, with a mandate until July 1950. He resigned three months before the end of his term to pursue his candidacy for state representative for the Brazilian Socialist Party (PSB). Elected, he became the leader of his party's caucus.

=== Federal Deputy ===
In 1954, he was elected to the Federal deputy for São Paulo. This time, he also took over the leadership of the PSB. In 1955 he ran for mayor of São Paulo, finishing fourth.

As a member of parliament, he acted in defense of workers, civil liberties and national interests. He was involved in the laws that granted job stability to pregnant women and union leaders, as well as those that regulated various professions. He was also the author of the law that regulated the profession of librarian in Brazil.

In the early hours of April 2, 1964, while the then president João Goulart, besieged by the military uprising, was still in the country, the president of the Federal Senate, Auro de Moura Andrade, in an extraordinary session declared the presidency of the Republic vacant and immediately closed the session. As he was leaving, Rogê physically assaulted Andrede with two spits, while his colleague, Tancredo Neves, called Andrade a “scoundrel, scoundrel”'.

Shortly after the establishment of the Brazilian Military Dictatorship, Rogê Ferreira had his mandate revoked and his political rights suspended by Institutional Act No. 1.

=== Resumption of political activity ===
After the Amnesty Law, he returned to politics in 1982, when he ran for governor of the state of São Paulo for the Democratic Labor Party (PDT), of which he became state president. Despite his good performance in the televised debates between the candidates, he came fifth and last in the election. In the debate promoted by TV Bandeirantes, Rogê questioned the Workers' Party (PT) candidate, Lula, “Lula, after all, are you a socialist, a communist or a worker?” and Lula replied “I'm a lathe operator”.

In these elections, despite being an opponent, he maintained good relations with the winning candidate, Franco Montoro of the Brazilian Democratic Movement Party (PMDB).

In 1985, he returned to his old party, the Brazilian Socialist Party, which had just been reformed with the end of the military dictatorship. At the end of that year, he ran for mayor of São Paulo; however, during the televised campaign, he withdrew from the race in favor of Fernando Henrique Cardoso (PMDB), who would be defeated by former president Jânio Quadros (PTB).

The following year, he tried to return to the Federal Chamber, whose new legislature would form the National Constituent Assembly. Despite his excellent voting record – after receiving 72,538 votes, one of the twenty-five largest in the state and one of the ten largest in the capital – he didn't get elected because the PSB didn't reach the hare quota.

From that election onwards, which would be his last, he led the regional alignment of his party, the PSB, with the São Paulo PMDB, then led by Orestes Quércia, who was elected governor. During the Quércia administration, Rogê took over the presidency of the state-owned Cetesb; in return, as president of the PSB's regional office, he announced his support for João Leiva, Quércia's candidate in the 1988 mayoral election in São Paulo. As a result, the PSB's regional office in São Paulo suffered an intervention from the PSB's national office, which had decided to support the PT's candidate, Luiza Erundina.

=== Death ===
Rogê died at the age of 69, after three weeks hospitalized in the UniCor Hospital in the Morumbi neighborhood of São Paulo, from a lung infection that triggered sepsis. In his honor, a school in the Jaraguá district of São Paulo bears his name. In the city of Campinas, in the interior of the state of São Paulo, a multi-sports court bears his name.

== Sports ==
Rogê Ferreira was also active in sport, serving on the board of Sport Club Corinthians Paulista. He was also president of the National Sports Council.
