= Elio Gaspari =

Brazilian journalist and writer

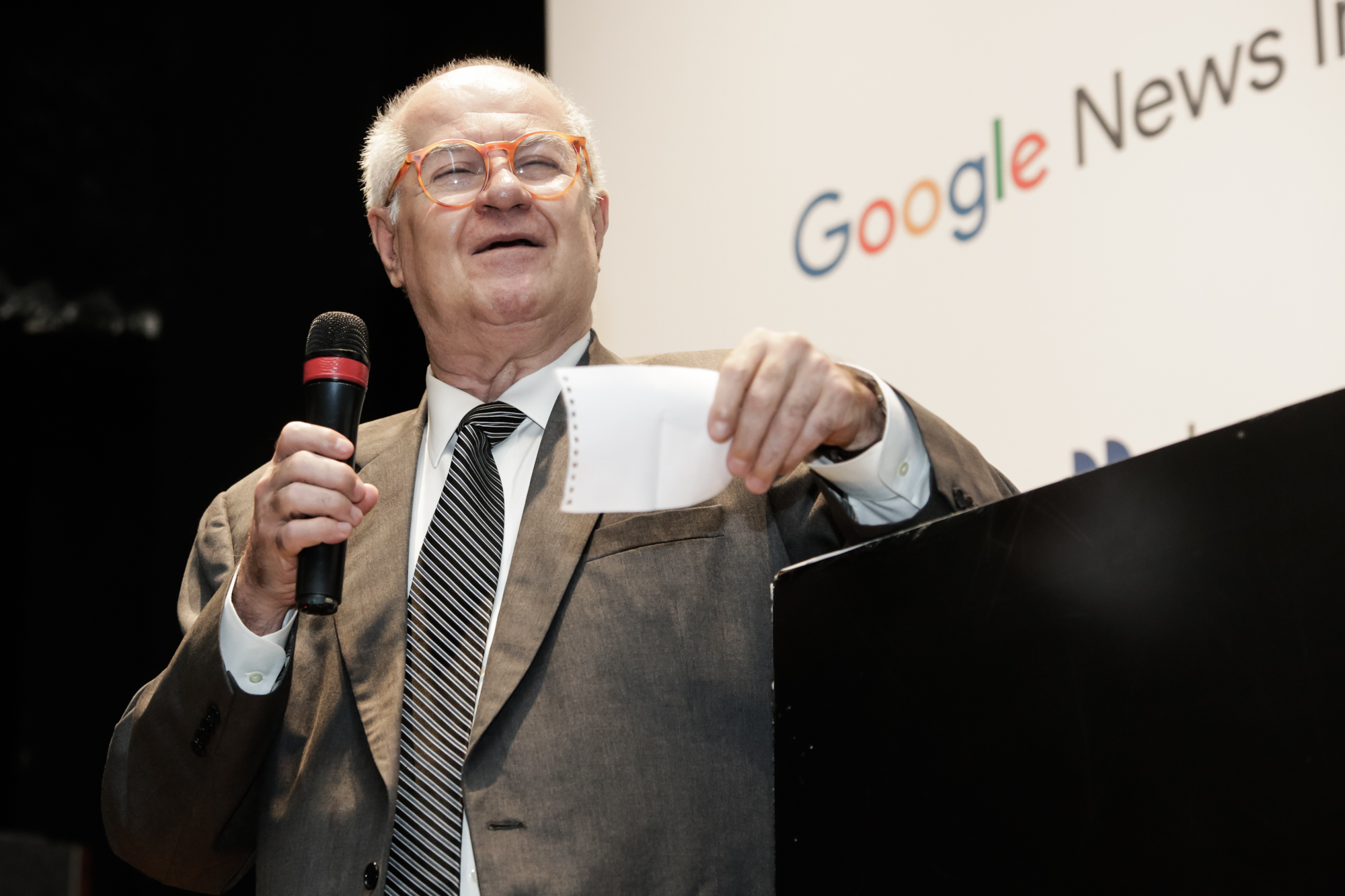
Elio Gaspari

Elio Gaspari (born 1944 in Naples, Italy) is a Brazilian journalist and writer resident in São Paulo, Brazil. He moved to Brazil while still an infant, and began his career in journalism not long thereafter. He is well known for his political opinion column in the Folha de S.Paulo newspaper, which is syndicated to many other newspapers, and for his most recent work, an authoritative historical account of the Brazilian military dictatorship in five volumes.

== Works ==
- A Ditadura Envergonhada, Vol. 1
- A Ditadura Escancarada, Vol. 2
- A Ditadura Derrotada, Vol. 3
- A Ditadura Encurralada, Vol. 4
- A Ditadura Acabada, Vol. 5
