= Automóvel Clube do Brasil =

Extinct organization in Brazil

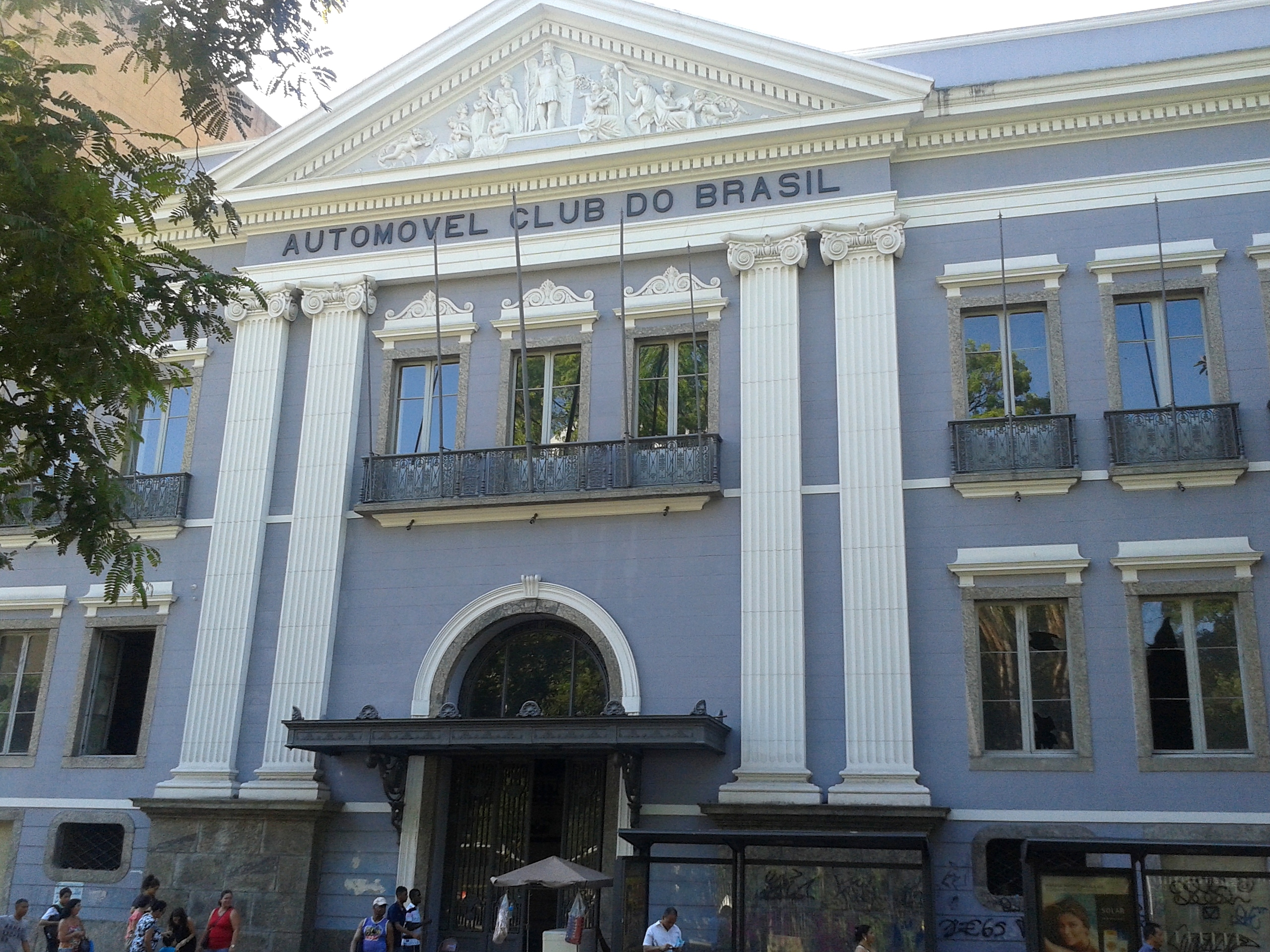
View of the facade of the historic headquarters.

The Automóvel Clube do Brasil, founded as the Automóvel Club do Brasil, is an automobile entity created in Rio de Janeiro in 1907 and responsible, among other activities, for the realization of the Grand Prix of the city of Rio de Janeiro.

== History ==
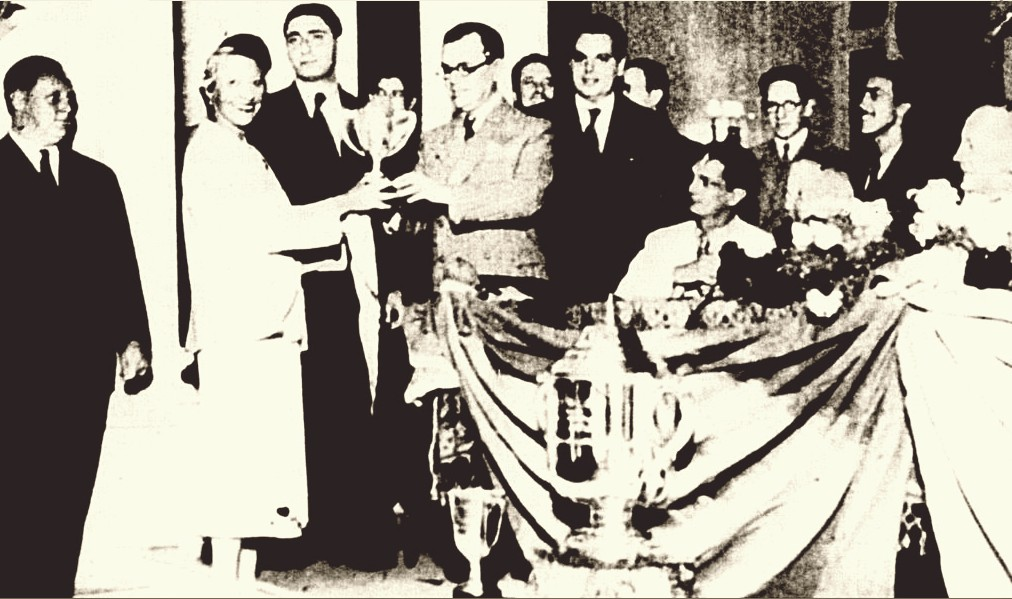
French driver Hellé Nice receives a trophy at the Automóvel Clube for her participation in the 1936 GP.

The Automóvel Clube do Brasil was founded on September 27, 1907, as Automóvel Club do Brasil, and officially recognized by the federal government in 1908.

The club fulfilled a demand of the elite of Rio de Janeiro in the first decades of the 20th century, which, emerging from the monarchy and under strong English cultural influence, sought to create spaces of sociability where they could exercise the social hierarchy and, in this specific case, promote automobile culture as a means of transportation, leisure and sport.

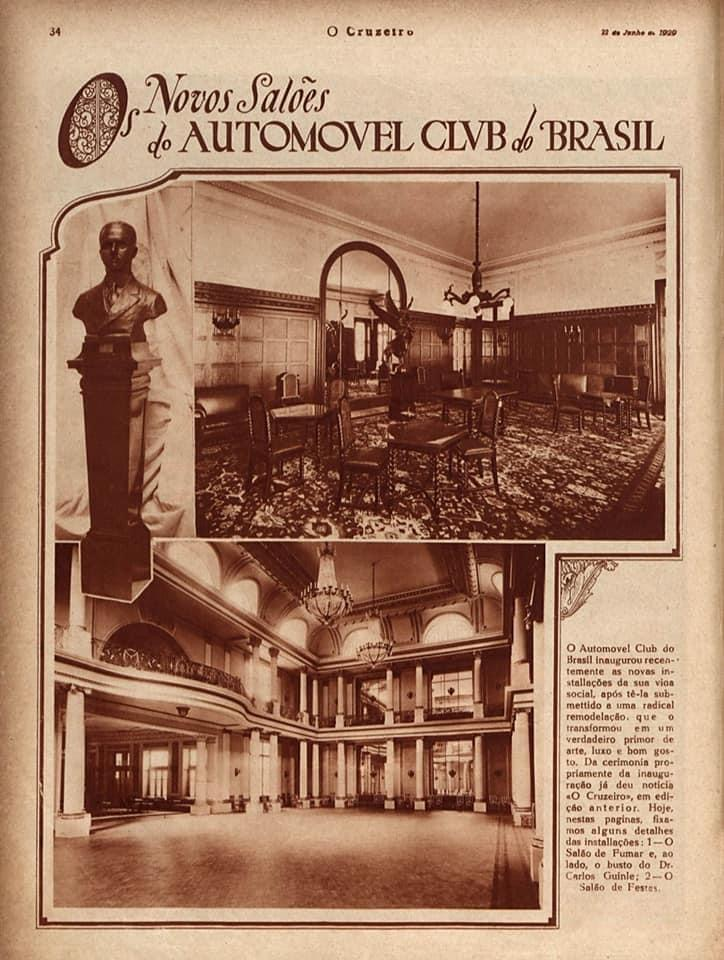
The salons of the Automóvel Clube in the magazine O Cruzeiro of June 22, 1929.

The headquarters of the club acquired great historical importance for Brazil because it was the location where the then President João Goulart gave, on March 30, 1964, a speech in response to military officers who criticized him for his support of the sailors' revolt. This speech, which triggered the Military Coup that placed Brazil in a dictatorial period, happened during a tribute paid to him by sergeants of the Brazilian Army Combatant NCO Academy and military police in the celebration of the 40th anniversary of the Association of Sub-Lieutenants and Sergeants of the Military Police.

After the extinction of the club, the headquarters, with the facade intact, housed a hotel and also an investment company. In 2008, it served as a set for filming by director Luiz Fernando Carvalho.

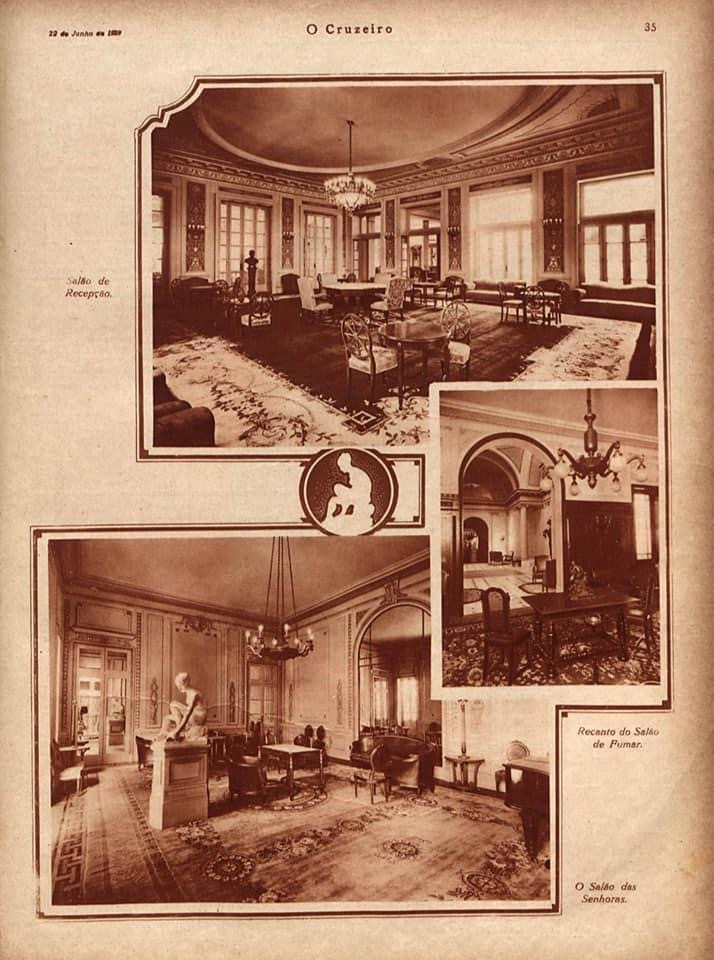
Continuation of the article on the salons of the Automóvel Clube in the magazine O Cruzeiro of June 22, 1929.

== See also ==
- Meeting at Automóvel Clube
- Automotive industry in Brazil
- Brazilian Automobile Confederation
