= Meeting at Automóvel Clube =

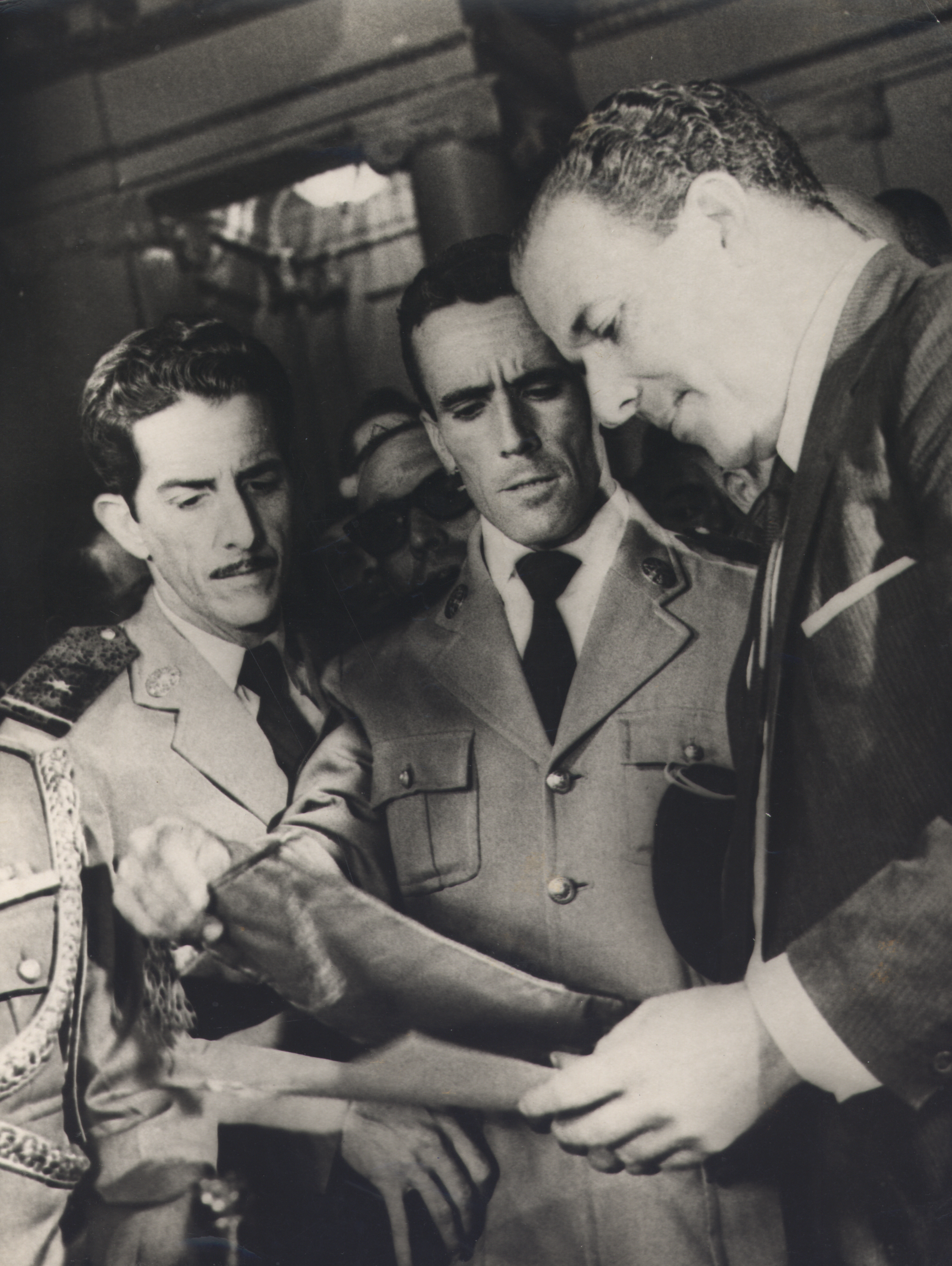
- Goulart (right), during the meeting
- Date: March 30, 1964 (62 years ago)
- Location: Automóvel Clube do Brasil
- Type: Meeting

The meeting at the Automóvel Clube was a solemnity of sergeants of the Military Police and Armed Forces of Brazil, on March 30, 1964, in Rio de Janeiro, at which President João Goulart gave a speech. Taking place amid the repercussions of the 1964 Sailors' Revolt, it was one of the immediate factors in the coup d'état that began the following day.

Days earlier, the movements of enlisted men, (the lower ranks of the military), whose support the president sought, had been at the center of a mutiny in the Navy, and Goulart's response had been deemed insufficient by the opposition and the military. However, the president did not back down, and although warned that his appearance would be political provocation, he met with the sergeants and the same sailors as the previous days. In his speech, considered by most authors to be the most radical, he insisted that the base reforms would be achieved, pointed out the impending coup d'état and defended himself from the criticism that he was an enemy of military discipline and hierarchy, transferring this accusation to his enemies. The repercussion was negative among the officers, who disagreed with his definition of discipline and saw a breach of hierarchy in his direct relationship with the enlisted men.

The speech was one of the factors that prevented an effective reaction by legalistic military to the coup d'état. With the fall of the president, the event thus represented one of the final moments of the Populist Republic and of Goulart's public career.

== Attendance ==
The month of March 1964 was a turning point for the Goulart government, marking the president's commitment to the left and the strengthening of his opposition. The mild reaction to the Sailors' Revolt discredited the government among military officers, and the ongoing conspiracies were about to materialize into a coup d'état. On the 28th the leaders of the conspirators in Minas Gerais met for their final preparations, while General Castelo Branco's group defined on the 29th that the overthrow of the president would be on April 2.

The celebration of the 40th anniversary of the Military Police Lieutenants and Sergeants Association was scheduled for the 30th at the Automóvel Clube and the president was invited. Although such a solemnity was commonplace and had already been scheduled well in advance, the circumstances gave the event a new connotation: it was a meeting with military subalterns in the midst of the repercussions of a subaltern mutiny, led by a president who wanted to have a support base among the sergeants to react to a possible attack by the officers.

Several advisors warned Goulart against attending, as did legalistic military personnel, such as Brigadier Francisco Teixeira. The president's press secretary, Raul Ryff, and deputies Tancredo Neves, Doutel de Andrade, and Tenório Cavalcanti were against. For Tancredo, the president ought to send a representative, but his personal presence would be a political provocation; to attend, "only if the president were on the eve of an armed struggle and troops would leave from there for combat." In those circumstances, attendance would be in the eyes of the officerate a continuation of the breach of discipline and hierarchy. However, Goulart felt supported by the military apparatus of General Assis Brasil, did not want to show weakness and "believed that, whether he attended or not, his attitude would not change the course of events."

The president arrived before 8:00 pm, in the presence of his wife Maria Thereza and the ministers Assis Brasil, of the Military Cabinet, Abelardo Jurema, of Justice, Wilson Fadul, of Health, Amaury Silva, of Labor, Expedito Machado, of Transportation and Public Works, Anísio Botelho, of Aeronautics, and Paulo Mário da Cunha Rodrigues, of the Navy.

Out of 26,000 sergeants in Rio de Janeiro, the organizers expected 10,000, but only around two thousand showed up. Abelardo Jurema notes that the two thousand present were not two thousand military personnel, as their families and civilians were also in the hall. Of those present, it is likely that Military Police members predominated. The Army presence was minimal, as the commanders did not allow them to leave their barracks. There were no disciplinary incidents against this measure. The presence of the military police was relevant due to the fact that their corporation was the armed wing of the opposition governor Carlos Lacerda. Sailors, corporals, and marines also attended, and two figures of the crisis in the Navy, José Anselmo dos Santos, "Corporal Anselmo," and Cândido Aragão, commander of the Marine Corps, were prominently present. Among those present were members of the General Workers' Command, Unity and Action Pact, Popular Action and Workers' Politics, and Brizolists, Communists and Nationalists.

== Speeches ==
In addition to the president, several other speakers gave speeches, among them Abelardo Jurema and José Anselmo dos Santos. Sergeant and deputy Antônio Garcia Filho spoke of "rejecting the alienated and reactionary cupolas," while sub-lieutenant Antônio Sena Pires defined, "We fight against alien exploitation and contribute to the politicization of the Brazilian people, who no longer tolerate colonizing foreign capital or foreign and domestic trusts." Other sergeants spoke in support of changes to the Constitution, social reforms, and changes in military regulations, and declared their support for the president and the unity of the pro-reform sectors.

Goulart's speech began after 10:00 PM and by 11:35 PM he was back at the Laranjeiras Palace. His words were broadcast over radio and television, with the television broadcast restricted to Rio de Janeiro. He spoke "tense, with dark circles under his eyes," with "a worried, tired, embarrassed physiognomy," speaking with indecision, lacking "the precision and seductive tone quite well known." He took a more moderate text, written "by several hands, among which those of Raul Ryff and Jorge Serpa," or written in large part by Luís Carlos Prestes, but he spoke by improvisation.

The possibility of a coup d'état was made explicit, and Goulart went on the offensive. The first term used was "crisis", which he blamed on sectors of the elite and foreign investors opposed to his proposals. He denounced the action of the Brazilian Institute for Democratic Action, which had financed conservative politicians, and refuted the criticism that he was against the family and the Catholic Church and attacked the "saboteurs" and "reactionaries". He talked about his base reforms, but the most important topics were his relationship with the sergeants and military hierarchy and discipline.

While justifying his response to the Sailors' Revolt, he declared himself a defender of the cohesion of the Armed Forces, responding to criticisms such as those enunciated by Castelo Branco. He called the coup plotters true violators of discipline and hierarchy, recalling that some of them, in 1961, had arrested sergeants and officers (such as Marshall Henrique Teixeira Lott) who defended legality. (Note: See Campanha da Legalidade#Events in Guanabara.) Defined discipline as being based on mutual respect and, insisting that the sergeants obey the legal hierarchy, alluded to a bond with him, and not with the officers, in case they practiced "sectarianism" or opposed the "feelings of the Brazilian people". He assured that, despite the opposition, the base reforms would be achieved, and "No one can be fooled anymore by a coup against the government, against the people." He concluded:

I will not admit the coup of the reactionaries. The coup we want is the coup of the base reforms, so necessary to our country. We don't want a closed Congress. On the contrary, we want an open Congress. We only want the congressmen to be sensitive to the minimum popular demands.

The president "didn't even look like the conciliatory Jango so fought by the left". A good part of the authors consider the speech as a radicalization and even as a political suicide, as Thomas Skidmore, for whom the tone was one of a "belligerent farewell prayer" in which he "refused to shirk responsibility for the attacks on military discipline." and Marco Antonio Villa, whose assessment is that it was a testament to provide the basis for a future return to politics. An alternative interpretation is that the purpose of the speech would instead be to preserve the president's mandate through the support of the sergeants.

== Reactions ==
The Ultima Hora hit the stands the next day with optimistic assessments, although its founder Samuel Wainer wrote in his memoirs that he was opposed to the president's appearance. Luís Carlos Prestes, general secretary of the Communist Party, evaluated eighteen years later that the event was "an inversion of the entire hierarchy and facilitated the coup". Senator Ernâni do Amaral Peixoto, after hearing the speech, judged that "Jango is no longer president of the Republic". Legalist and Nationalist officers realized the seriousness of the situation and were upset. The Minister of Aeronautics, who was at the meeting, later ordered the arrest of one of the sergeants for his speech. Lieutenant Colonel Alfredo Arraes de Alencar, who was serving in the Secretariat of the National Security Council, saw a coup as certain.

In military memory, the event is remembered as one of the motivating events for the neutral majority of officers to join the coup. The meeting appears together with the Sergeants' Revolt of 1963 and, in 1964, the Sailors' Revolt and the Central Rally. Added to these events, the impression of the officers, including the legalists, was that the president himself encouraged military indiscipline. His definition of discipline - the product of mutual respect - was not that which exists in the Armed Forces, where its basis is obedience. The officers' concept of discipline did not include, as Goulart intended, the political participation of his commanders. Hierarchical concepts were also hurt, as the president addressed the lower ranks directly to question what the higher ranks were doing.

The conspirators, in turn, liked the speech for pushing the other officers against the president, as was the opinion of Ernesto Geisel, who attended it together with Golbery do Couto e Silva and Castelo Branco. They were just waiting for a pretext to overthrow the president. At 05:00 on the 31st, in Juiz de Fora, General Olímpio Mourão Filho launched the offensive with a series of phone calls. Shortly after the coup, he defined the meeting at the Automóvel Clube as the trigger for his decision, understanding also present among historians. (Note: Skidmore 1982, p. 362: "One of the spectators, an old military conspirator, thought the time had come to act." Ruiz 2018, p. 52: "In Minas Gerais, the solemnity served as a fuse to indicate the coup movement, and in the early morning of March 31, the Civil-Military Coup began.") In his memoirs, he recounted having realized after dinner that he would have to leave at dawn the next day. Afterwards, he watched the speech on television at his wife's insistence. His decision consisted of extensive preparations and not a passionate gesture.

The sergeants' support did not materialize during the coup, and their hierarchical obedience in the Army was maintained, with the rapid collapse of the government's military situation. The meeting has already been called the "last act of the João Goulart Government and the Fifth Republic", as well as Jango's last public appearance, although his words at the airport in Brasília on the evening of April 1 are also cited as his last in public.
