= Soledad Barrett Viedma =

Paraguayan militant activist (1945–1973)

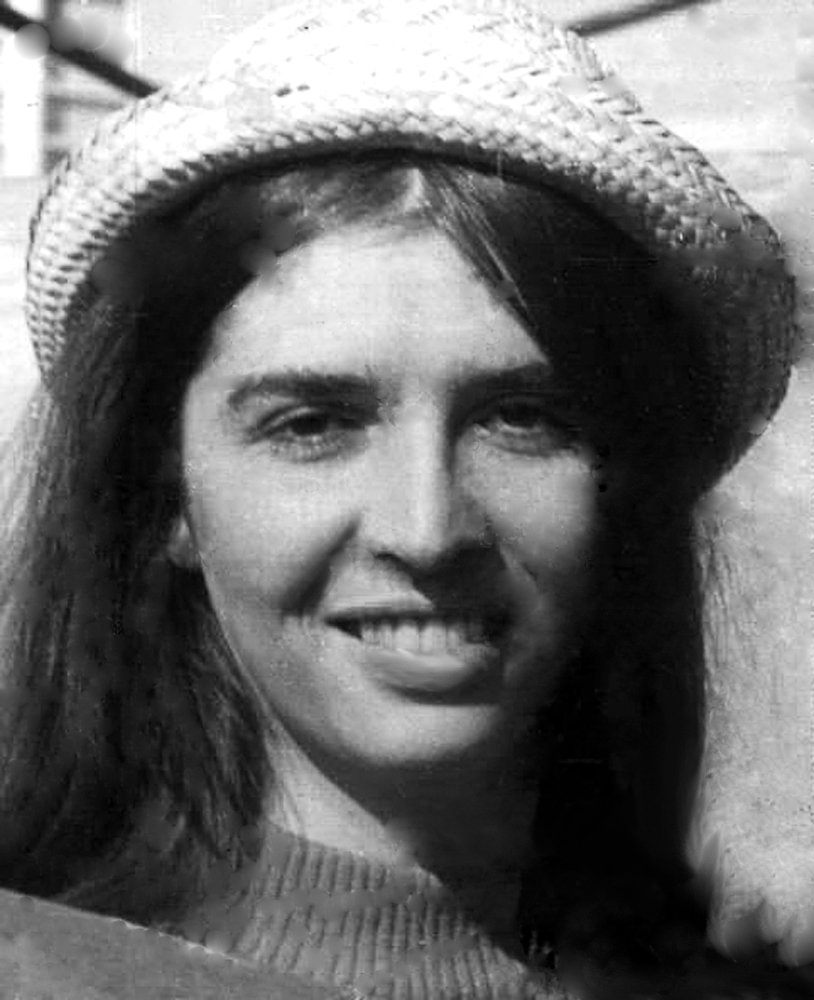
- Born: 6 January 1945; Laureles, Paraguay
- Died: 8 January 1973 (aged 28)
- Body discovered: São Bento, Abreu e Lima
- Occupation: Guerrilla fighter
- Known for: Death in the Massacre da Chácara São Bento
- Movement: Vanguarda Popular Revolucionária (VPR)
- Spouse: José Maria Ferreira de Araújo
- Partner: José Anselmo de Santos
- Relatives: Rafael Barrett (grandfather)

Soledad Barrett Viedma (6 January 1945 – 8 January 1973) was a Paraguay militant activist involved in the armed struggle against the Brazilian military dictatorship. A granddaughter of the Spanish writer and activist Rafael Barrett, Viedma spent her childhood in Uruguay, where she was kidnapped by a group of Neo-Nazis. Having undergone guerrilla training in Cuba, she joined the militant anti-fascist group Vanguarda Popular Revolucionária (VPR) in Brazil. In 1973, she was killed in the Chácara São Bento Massacre, committed by Brazilian military police forces.

== Early life ==
Soledad Barrett Viedma was born in January 1945 in Paraguay. Her father was Alejandro Barrett, the only son of the Spanish writer Rafael Barrett who had settled in Paraguay in the early 1910s. She spent most of her childhood in Montevideo, Uruguay, where her family lived in exile due to their left-wing activism. At the age of 17, she was kidnapped by a group of Uruguayan Neo-Nazis. The incident resulted in two swastikas being incised on her thighs because she had refused to repeat slogans praising the German dictator Adolf Hitler.

== Activism and death ==
In 1967, having been introduced to the milieu of militant activism, Viedma travelled to Cuba in order to undergo guerrilla training. It was there that she met her future husband, José Maria Ferreira de Araújo, a member of the Vanguarda Popular Revolucionaria (VPR), a militant anti-fascist group from Brazil. The couple had one daughter.

After her husband had disappeared, she relocated to his native Brazil and joined the resistance against the Brazilian military dictatorship. She was stationed at Recife and began a relationship with José Anselmo dos Santos, known as Cabo Anselmo, a militant who had been a leader of the 1964 Saliors' Revolt. On 8 January 1973, Barrett Viedma and five other members of the resistance movement were found dead in a barn at the São Bento Ranch, Abreu e Lima. According to the official version of events, they died during an armed confrontation with the police from which only Anselmo had managed to escape. It was later found, through the work of journalist Elio Gaspari, that the militants had been kidnapped in different locations, tortured and killed. The incident is known as the Chácara São Bento Massacre and has been described by Gaspari as "one of the dictatorship's most savage massacres".
