= Brazilian Automobile Confederation =

Entity responsible for the automobile sport in Brazil

- Sport: Auto Racing
- Jurisdiction: Brazil
- Abbreviation: CBA
- Founded: July 7, 1961
- Affiliation: CODASUR-FIA
- Headquarters: Rio de Janeiro, RJ, Brazil
- President: Giovanni Guerra
- Sponsor: BRB

Official website
- www.cba.org.br

The Brazilian Automobile Confederation (Portuguese: Confederação Brasileira de Automobilismo, CBA) is the highest authority responsible for the organization, planning, regulation, and creation of norms involved in the automobile sport in Brazil. It is a social, technical and sportive civil association affiliated to the International Automobile Federation, which represents the associated drivers, among other attributions, whose headquarters are located in the city of Rio de Janeiro.

== History ==
Since the invention of the automobile, there have been disputes between drivers and their machines to find out the best machine/human performance; in Brazil it was no different. The first auto race in Brazil took place in 1902, at the Mooca Hippodrome, in São Paulo. In Rio de Janeiro, the first auto race happened in 1905, with the start at Largo do Machado. In 1907, the Automóvel Clube do Brasil (ACB) was founded in Rio de Janeiro, becoming the first entity responsible for sports competitions with automobiles in Brazil. The first official competition took place in 1908, when the Itapecerica da Serra Circuit was created in the state of São Paulo.

After several decades, Brazil already had numerous automobile competitions, but there was dissatisfaction among the drivers about how the ACB positioned itself in regards to competitions and the way it was managed (too much glamour and not enough professionalism). The alignment of ideas between drivers and sports entrepreneurs about the professionalization of the category only happened in the early 1960s, which led to the creation of a confederation. To make this possible, a minimum number of state federations was necessary, resulting in the establishment of several institutions, such as Automobile Federation of Paraná, Automobile Federation of São Paulo, Automobile Federation of Rio Grande do Sul, Automobile Federation of Rio de Janeiro and Automobile Federation of Minas Gerais. On September 7, 1961, with the help of Automobile Club of Brasília and Automobile Club of Blumenau (founding entities of the CBA), the Brazilian Automobile Confederation was founded.

Within a few months, the CBA already had the support of more than a dozen state entities. To avoid conflicts of competitions and championships with the CBA, categories were first created for kart racing and rally. To professionalize Brazilian auto racing, the CBA created driving schools in the 1960s and invested in the formation of "official competition and timing agents". Edgard Bezerra Leite was the first president of the CBA.

As the years went by, the CBA took over all official competitions in Brazil.

The professionalism that the category needed and that culminated with the creation of the CBA allowed Brazil to be included in the Formula One circuit in 1973, more than 10 years after its creation. The entity also supported the beginning of the careers of hundreds of drivers who stood out internationally.

== Competitions ==
Currently, the CBA organizes or supervises dozens of competitions, such as: Stock Car Brazil, Stock Light, F-Renault, Clio, F-Truck, Pick Up Racing, Brazilian Endurance, Brazilian Rally of Speed, Regularity and Cross-Country, Rally 4x4, Tubular Land Speed, Brazilian Kart, South American Kart, Brazilian Kart Cup, Mitsubishi Rally of Speed, of Regularity, Peugeot Cup, University Rally, Brazilian Brands and Pilots, F-Brasil 1600, Maserati Trophy, Brazilian Tourism Championship, among others.

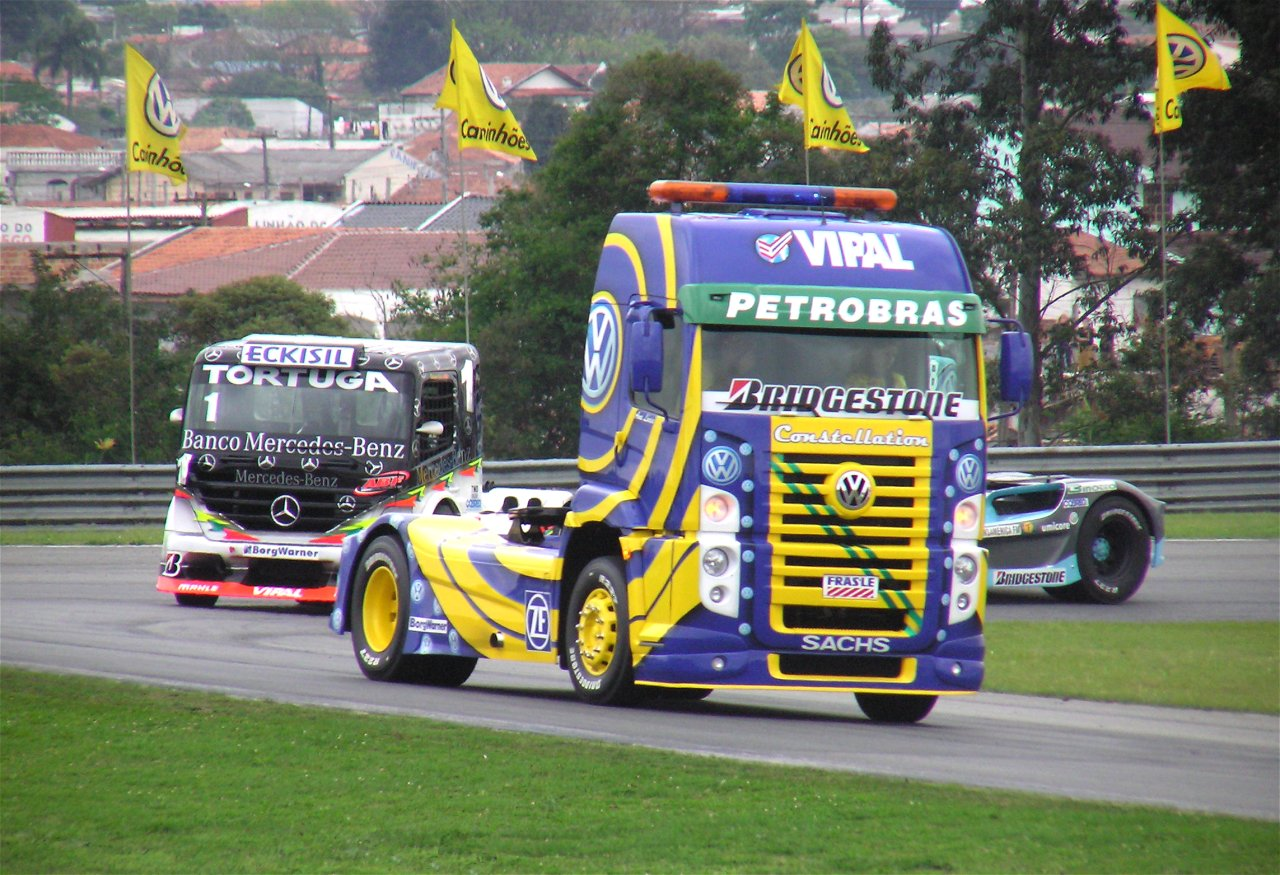
F-Truck

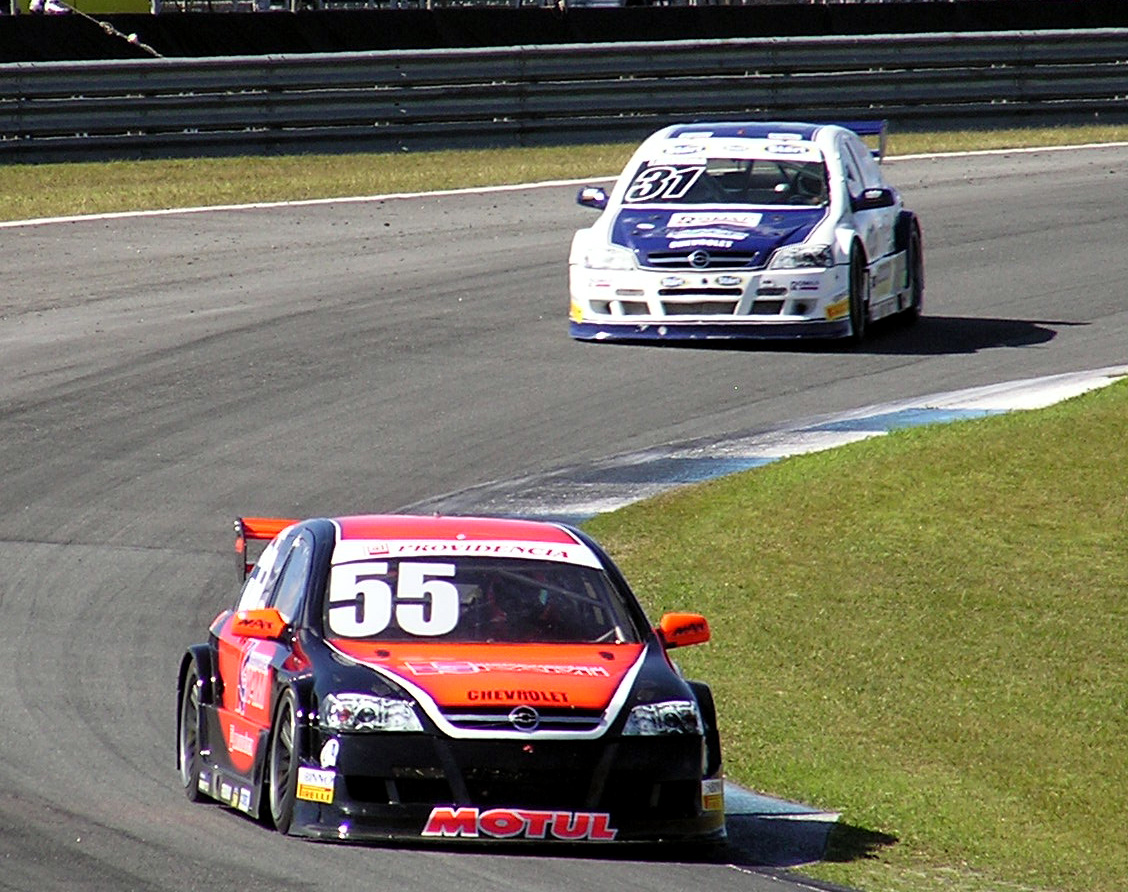
Stock Car Pro Series

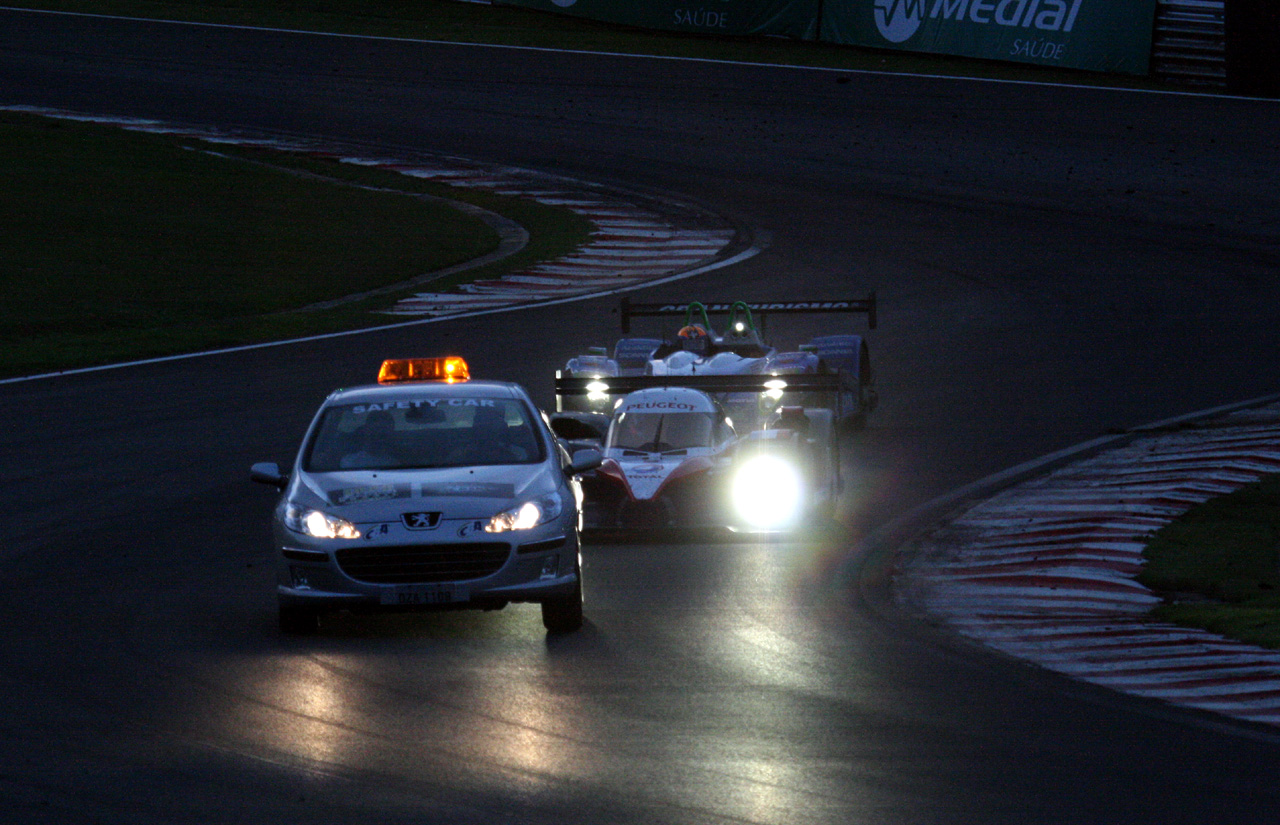
1000 Miles of Brazil

== See also ==
- International Automobile Federation
- Formula One
