= 1964 Sailors' Revolt =

Conflict between the Brazilian Navy and the Association of Sailors

- Part of the Fourth Brazilian Republic
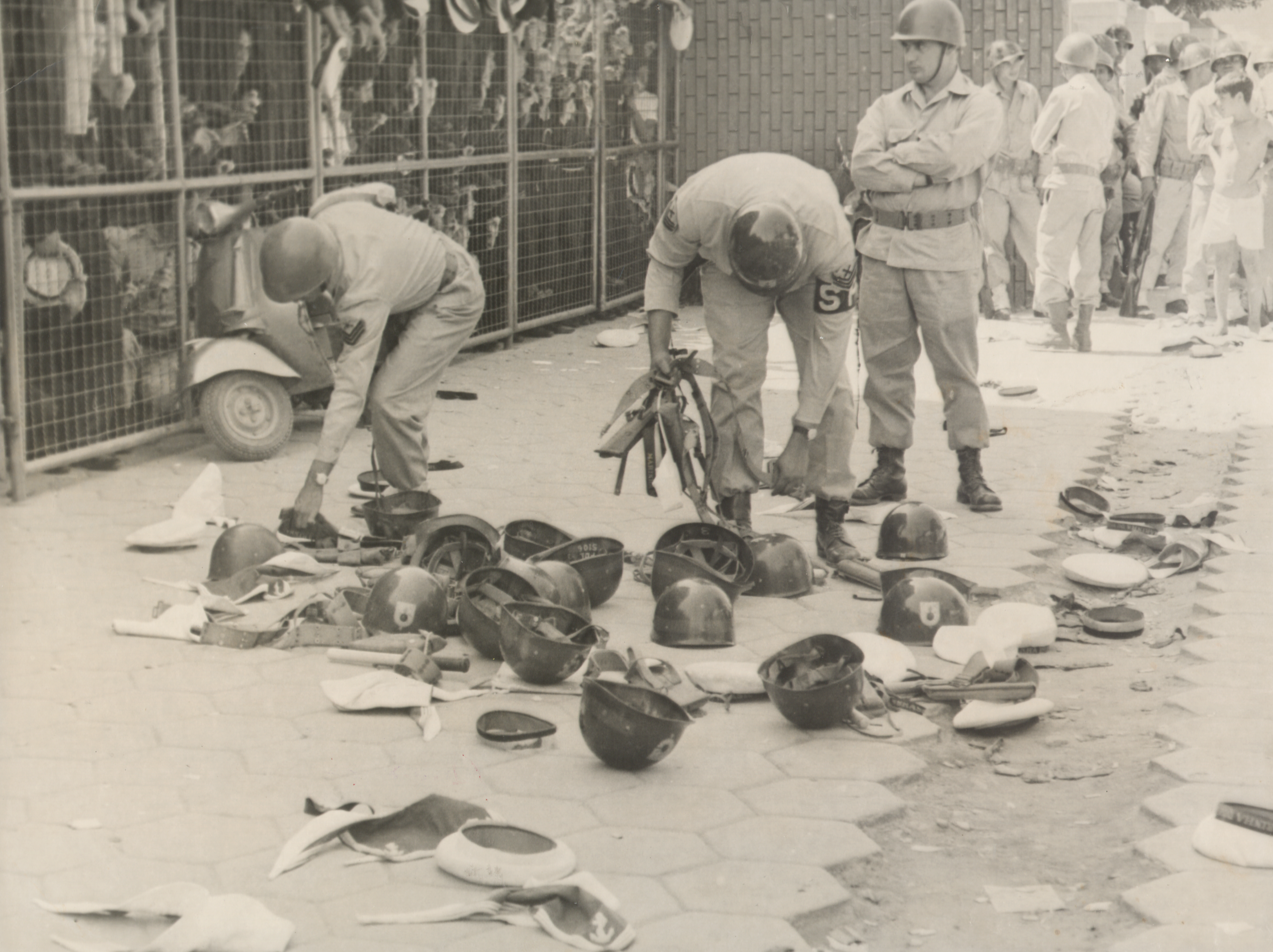
- Marines join the rebelled sailors
Date	25–27 March 1964
Location	Guanabara, Brazil
Result	End of mutiny; Amnesty for participants; Change in the Minister of the Navy

Belligerents
Brazilian Navy; Brazilian Army	AMFNB

Commanders and leaders
Silvio Mota; Luiz Phelippe Sinay	José Anselmo dos Santos

Units involved
Marine Corps Police Company; Riachuelo Battalion; 1st Army Police Battalion; Mechanized Reconnaissance Regiment	Rebelled sailors

Casualties and losses
	0–1 dead and 3–4 injured in the Navy Arsenal

The Sailors' Revolt was a conflict between Brazilian Navy authorities and the Association of Sailors and Marines of Brazil (AMFNB) from 25 to 27 March 1964, in Rio de Janeiro. AMFNB members, a welfare and trade union organization, were not armed and revolted to demand changes in the navy, counting on the mutual support of left-wing movements. The navy besieged them at the Metalworkers' Union, and the crisis spread to the Navy Arsenal and ships. Its outcome, negotiated by president João Goulart's government, outraged the perpetrators of the 1964 Brazilian coup d'état, just a few days later, and was thus one of its immediate antecedents.

The AMFNB was part of the soldiers' movements in Brazil's Armed Forces (low military ranks) in the early 1960s, also responsible for the 1963 sergeants' revolt, in which many of its members participated. It was a class association for a poor sector, with hard working conditions, deprived of rights such as voting and marriage, and marked by social inequality in relation to the officers. Founded in 1962, its president in 1964 was the sailor José Anselmo dos Santos, known as "Corporal Anselmo". (Note: "who was actually not a corporal, he was a sailor first class, but his motto had been confused by journalists" (Mendes Júnior 2008, p. 2).) In those two years it acquired thousands of members and a more combative leadership, coming closer to president Goulart and leftist organizations, as well as becoming interested in issues outside the navy, such as the base reforms. Officers were afraid of their possible indiscipline, and their politicization was not tolerated, unlike the political activities of the officialdom.

The association's second anniversary, on the 25th, was celebrated at the Metalworkers Union. Upon receiving news of the arrest of its directors for statements made on the 20th, those present at the celebration decided to remain in an assembly until a series of demands was fullfiled. The Minister of the Navy, Silvio Mota, decreed strict readiness, which required the sailors' presence in their units, but they disobeyed. This disobedience did not constitute an armed movement. On the 26th, the minister decided to invade the union with marines reinforced by the army. The Marine Corps commander, admiral Cândido Aragão, was dismissed from office due to his refusal to attack. Subsequently, the first attempt failed as some marines joined the rebels, while the second attempt was cancelled to allow the president to negotiate. There were clashes and sabotage on ships, and sailors were shot at in the Navy Arsenal. The left was generally in favor of the rebels, while the officialdom was against them. Goulart ended the confrontation by giving amnesty to the sailors and appointing Paulo Mário da Cunha Rodrigues to the Ministry of the Navy. Together with his attendance on the 30th at the meeting at the Automóvel Club, his decision was harshly criticized by the opposition and seen by officers as connivance with the breakdown of military discipline, thus strengthening the support base for the military coup that overthrew him at the end of the month.

The revolt is related to the 1910 Revolt of the Lash, as was already felt at the time. After the coup, those involved were expelled or retired from the navy and prosecuted in the Military Court. A politicized nucleus, led by former directors, joined the guerrilla organizations against the military dictatorship, but without losing the cohesion of the AMFNB times. "Corporal Anselmo" collaborated with repression bodies during the period, raising the accusation that the revolt in 1964 was the work of agent provocateurs working for the coup plotters; this is disputed by more recent historians. After the Amnesty Law of 1979, former sailors and marines fought for years in court and in Congress to obtain compensation and reinstatement to the paid reserve with promotions, organizing themselves into the National Mobilization Unit for Amnesty (UMNA). Demands from the AMFNB, such as the right to vote and marriage, ended up being met later, and the status of low-ranking officers changed.

== Background ==
=== Recruitment in the navy ===
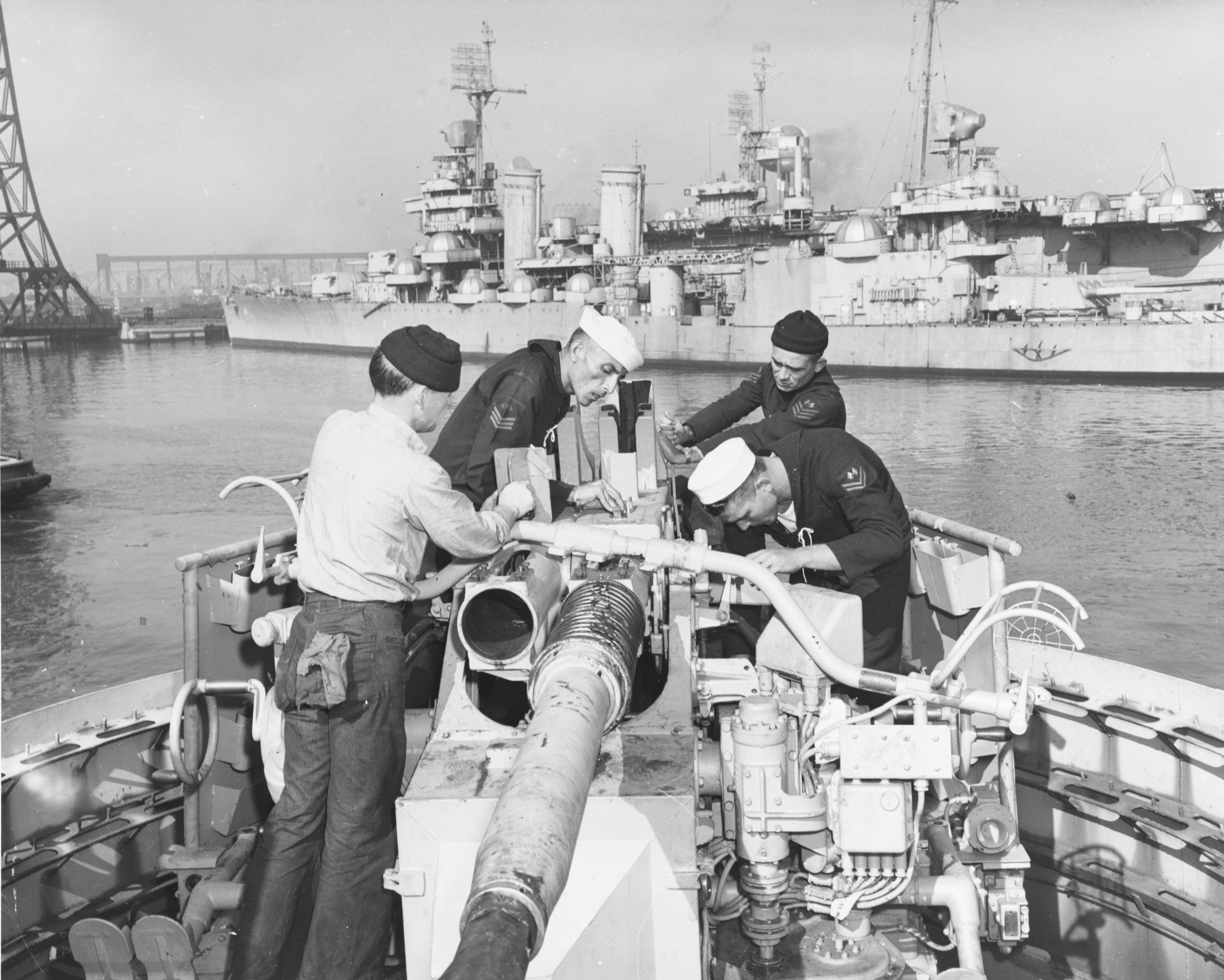
Crew from Barroso, 1951

The 1964 rebels joined the Brazilian Navy in the late 1950s and early 1960s. At that time, the lower ranks (Note: The enlisted ranks were non-commissioned officer, 1st, 2nd and 3rd sergeant and, further down, different names depending on the service. The navy had corporals, 1st and 2nd class sailors, cabin boys and apprentice sailors. The General Service of Cooking had steward's assistants, 1st and 2nd class cabin boys and recruit sailors. The Marine Corps had corporals, 1st and 2nd class privates, and private soldier. See the annexes from Almeida 2010 for the hierarchical pyramid and career plan.) were organized into the Navy Lower Personnel Corps (CPSA), responsible for manning the ships, and in the Marine Lower Personnel Corps (CPSCFN). The CPSA, more numerous, recruited young men through volunteering, conscription and mainly through the Seaman Apprentice Schools, located in Pernambuco, Ceará, Bahia and Santa Catarina. Thus, the majority of sailors came from poor families, with relatives in the countryside, from Northern and Northeastern Brazil, (Note: For example, the first board of directors of the AMFNB had a president from Rio Grande do Norte and a man from Alagoas as vice-president (Almeida 2010, pp. 33–34). The second board had in these positions a person from Sergipe and a person from Paraíba (Almeida 2010, pp. 42–43).) seeking social advancement in the navy. Recruitment was publicized in the countryside. Sailor Antônio Duarte recalled the pamphlets with the following message, which he considered misleading: "in the navy you will have the opportunity to see the world. Through promotions, reach the officialdom".

At the Seaman Apprentice Schools, education was both military and technical, and the pressure was great. The sailors of the 1960s were "specialized workers", involved in calculations, maneuvers and complex machines, and therefore, belonging to a diverse body, divided into many specializations. Just like in 1910, at the time of the Revolt of the Lash, the navy was undergoing re-equipment. Although the new equipment was second-hand, it already represented a technological advance, and therefore, required greater qualification of sailors.

=== The sailors' condition ===
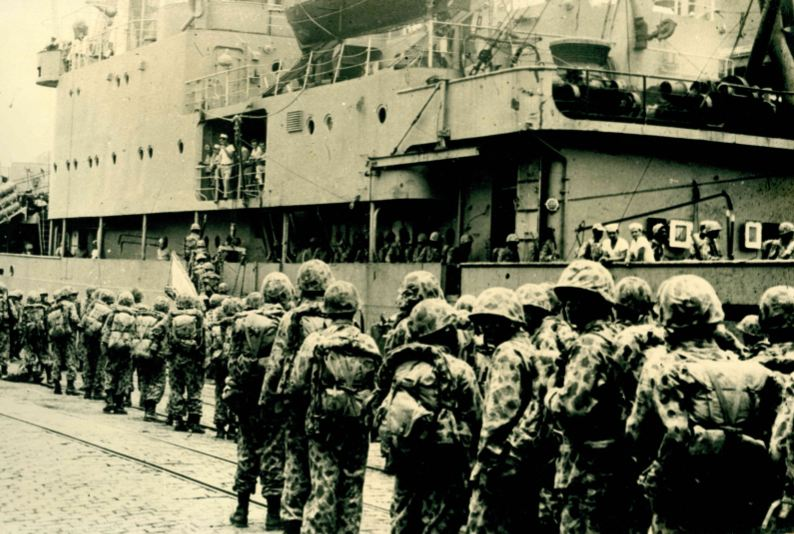
Boarding of marines on exercises in 1964

Most of the ships, and therefore the enlisted men, were in Rio de Janeiro. The reality in this city, where they lived without support from their families, was different from what they had expected. The working conditions, housing, and food were harsh. The sailors lived in rented rooms, in groups, in poor neighborhoods (especially near the port area) or inside military units, especially on the ships, where the "chronics" or "barnacles" resided, as the on-board work required absolute availability. During vacations, since their earnings were very small to visit their families, they sought temporary jobs. On the other hand, there was a romantic fascination with this adventurous life; for example, Avelino Capitani recalled the pride with which he was received when he returned to his hometown in Rio Grande do Sul's countryside, dressed in his sailor uniform.

Leisure options were scarce. Many got involved with drugs, prostitutes (the "low prostitution"), and petty crimes. The stereotype of the sailor was that of an "individual detached from society with dubious morality, a frequenter of brothels, violent, a drug addict, and an alcoholic". This negative image was old, and the prejudice was accentuated by the large number of black and mixed-race sailors. In November 1964, the Minister of the Navy mentioned, in a document to the President of Brazil, the "concentration, here in Rio – the main support base of our naval forces – of single sailors and marines, away from their families, without the convenient social and family environment, and thus exposed to the known deviations of frequenting places that are not conducive to the development of young people's formation".

The reference to singles is linked to a restriction: sailors, soldiers, and corporals could only marry after years of service and with the officers' permission. The restrictions went beyond work. In public, the enlisted men were required to wear their uniform, even off-duty, exposing them to social stigma. They had no right to vote or run for office. Violating the Navy's Disciplinary Regulations was not punished with physical punishment, as in 1910, but the demands remained strict. Career continuity depended on the subjective evaluation of the officers, who could even require details of their subordinates' personal presentation. Thirty points lost in the record book (Note: "Administrative document common to all navy personnel (officers and soldiers) where the military's career was monitored, recording all occurrences relating to the individual, not just punishments" (Castro 2022, p. 234).) resulted in exclusion from active service. Accounts from sailors emphasized how punishments could be arbitrary; an officer's favor or interests could be decisive.

For officers, the rigor was less. The social gap between them and the enlisted men was wide. Officers historically had an elitist recruitment and aristocratic profile, and maintained their privileges in food, accommodation, and other aspects of daily life. Even non-commissioned officers and sergeants were above of corporals and sailors, enjoying a much higher pay. A system of courses allowed for advancement in the hierarchy, but studying was difficult, especially for those on board. Promotion to 3rd sergeant depended on a professional and military knowledge exam, with a high failure rate. Only two attempts were allowed for corporals.

When promoted to sergeant, the black shoes and belts of the lower ranks' main uniforms were replaced by new white ones. The Sailors' Revolt would occur within the "black shoes" segment. For one of them, Avelino Capitani, the conflict with the naval authorities originated in the perpetuation of the "old and archaic social command structure," while another, Antônio Duarte, did not believe in the navy's discourse, which exalted the institution's revolutionary transformation over time. Frustration, discontent, unity, and the habit of resisting the adversities of naval activity led this segment to organize.

== AMFNB and the navy ==
=== The "fuzinauta" association ===
This period, the first half of the 1960s, was a time of great mobilization in Brazil, with groups such as students, trade unionists, artists, organized peasants, communists, and the Catholic youth. As part of this social unrest and linked to other forces, movements emerged from the lower ranks of the Armed Forces, such as sergeants, corporals, and soldiers. Typically left-wing, with nationalist and reformist ideologies, they organized themselves into class associations, including the Association of Sailors and Marines of Brazil (AMFNB), founded on 25 March 1962 by sailors and marines, up to the rank of corporal. This group is also referred to as the "fuzinauta" association or movement, emphasizing the common cause of sailors and marines. Several of its founders were more educated and politically informed individuals who followed the example of the sergeants’ and stewards’ associations, already recognized by the navy.

The "fuzinauta" movement was initially disconnected from left-wing movements, and its focus was "more on demands than politics". Of the seven objectives listed in its statute, five were social welfare-related. It provided "medical and legal assistance, the development of educational incentive projects with partnerships that enabled access to classrooms, basic etiquette courses, English language courses, recreational activities (dances, football, and city tours), and help for those wishing to abandon vices such as gambling and alcoholism", in addition to housing for those who missed transport. Only two of the goals were specific to members; the rest were aimed at the lower ranks as a whole.

This social welfare activity filled the gap left by the navy's almost nonexistent social assistance. A milestone in the development of the AMFNB was the involvement of social worker Erica Bayer in Roth, starting in October 1962. As director of the Social Service Directorate, she turned to public services and volunteers and organized a legal department and sections on Health, Family, and Education. With the permission of the secretary of social services of the State of Guanabara, Sandra Cavalcanti, the members renovated a state school, where they began receiving night classes from university students. Roth herself taught philosophy. She earned the nickname "godmother of Brazil’s sailors".

This experience of military associativism also had a trade union character; Brazilianist Thomas Skidmore described it as "a union that would demand improved working conditions from its commanders". The AMFNB published the newspaper A Tribuna do Mar and maintained representatives in the military organizations, the "delegates", responsible for spreading the institution’s message and collecting membership fees and contributions. The navy’s routine of constant travel accelerated the recruitment of new members and the structuring of the organization nationwide. The members’ fees funded the headquarters on São José Street, in downtown Rio de Janeiro.

=== The dispute for the board ===
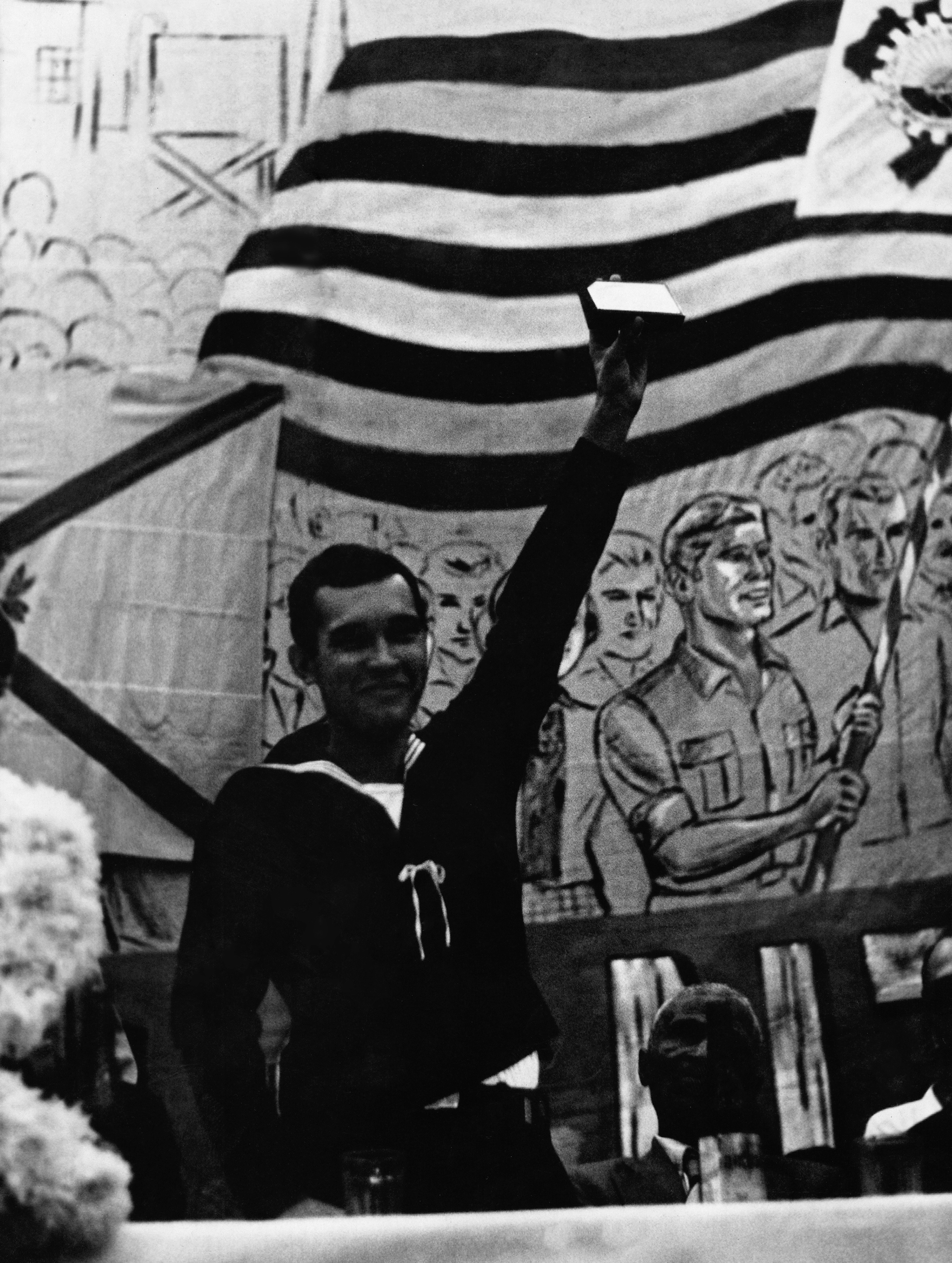
Sailor José Anselmo dos Santos, known as "Cabo (Corporal) Anselmo"

The first president of the AMFNB was the artillery corporal João Barbosa de Almeida. Well-connected with the admirals, he had a conciliatory attitude towards the officers, trying to avoid confrontation and radicalization. From the beginning, he communicated the existence of the association to the authorities. His goal was recognition by the Ministry of the Navy, without which the collection of membership fees could not be made directly through the payroll, making it a cumbersome process. However, no recognition was granted. This privilege was granted to less politicized class associations, but not to potential sources of problems like the AMFNB, which was viewed with suspicion from the outset by the officers and investigated by the navy’s Intelligence Center (CENIMAR).

The conciliatory policy of this first board was criticized by another faction, consisting of sailors on board, whose career progression and social development were more difficult. They wanted a more militarized organization, in the form of committees, with political and militant activity. However, they lacked "an emblematic person, a symbol, to confront the situation", in the words of sailor Antônio Duarte dos Santos. This role was filled by sailor José Anselmo dos Santos, politicized by Antônio Duarte. Anselmo had some education, was charismatic, and known for his gift of oratory. At the time, he served at the Admiral Wandenkolk Instruction Center (CIAW), where numerous enlisted men attended specialization courses, making it a focal point for the AMFNB within the navy.

In April 1963, Anselmo was elected president of the AMFNB with 236 votes. The new board also included Marcos Antônio da Silva Lima as vice president and Antônio Duarte dos Santos as president of the Deliberative Council. According to the corporal and "sailor-journalist" (Note: See Rodrigues 2017, p. 14 and 102.) Pedro Viegas, Anselmo was not the strongest candidate for the presidency of the AMFNB and was only elected after three other preferred candidates withdrew. Anselmo is recognized among the left and the military as a more combative leader, but sources from the sailors reveal that the most militant was not Anselmo, but the vice president Marcos Antônio da Silva Lima. Marcos Antônio had a leadership position among the sailors and maintained contact with other civil and military entities. According to Antônio Duarte dos Santos, the president was not even the most historically relevant figure in the group; "Anselmo consulted Marcos Antônio on practically all matters". Raimundo Porfírio da Costa, a delegate of the AMFNB, pointed out that the actions attributed to Anselmo were collective decisions of the movement.

Under the new board, relations with the Naval Administration worsened. The officers in general did not accept the recognition of the association and did not allow its members to participate in the entity’s activities. The exceptions were some officers aligned with the federal government of president João Goulart, such as Cândido Aragão, commander of the Marine Corps, who was himself a soldier who rose to the admiralty. Aragão "provided vehicles for outings for apprentices newly arrived from the naval schools and allowed the association’s representatives to work freely in recruiting new members, in addition to serving as an intermediary between the Minister of the Navy and the AMFNB".

=== Conflicts with authorities ===
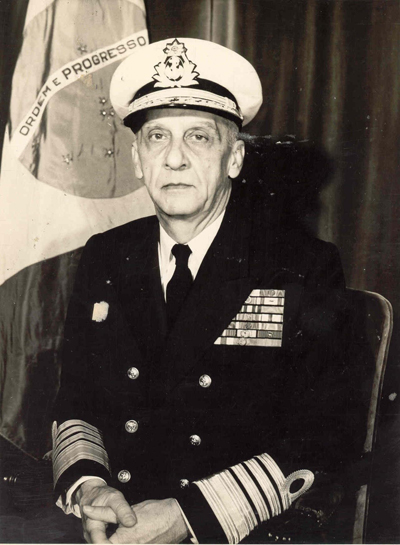
Sílvio Mota, minister of the navy from 1963 to 1964

In May 1963, the radicalizing speech of army sub-lieutenant Gelcy Rodrigues Correia — "we will take up our work instruments (rifles) and carry out the reforms together with the people" — resonated among the "fuzinautas". The idea of being "soldiers of the people", transcending the limits of the barracks, sounded convincing. The AMFNB aligned itself with the sergeants' movement, whose main concern at the time was the legal restraints to the candidacies they had launched in the 1962 general elections. According to Antônio Duarte, the election "boosted the soldiers' self-esteem and political confidence, confirming and strengthening the reformist view that transforming the conservative structure of the Armed Forces was possible".

On 12 September 1963, sergeants from the Air Force and Navy launched military operations in Brasília in reaction to a Supreme Federal Court decision reiterating the ineligibility of sergeants. The AMFNB was not responsible for the revolt, but 72 of its members (out of 270 navy enlisted personnel involved) participated, and its leadership supported the rebels. With the sergeants’ defeat in Brasília, the movements of enlisted personnel were criticized in the press and persecuted by military authorities.

The officers’ concern was the breakdown of military hierarchy and discipline. However, researchers of the revolt have already highlighted breaches of hierarchy committed among officers opposing the government, with some even participating in conspiracies to overthrow the president. It is argued, therefore, that the subordinates followed the example set by their superiors’ political actions, and further, that these actions were only treated as indiscipline and a breach of hierarchy when coming from enlisted personnel. Indiscipline was indeed used by the AMFNB as a bargaining tool. As sailor Raul Duarte wrote in Tribuna do Mar in February 1964, granting their demands was necessary "to safeguard discipline and military hierarchy". In the same newspaper, Antônio Duarte dos Santos proposed "modifying this old perspective of the 'disciplined soldier' detached from the problems of his country".

Amid increasing political polarization, and fearing a new revolt among enlisted personnel, on 16 September, navy minister Sílvio Borges de Sousa Mota ordered the Navy General Staff to pressure the AMFNB to amend its statute, making it purely apolitical. The official letter warned about the "unionist language, full of demands for the 'class', many of them with a double meaning" published in Tribuna do Mar. The navy's top management would accept the AMFNB if its demands were met, just as it accepted the association of sub-officers and sergeants. Still, its activities would be monitored, as "its social body will always be temporary and composed of young men" and "will run the risk of falling into the hands of opportunists", "as has been happening in other sectors of Brazilian society". In the navy administration's legal understanding, the statute violated legislation on military political speech, which could only occur through the commanders.

The AMFNB's leadership confronted the naval administration. In assemblies and demonstrations, the "fuzinautas" made demands such as "a revision of the Navy's Disciplinary Regulation, as well as better wages and working conditions, recognition of their association by the naval force, career stability, the right to vote and marry, and the permission to wear civilian clothes during off-duty hours". According to justice minister Abelardo Jurema, Sílvio Mota showed him studies proving the feasibility of these demands, and their implementation had already been decided. However, this was not carried out.

=== National projection ===
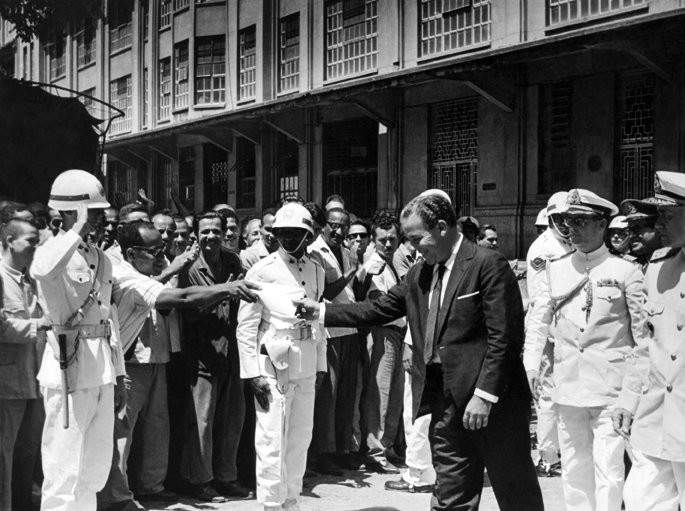
João Goulart in the Navy Arsenal in 1964

The naval administration attempted to dismantle the AMFNB by persecuting its delegates and directors. To prevent a revolt, the directors were dispersed among vessels and subjected to summonses by CENIMAR. As the "fuzinautas" saw no solution coming from the naval authorities, they sought support from the federal government and social movements. By 1964, they had entered a phase of radicalization. In January, president Goulart appointed admiral Aragão and general Assis Brasil to mediate the conflict between the "fuzinautas" and the admirals. This effort was ineffective, but the AMFNB expanded its political and union connections.

This rapprochement was mutual, as the association gained relevance and attracted interest from both enemies and allies. The number of members had reached around fifteen thousand, with one-third contributing financially, according to Anselmo; this was within a navy force of about 40,000 personnel. (Note: Mentioned in the speech by admiral Augusto Rademaker, reproduced in the Revista Marítima Brasileira.) There were branches in Ladário, Natal, Recife, and Salvador, with another being formed in Vitória. Admiral Eddy Sampaio Espellet of CENIMAR recalled how "to attract the sailors, the association secured incredible advantages: non-repayable funds from the Ministry of Education (...); doctors offering free consultations and, most importantly, it achieved recognition as a public interest entity from the Ministry of Justice, which is extremely difficult to obtain".

On 1 February, the AMFNB made front-page news. At an assembly in the Bus Drivers’ Union, attended by representatives from 17 unions and military associations, the "fuzinauta" movement demanded the annulment of a Military Police Inquiry opened against its leaders in October. According to Anselmo, admiral Aragão broke ties with them in disagreement over the event. Tribuna do Mar reached a circulation of fifteen thousand copies, the leaders secured a program on Mayrink Veiga Radio, and on several occasions, they met with Darcy Ribeiro, the Chief of Staff to the Presidency of the Republic.

President Goulart, Leonel Brizola, the General Workers' Command (CGT), and the Brazilian Communist Party (PCB) sought to leverage support from the AMFNB. One of its demands, the right to vote for enlisted personnel, was already part of the left's agenda and advocated by the CGT, the leading union body of the time. The enlisted personnel's relationship with Brizola was also close. Thanks to admiral Aragão, Brizola appeared on television flanked by two marines as guards. For their part, the "fuzinautas" supported Goulart’s proposed reforms, admired Brizola, and had ties with organizations such as the PCB and Política Operária (POLOP).

These relationships further distanced the AMFNB from the Admiralty Council. The association with the PCB, in particular, led officers to accuse the entity of being a communist front, though the connection was not that deep, despite the presence of some party members within the association. Erica Roth, though a communist, was not a party member and provided bibliographic recommendations to the "fuzinautas" during their politization process. There is more evidence of Brizolist sailors and marines than communist ones, as the PCB focused its military proselytism on officers. The dissident faction that would form the PCdoB had some influence, and Antônio Duarte dos Santos, though critical of the party, attended some of its meetings.

The navy minister was pressured on one side by the government to preserve the association and on the other by the Admiralty Council to shut it down. However, shutting down an association with thousands of sailors would not be simple; the political fallout would be dramatic, and it was a legal entity. The minister feared that ordering its closure would be challenged in court and overturned by a writ of mandamus. For their part, the sailors showed willingness to make some concessions and removed the term "class" from their statute, as the naval administration had objected to it.

On 20 March, the AMFNB planned to honor marshal Osvino Ferreira Alves, the president of Petrobras, at the Duque de Caxias Refinery. However, minister Mota intervened with Osvino to prevent the event. The sailors and marines then gathered at the Bank Workers’ Union, where they harshly criticized the navy minister and demanded his dismissal. They proposed replacing him with former minister Pedro Paulo de Araújo Suzano. Mota responded with successive arrests of association leaders. Three of them — Antônio Duarte dos Santos, José Anselmo dos Santos, and Marcos Antônio da Silva Lima — went into hiding to attend the association’s anniversary. As the crisis unfolded, president Goulart traveled to his hometown of São Borja, in Rio Grande do Sul, to spend the Easter holiday.

== Revolt ==
=== The association's anniversary ===
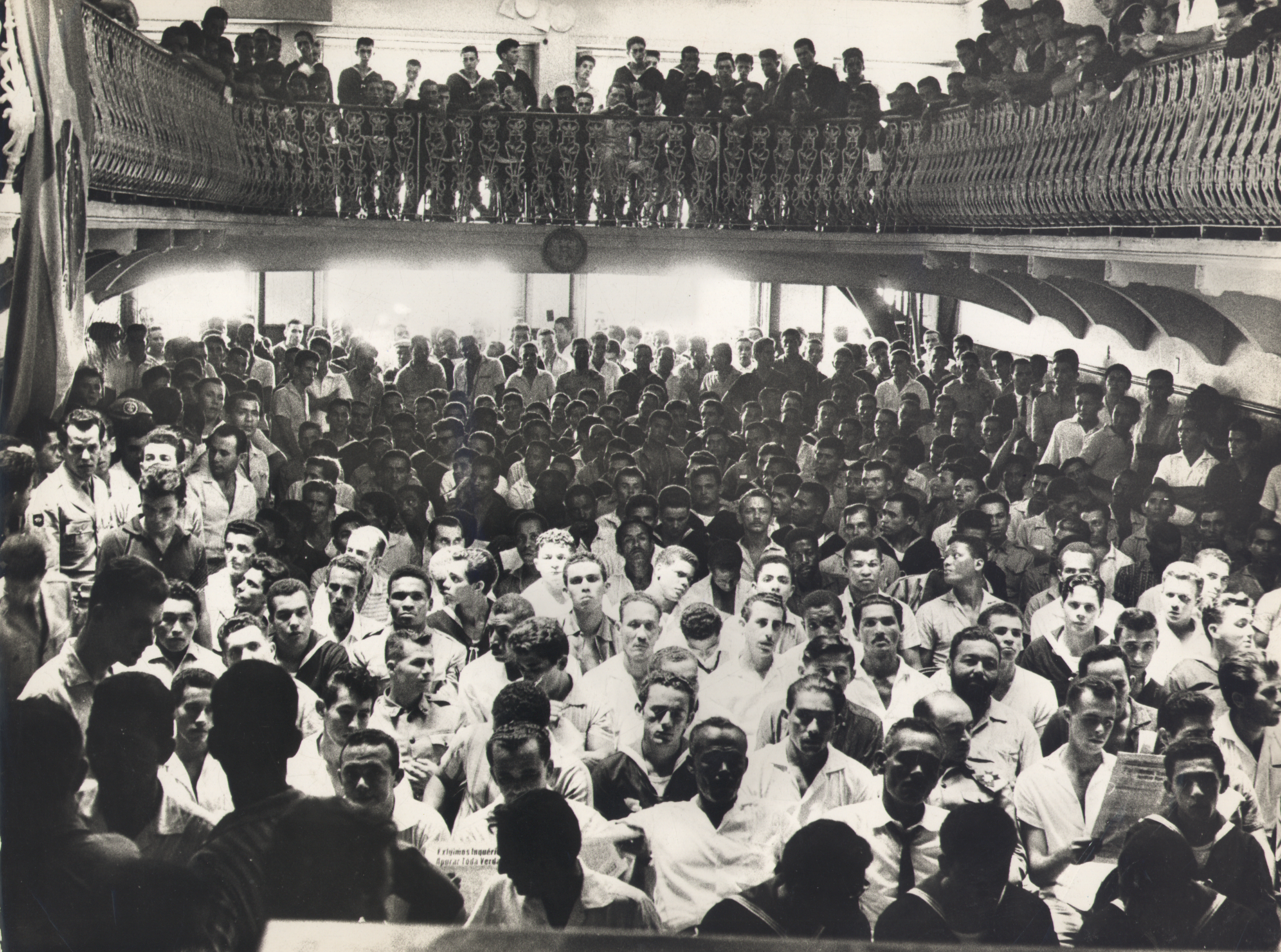
Inside the Union

The celebration of the association's second anniversary on 25 March had been announced since January. It was scheduled to take place at the Metalworkers’ Union, the "Steel Palace", at 19:00. The president of Brazil was invited but did not attend, following advice from the Navy Minister. Most historians note that the navy prohibited the event, but minister Mota never claimed to have issued such a prohibition in his 1964 testimony. Instead, he contested the meeting on other legal grounds, such as the prohibition of public demonstrations regarding internal and political matters. The arrest warrants were issued for the events of 20 March. The anniversary itself was legal: the AMFNB was a registered civil entity, the sailors were off duty, and the celebration did not take place in a military facility.

Absent from the event were the president, minister Jurema, and admiral Aragão. A notable attendee was João Cândido, leader of the 1910 Revolt of the Lash, who was receiving a pension from the association. At 84 years old, he was photographed by Ultima Hora with the caption "1910 Revolt present in '64", emphasizing the connection between the two generations of sailors. However, the "Sea Dragon", as he was known, disagreed with the younger sailors’ involvement in issues beyond naval matters. "A sailors' revolt only works at sea", he said. "A sailor should seize a ship, because that’s where he knows how to act, not go to a union, exposing himself to enemy action, which could have even bombed everything". The link between 1910 and 1964 went beyond this symbolic presence and lay in the ongoing dispute within the navy’s hierarchy and the role of sailors in society.

The event was attended by over 1,000 or 1,600 sailors. (Note: The first figure is provided by Rodrigues 2017, p. 30, and the second by Moraes 2011, p. 105.) In addition to sailors and marines, members of other military forces, such as the Guanabara Military Police and the Brazilian Air Force, were present, along with civilians, including members of the Chamber of Deputies, union leaders, and journalists. Paulo Schilling noted how "the unity of the left had been restored": prominent figures from various sectors attended and gave speeches, including members of the Communist Party, the General Workers’ Command (CGT), Popular Action, and the Women’s League. Congressman Max da Costa Santos represented the Leonel Brizola's followers. Paulo de Mello Bastos, Osvaldo Pacheco, Dante Pelacani, and Hércules Corrêa represented the CGT; the latter was also a congressman and a communist. Osvaldo Pacheco delivered a speech, claiming they could bring Brazil to a standstill.

=== Anselmo's speech ===
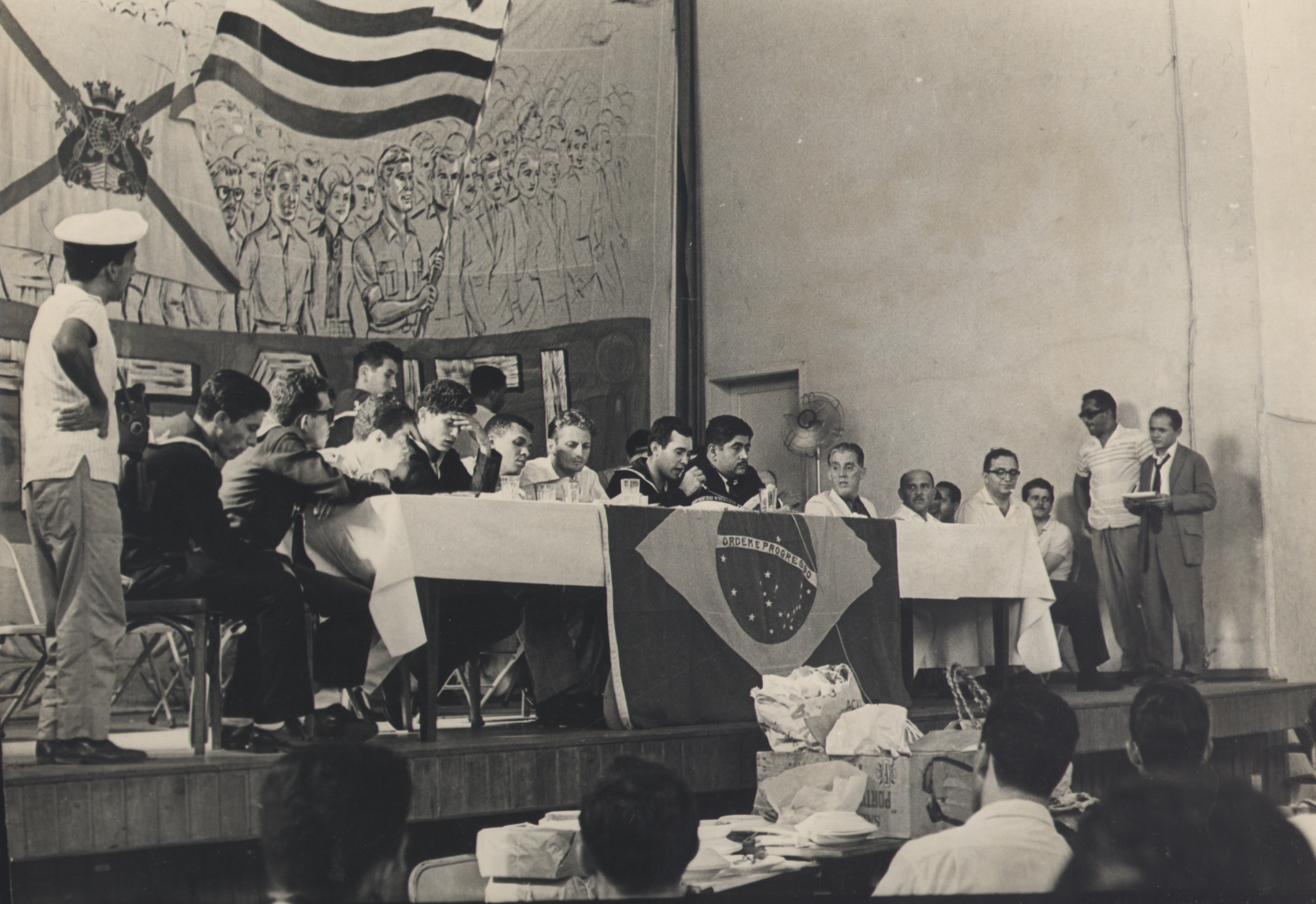
Anselmo at the microphone. To his right, Hércules Corrêa, from the CGT

The sailors approved the creation of a General Union of Military Workers, unifying the enlisted personnel associations, and decided to send the following proposals to the minister: "an end to punishments and the release of all prisoners, recognition of the association, humanization of the navy, improved food quality on ships and in barracks, and the identification and punishment of torturers".

"Cabo Anselmo", recognized for his oratory skills, delivered a highly political speech, touching on topics such as "landowners", "imperialism", "base reforms", and "the exploited". His rhetoric was fully aligned with the left-wing ideologies of the time, and his agenda aligned with those of the CGT, the National Union of Students, Unity and Action Pact, and the Nationalist Parliamentary Front. His ideas were not new and demonstrated a connection to Brizolist thought. The communist Carlos Marighella contributed to drafting the speech, as both Anselmo and Antônio Duarte later recounted. The speech was addressed to the president of Brazil, supporting his reforms and seeking his backing by emphasizing that the sailors belonged to the "popular classes".

Anselmo portrayed the AMFNB as a response to discrimination and defended it against the label of a "subversive entity". Countering this accusation, he argued that those "trying to subvert order are the allies of hidden forces, which drove one president to suicide, another to resign, tried to prevent Jango's inauguration, and now block the implementation of the Base Reforms". He then linked the current situation to the Revolt of the Lash. In the military sphere, he claimed to have support from enlisted personnel in the army, air force, Military Police, and Military Firefighters Corps. He clashed with the officer corps by denouncing the expulsion of the association's director and the ban on listening to the rally aboard ships. Addressing Congress, he demanded acceptance of land reform without prior monetary compensation and full voting rights for military personnel. Regarding the navy, he called for the reform of the Disciplinary Regulations, recognition of the AMFNB, amnesty for the Brasília rebels, the annulment of disciplinary violations, and job security for corporals, sailors, and marines.

=== The permanence in the Metalworkers Union ===
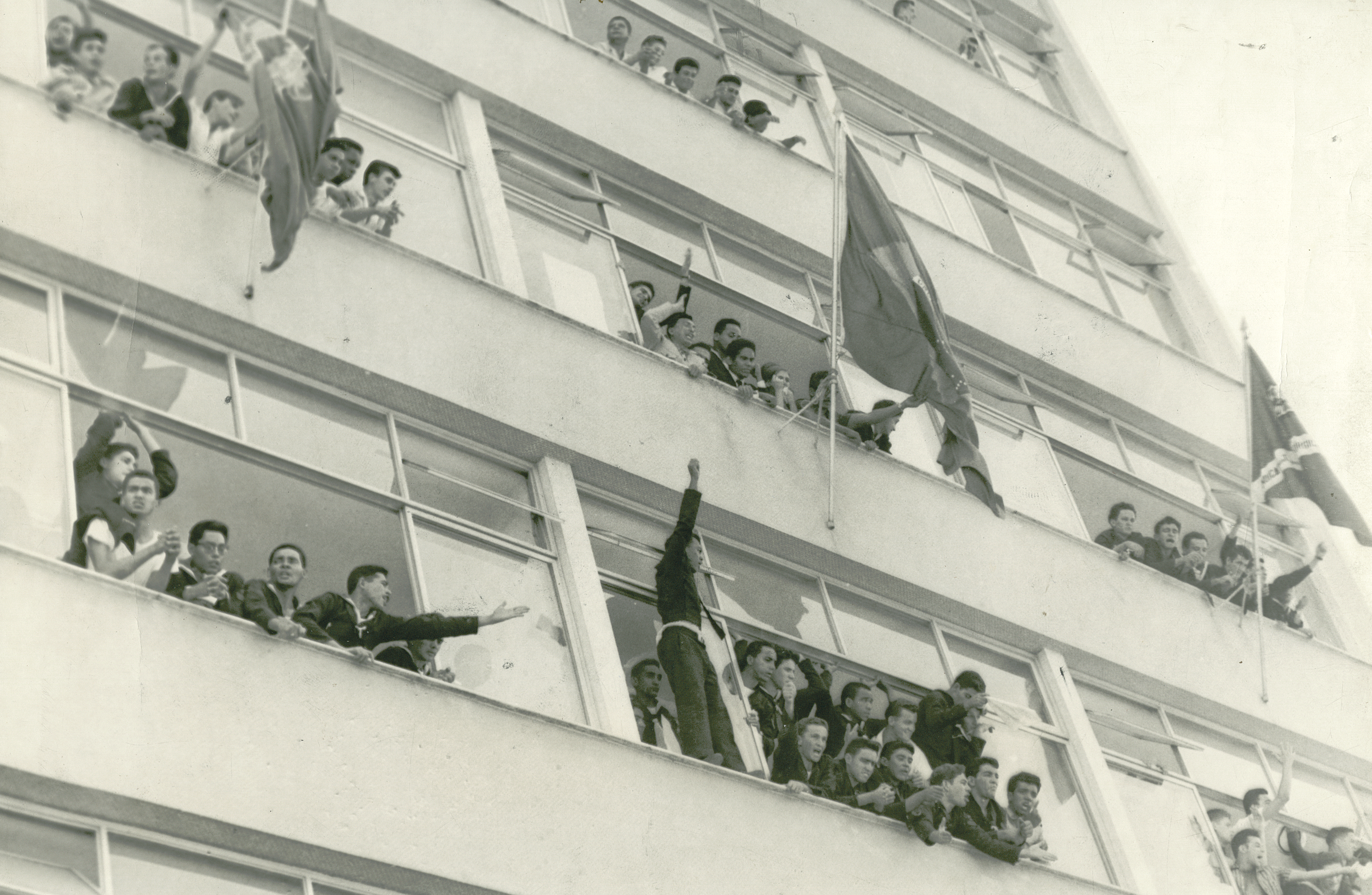
Sailors address the Marines outside

The anniversary began in a festive mood, but turned into an uproar with the news of the arrests. Those present decided, in solidarity, to report to the brig on Monday the 30th. But the sailor Octacílio dos Anjos Santos ("Tatá") took the floor and suggested that they remain there, remembering that many lived on board. Corporal Cláudio Ribeiro raised the tone, proposing that the commemoration should become a permanent assembly to obtain recognition of the Association by the Navy. These two speeches were exalted and of great importance.

The Minister of the Navy heard at 02:30 in the morning, as early as the 26th, the sailors' idea to report arrested on Monday. His response was to decree strict readiness. In this way, the sailors were obliged to report to their military organizations, or they would be committing insubordination. At dawn Admiral Aragão went to the Union to personally transmit this order. He returned with the sailors' conditions - the recognition of the AMFNB and the cancellation of the punishments. The minister did not accept and prepared a military response. The sailors, for their part, would remain on watch as long as their demands were not met. Thus, the conflict was drawn. The sailors did not use weapons to make their demands.

In a note, the AMFNB defined the situation as "an epic that will culminate in reforms of our archaic regulations," while for the Navy, a "minority of the military, about 600 men, between sailors and marines, have been since last night in an attitude of frank indiscipline." The communiqué from the naval authorities also stated that the Navy Minister supported President Goulart's reforms and that the improvement of the sailors' conditions was already underway.

A Navy helicopter and a yellow plane flew over the Union. Curious family members and girlfriends brought supplies and cigarettes. The emotion inside was one of distress, with the sailors feeling defensive. Statements by Anselmo and Antônio Duarte also describe a loss of control; Duarte points, in particular, to "Tatá's" speech as destabilizing. On the other hand, in making its demands, the movement was not on the defensive.

The left in general came out in favor of the sailors, even with internal objections that the infraction of discipline was serious and would serve as a pretext for a right-wing coup. Sympathy for the cause of the rebels was strong. For the UNE, "only the reaction feels threatened by the sailors' movement". For the Communist Party newspaper Novos Rumos, only "the enemies of the homeland, the gorillas with or without a uniform" were against the sailors. Panfleto, linked to Leonel Brizola, announced: "The feudal regime in the Navy will end". The CGT threatened a general strike if the sailors were repressed and assumed an arbitrator role.

=== Legalistic Offensives ===
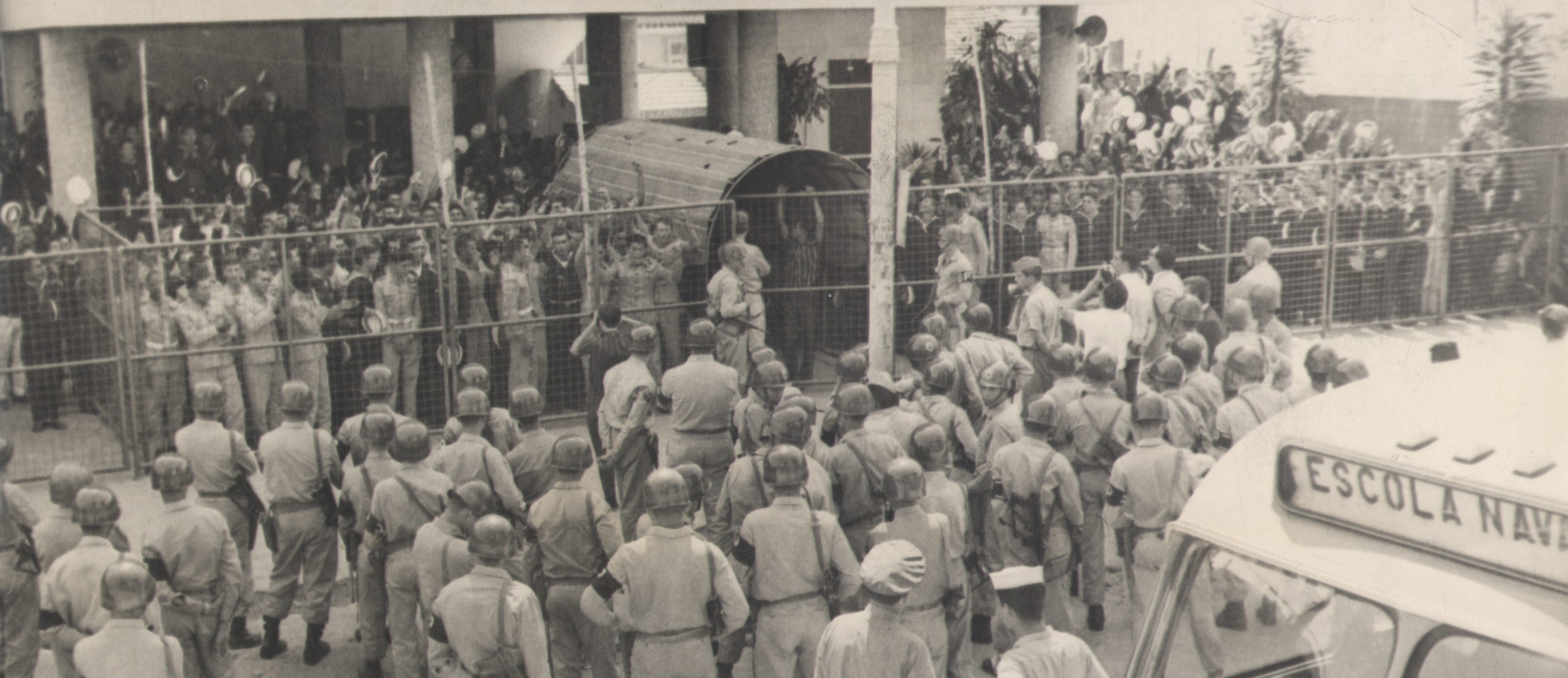
Marines face the sailors

Admiral Aragão was ordered to attack the sailors, but he refused and resigned. His subcommander, Admiral Washington Frazão Braga, did the same. Only Admiral Luiz Phelippe Sinay agreed to command the operation. He commanded the Marine Division Core.

The officialdom demanded that the sailors leave, "dead or alive." The Marine Corps Police Company, deployed from Ilha das Cobras, was in charge of the invasion, scheduled for 09:15. (Note: Correio da Manhã places the event after 11:05 a.m.) 90 marines came in five buses. From inside the Union, the sailors incited the marines and sang the National Anthem. Private Raimundo Nonato Barbosa, disobeying his orders, abandoned his helmet, ammunition, and INA machine gun and joined the sailors. 25 of his comrades repeated the gesture, to the euphoria of the sailors and the amazement of the commanders. The rest of the company had to retreat.

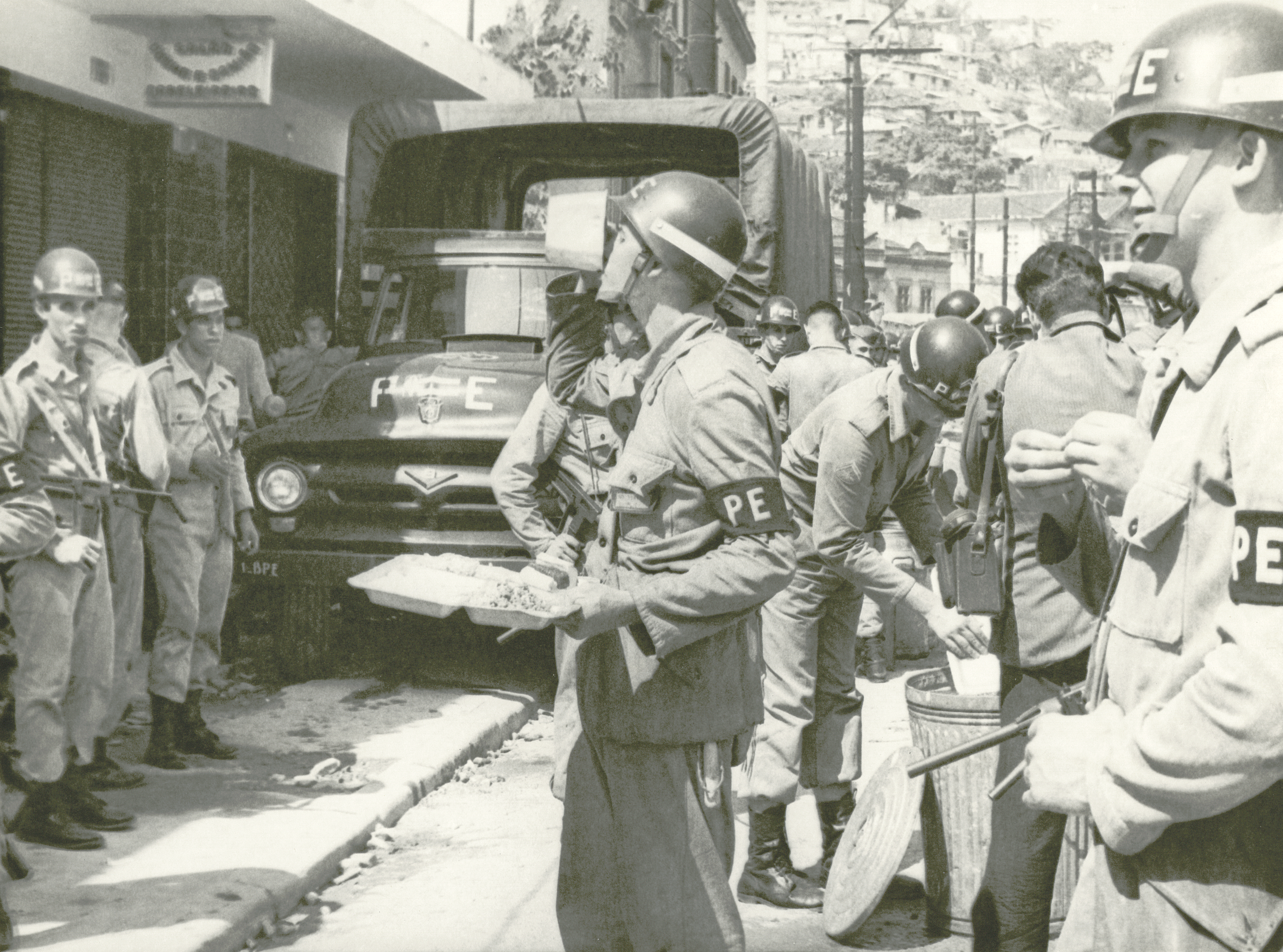
Army Police

At the Navy Ministry, indignant admirals demanded that Minister Mota assert his authority. A new invasion was planned, this time with the Riachuelo Battalion, based on Ilha do Governador. Commanded by Frigate captain Helio Migueles Leão, it arrived at 4:00 pm. A platoon received tear gas. However, at 6:00 pm Admiral Sinay received the order to withdraw the troops: nothing would be done without the order of the president, who was returning from São Borja. Negotiations remained, and continued throughout the day.

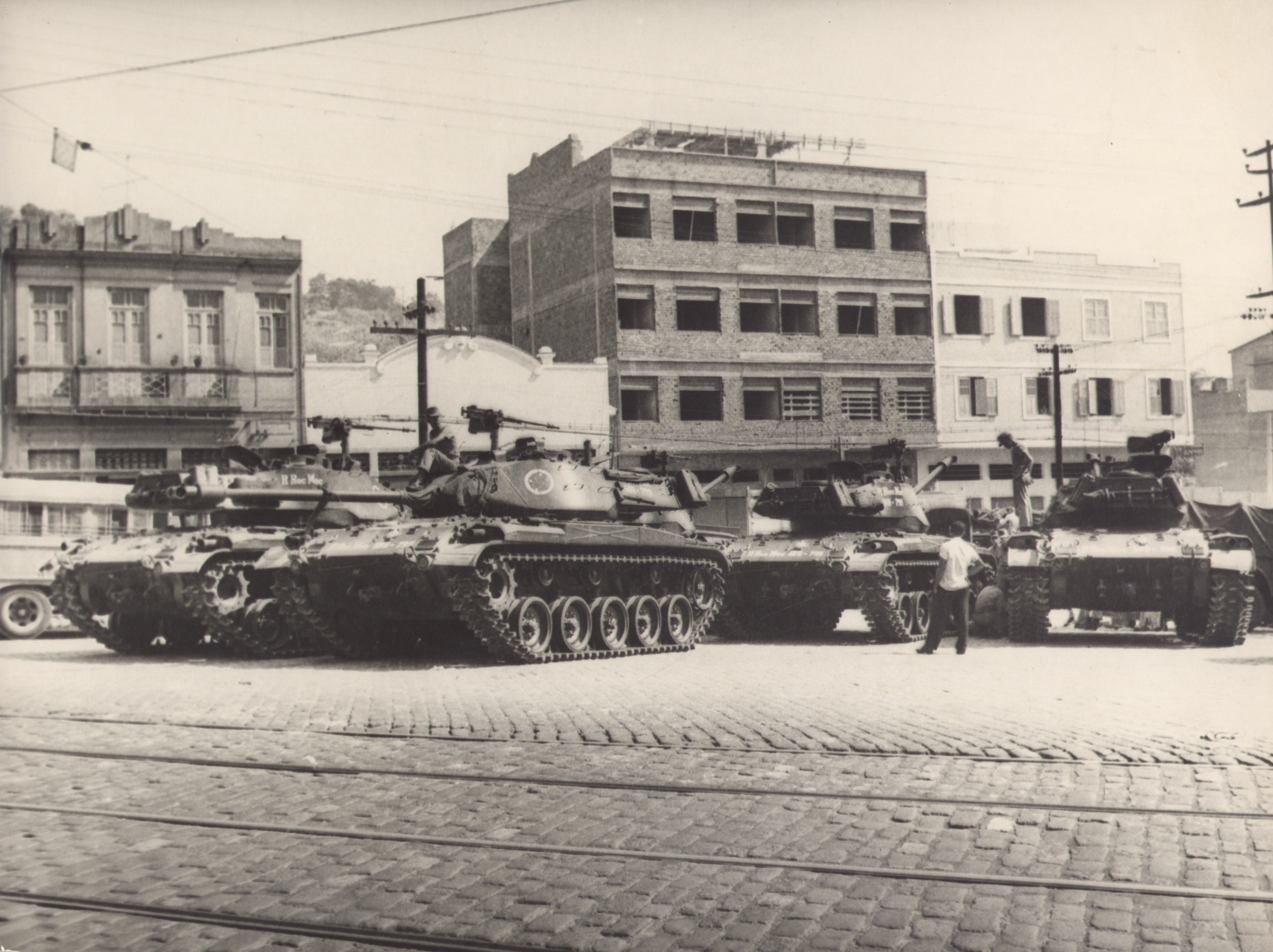
Tanks at Largo do Pedregulho

The Army had a marginal participation in the containment of the insubordinates. The disciplinary situation in the Land Force was better, and its soldiers did not join the revolt. The support was requested by the Navy Minister to the Ministry of War and included twelve tanks and 500 soldiers of the Mechanized Reconnaissance Regiment and the 1st Army Police Battalion, (Note: See Structure of the Brazilian Army in 1960#I Army (Rio de Janeiro, GB) for the location of both.) the latter with the field presence of Colonel Domingos Ventura. Participation was requested for both offensives, and by the afternoon the entire block was closed by the Army. However, the official position of the War Ministry was that the problem "at present, is restricted to the purview of the Navy Ministry."

=== Spreading to ships ===
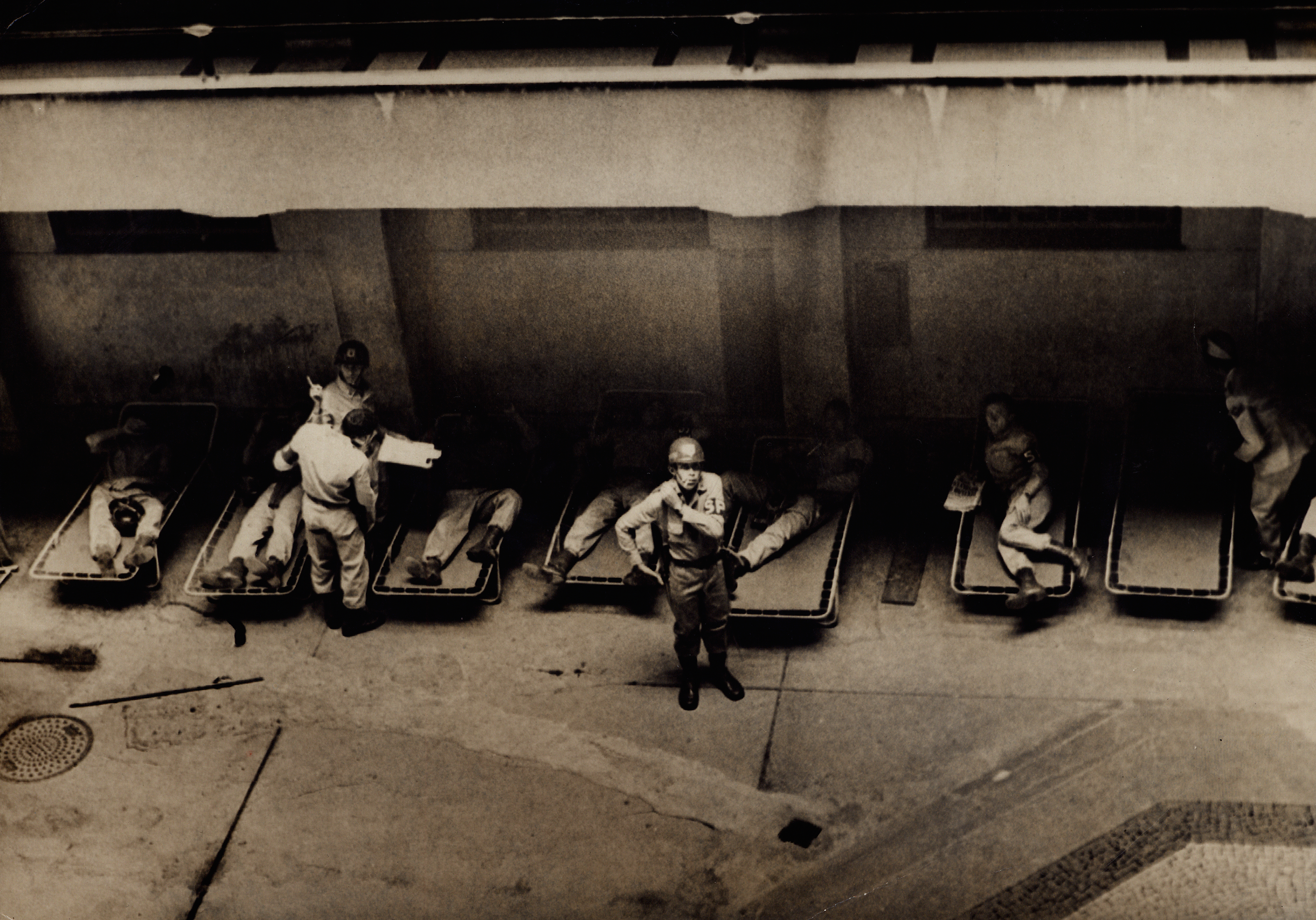
Marines at Navy Ministry

On the morning of the 27th, a large group of sailors (Note: About 80 (Ferreira & Gomes 2014), 100 (Dulles 2014), 200 (Almeida 2010) or 300 (Rodrigues 2017).) left their boats and went through the Navy Arsenal to join the others in the Union. On the way, they fell into an ambush: officers and marines posted in the buildings, among them that of the Navy Ministry, opened fire, under the command of Admiral Arnoldo Hasselmann Fairbairn. Captain of Frigate Rafael de Azevedo Branco advanced against them. Some fell in the water, others reacted (Note: Dulles 2014 records that the sailors fought back with their own gunfire, which is not mentioned in Almeida 2010 and Rodrigues 2017.) and most of them retreated to their ships. Of those who swam, two made it to the Union. The balance was eight arrests, one dead (according to Jornal do Brasil) (Note: Jornal do Brasil, 28 de março de 1964. Almeida 2010 does not include one dead person in its total balance, and states about this death, on p. 75, that "the information has never been verified.") and several people wounded, (Note: Almeida 2010 says that it was 3 wounded, and Dulles 2014, four.) treated, then, at the Navy hospital. Conflicts between sailors in favor of the revolt and officers opposed to it spread throughout the ships. There was insubordination, sabotage of ship components, shooting, and falling into the water. This was recorded on the cruiser Tamandaré, the destroyer Pernambuco, the ship José Bonifácio and the ocean-going vessel Bauru. Sailors from the aircraft carrier Minas Gerais participated in the events at the Navy Arsenal. However, despite the tension, the officers believed that most of the ships were under their control.

In counterpoint to the sailors' movement, a movement of officers arose. Gathered at the Naval Club, they refused to board ships until there was a sufficient response to the sailors. They also demanded the punishment of Admiral Aragão.

=== Ministerial change and amnesty ===
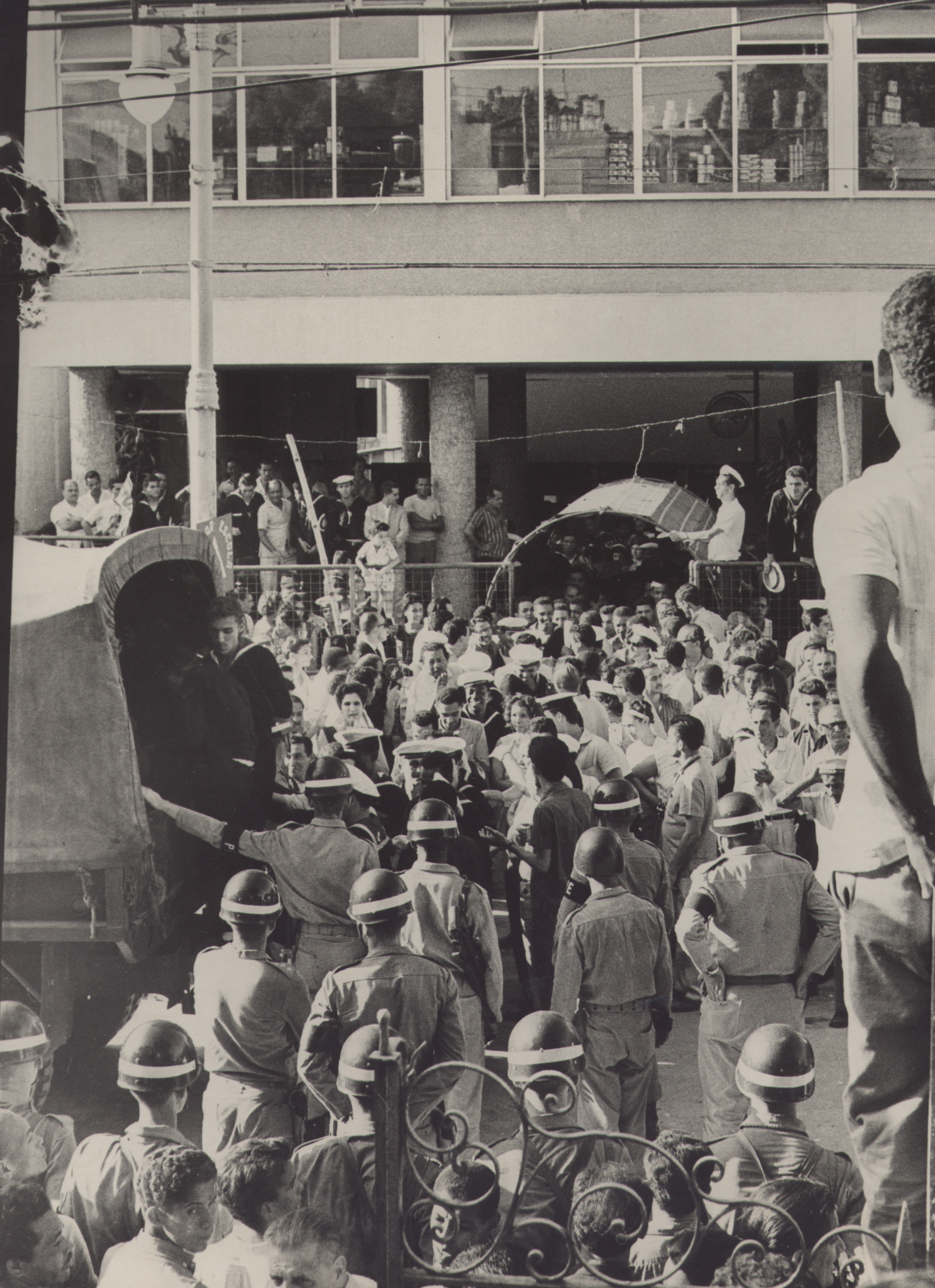
The sailors' departure

The president landed in Rio de Janeiro at 1:00 am on the 27th. Half an hour later, he met at the Palácio Laranjeiras with the heads of the Civil and Military Houses and the military ministers. General Genaro Bontempo was replacing War Minister Jair Dantas Ribeiro, who was hospitalized. The subject was the Navy Minister's request for exoneration. The Admiralty Council did not want to accept this resignation, but Goulart confirmed it. By this time the AMFNB had already expressed its demand that a new Minister of the Navy be appointed.

Sílvio Mota's successor was Admiral Paulo Mário da Cunha Rodrigues, "president of the Maritime Court, a man of the left and trusted by the CGT". Jornal do Brasil reported that his name "was chosen from a triple list presented by the Executive Committee of the CGT," which was acting with permission granted by the AMFNB. Hércules Côrrea, of the CGT, confirms that the name was presented by his organization. Dante Pelacani, CGT emissary inside the Union, reports that Paulo Mário's name came from the sailors. The two other names on the list were Admirals Suzano and José Luiz de Araújo Goyano. After taking over, Paulo Mário nominated Suzano to the Navy General Staff and restored Admiral Aragão's command in the Marine Corps. As negotiations continued, on the 27th, the Army's Floriano Regiment, (Note: That is, the 1st 105-mm shell regiment.) kept the Metalworkers Union surrounded.

Goulart wanted a negotiated outcome. His interlocutors were Darcy Ribeiro, Armando de Moraes Ancora, commander of the First Army, and the ministers Abelardo Jurema, of Justice, Amaury Silva, of Labor, and Anísio Botelho, of Aeronautics. The CGT represented the sailors to the president. The solution was to drive the sailors to Army installations, where they would be free of retaliation from the Navy officers, and their amnesty. The CGT emissaries managed to convince most of the sailors, although "Corporal Anselmo" was still reticent.

The origin of amnesty is a controversy. Historiography accepts that it came from Goulart. In the Navy document "Aspectos dos Acontecimentos Político-Militares de 25 de Março a 1º de Abril de 1964", without authorship, it is stated, however, that the decision was made by the minister Paulo Mário, with carte blanche from the president, who until then had a commitment with the previous minister to punish the insurgents. This version is also corroborated in testimony from the minister himself, according to whom he obtained permission for the amnesty after arguing that the admirals also had to be punished. According to Hugo de Faria, Goulart was actually thinking about amnesty, reasoning that it had been granted to officers involved in rebellions since 1922 and it would be unfair not to apply it to the enlisted men as well.

The sailors were taken from the Union in Army trucks and detained at the Guards Battalion, in São Cristóvão, for three hours. As of 5:30 pm they were released. On the way back, some stopped at the Candelária Church. It was Good Friday, and they prayed for those affected at the Navy Arsenal. As they were heading toward the Ministry of the Navy, Minister Paulo Mário sent Admirals Aragão and Suzano to advise the sailors not to continue. However, they were lifted by the shoulders and carried amidst the euphoria. They passed the Ministry of War, startling the Army officers who silently watched the march.

== Consequences ==
=== Political repercussions ===
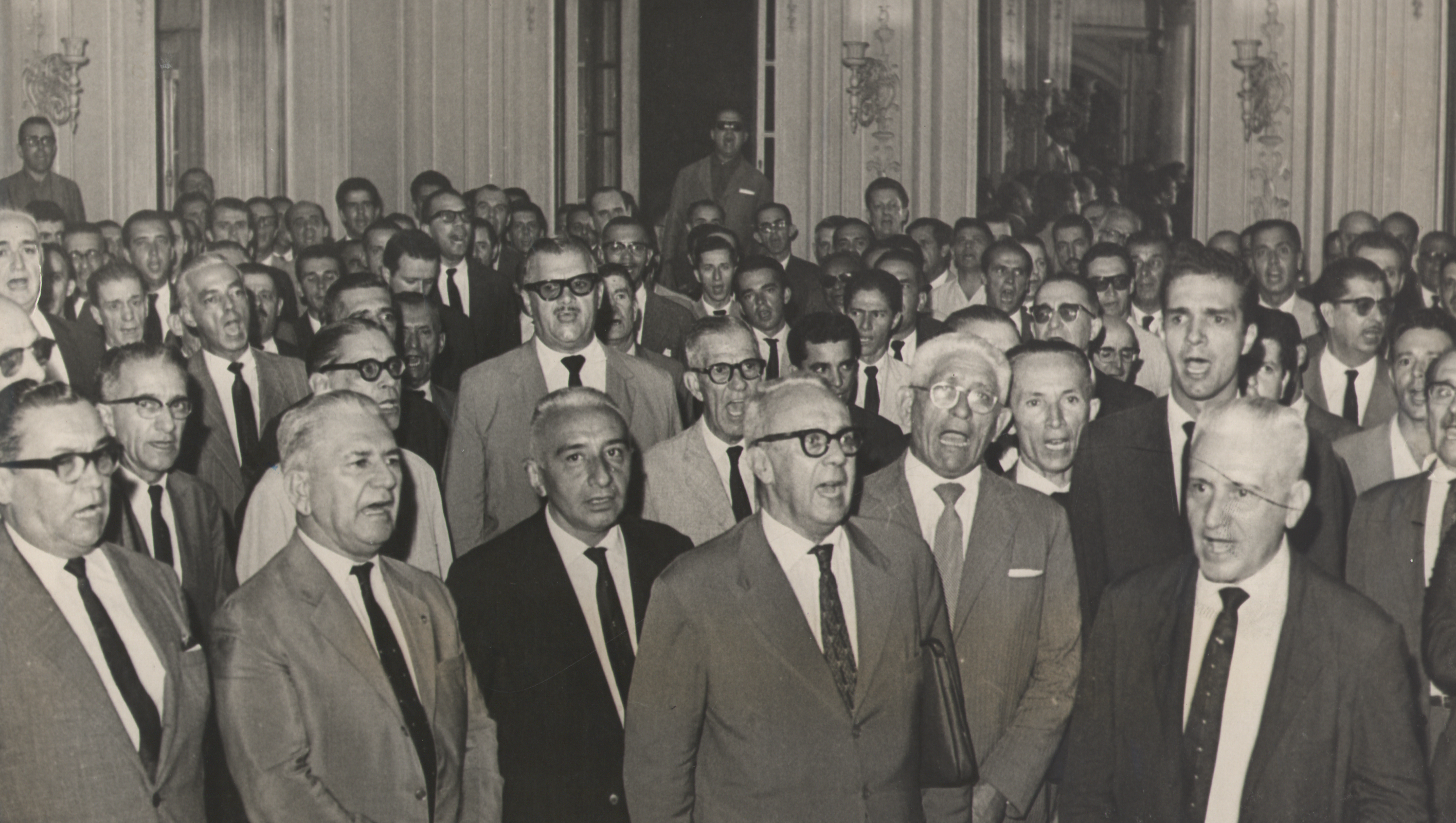
Publication of the manifest at the Naval Club

The sailors imagined themselves victorious and already saw on the horizon the granting of their demands. For the lefts in general, there could be the appearance of victory. For President Goulart, the result would prove negative, as the focus of political debate shifted from the reforms he advocated to military discipline, and his response to the revolt was considered tolerant of indiscipline. Among the newspapers, Ultima Hora treated the solution as the restoration of order, but Tribuna da Imprensa and Correio da Manhã criticized the president for not enforcing the principle of authority and denounced the disintegration caused by indiscipline. The press in general pointed to Goulart as responsible for the breakdown of hierarchy and discipline. The repercussion was international: in France, La Croix, Le Figaro, and France-Soir saw the revolt as a serious event. Goulart did not back down and attended a meeting of the enlisted men at the Automóvel Clube, in the presence of the unionists and sailors who participated in the revolt.

Detail by detail, the outcome offended the officers and especially humiliated those in the Navy: the choice of a new minister under the influence of the unionists, the detention of the sailors in Army, not Navy, facilities, and the provocative march with the admirals on their shoulders. Amnesty was more offensive than the "Corporal Anselmo" speech itself. The sergeants' revolt of the previous year, although serious, did not have such repercussions, because those responsible were punished. The Navy officers, after watching it unfold in silence, published a manifesto at the Naval Club on the 29th. The document characterizes the "mutinied sailors" as an "insignificant minority"; however, they did not receive the "due disciplinary punishment" and on top of that were able to overthrow the Minister of the Navy and appoint his replacement. This was a "blow struck against discipline in the Navy" and a threat to the country's institutions as a whole. Finally, the officers declared themselves willing to "resist by all means in our power the attempts to communize the country." The next day, the Army officers at the Military Club expressed solidarity with the Navy.

According to the columnist Carlos Castelo Branco, the left-wingers already compared what happened to "an action of the Kronstadt sailors in support of the Petrograd Soviet line", that is, to the Russian Revolution of 1917. Ênio Silveira remembers that, during the revolt, the climate among the left was exalted; some "already saw the Odessa stairs, from Eisenstein's film", events of the Russian Revolution of 1905. Tribuna da Imprensa also saw parallels with Russian history, as well as anti-communists in general; with exalted spirits, they had an exaggerated view that this could be the "harbinger of the Bolshevik revolution".

=== Relation with the coup d'état ===
In the Navy, tension continued after the amnesty. Some officers did not allow the sailors to board their ships. For the government, the conservative officers in the naval force were demoralized and would not be a threat. Until the 31st, the AMFNB kept the officers cornered. They even controlled the armament, prevented the ships from leaving, and maintained contact with the legalist officers. An extreme group of admirals plotted the capture of the Navy Ministry, but was repulsed by the conspiratorial generals, for whom the Navy officers did not control their ships and could do nothing but publish manifestos. Instead, they were waiting for General Olímpio Mourão Filho's offensive from Minas Gerais.

The precipitation of the conspiracy against the president became a question of time, and in a few days it emerged in a coup d'état. Its perpetrators unanimously pointed, in statements, to the disintegration of the Armed Forces, with the breakdown of hierarchy and discipline, as its motivation. The bulletin of the 4th Infantry Division of March 31 points to the revolt as the reason for its offensive against the government. Records of officers of the Military Police of Minas Gerais, a participant in this operation, have the same condemnation of the events in Guanabara. The legalist military, even those favorable to the president's causes, shared this concern, which diminished their willingness to fight the coup. The president felt supported by his military apparatus, and the conquest of the legalists' camp was fundamental to the conspirators' victory: according to them, if Goulart had shown toughness with indiscipline, the correlation of forces would have been favorable to his permanence in power. The military unit was momentarily strengthened, which allowed the coup to take place.

Avelino Capitani, one of the directors who was in prison during the revolt, interprets it as not an antecedent to the coup, but an anticipated response, because the Association was already observing what the coup plotters were doing.

During the coup, AMFNB members were willing to fight on behalf of the government under Admiral Aragão. Some occupied the headquarters of pro-coup newspapers on his orders. Anselmo and the other directors also acted on their own initiative, collecting weapons and planning their military action together with UNE students, unionists, the Peasant Leagues and others. These efforts did not alter the course of the coup, nor did they prevent its success.

=== Fate of those involved ===
Soon after the coup, the new regime began a political "cleansing", and the participants of the revolt, as the center of attention of the previous days, were its first targets. For the dictatorship this set an example to the dissidents, and for the Navy, it was a question of prestige. The Naval Force, due to the great politicization of its bases, was the corporation in which the "cleaning" process was strongest. On April 2, CENIMAR officers began the retaliation. Augusto Rademaker, the new Minister of the Navy, expelled the members of the AMFNB, and on November 23 it was dissolved. The Military Police Inquiry to investigate the events at the Metalworkers Union had 1,123 people indicted. The arrests and political persecution were done through the ordinary disciplinary legislation, not the Institutional Acts, as occurred with the officers. About 1,200 sailors were expelled, of whom about 300 were, after a two-year trial, sentenced by the Military Justice to two to fifteen years in prison.

Some of the insurgents joined revolutionary organizations and participated in their armed struggle. Among them, Anselmo worked as a double agent, allowing the execution of other militants in the early 1970s. With his betrayal, he became the target of the militants' frustration and hatred.

In the 1970s, when amnesty was under debate, the regime's hardliners wanted to limit its scope, including for enlisted men. The 1979 Amnesty Law was initially interpreted by the Supreme Court as not applicable to military personnel punished under common law, thus excluding sailors. The former insurgents got amnesty in legal disputes over years.

During the dictatorship, the Navy tried to avoid a new crisis by raising pay and improving the living conditions of its enlisted men. The demands of the sailors were eventually met. In the 21st century, conditions for non-commissioned officers are better and the institution is more open. Corporals, sailors and soldiers can marry and vote, although the Military Regulations still prevent them from running for office. The 1983 Disciplinary Regulations are little different from those of 1955.

== Historiography ==
In the memory of the military, the revolt is remembered as the desecration of their values by the president, emphasizing the "disorder and indiscipline", the weakness of the government and the link to the communists. Journalist Elio Gaspari and historian Thomas Skidmore are close to this understanding. Some authors address only indiscipline, but Skidmore also describes the social demands of the sailors. Among the left, there are retrospective views that the revolt was a mistake, a provocation, and an attack on discipline. There is, on the left, an interpretation of the revolt, and especially Anselmo's, as a destabilization of the Goulart government, paying little attention to the AMFNB. Its exponents are Edgard Carone, Moniz Bandeira, Marcos Aurélio Borba, Edmar Morel, Hélio Silva, Boris Fausto and Dênis de Moraes. Another version, represented by political scientists Caio Navarro de Toledo and Alfred Stepan and historians Jacob Gorender and Nelson Werneck Sodré, treats the revolt carefully, distinguishes Anselmo from the AMFNB and writes little about the Association.

=== Accusations about agents provocateurs ===
The interpretation of the revolt as a destabilization blames Anselmo and puts credit on the testimony of naval officer Ivo Acioly Corseuil, head of the Federal Service of Information and Counterintelligence (SFICI) in the Goulart government. In a statement to Moniz Bandeira, published in 1977 in the book O governo João Goulart: as lutas sociais no Brasil (1961-1964), he stated that Anselmo was an agent of the Central Intelligence Agency (CIA) infiltrated into the sailors' movement to create a pretext for a right-wing coup. The book adds that the work as a double agent during the dictatorship is evidence of work before the coup, and the CIA was linked to the CENIMAR and the Military Police of opposition governor Carlos Lacerda, who infiltrated agents, in sailor's uniform, to carry out mayhem. Anselmo is also cited as an undercover agent for the Navy.

In this line of reasoning, "History has already proven that there were undercover agents among the sailors", and thus, "The movement of the Association of Sailors and Marines of Brazil was, subsequently, quite discredited and seen as a 'black page' in the history of Brazil, according to the immediate memory of the events." This version prevails at the beginning of the 21st century.

However, for a "new batch of studies", the movement of the military subalterns was "misrepresented", "biasedly interpreted as being plotted by the CIA, without further investigation". According to authors contrary to this interpretation, there is no proof for Corseuil's accusations and this version disregards the activities of Anselmo, the other sailors, and the left; it uses the sailors, especially Anselmo, as a scapegoat for the coup; segregates them from the left and society; treats the revolt as the result of external interference, does not consider the movement's demands and reproduces the officers' contempt for their subordinates' capacity for autonomous action. Another source, without taking sides, points out that Anselmo's speech had repercussions because it was in line with what the sailors and leftist militants wanted. Corporal and "sailor-journalist" (Note: Read Rodrigues 2017, p. 14 e 102.) Pedro Viegas contests that Anselmo was an undercover agent. He notes how Anselmo was not the strongest name for the AMFNB presidency, and was only elected due to the withdrawal of three other more preferred candidates.

=== Name ===
There is confusion as to the designation of the episode. The military use the terms revolt, rebellion, revolution, mutiny, strike, and assembly. Other titles are mayhem, uprising, insurrection and revolt. Historians and participating sailors prefer revolt. A 2010 dissertation discusses the names rebellion, revolt, and mutiny, preferring rebellion for what occurred in the Metalworkers Union, and mutiny, for on the ships. The latter two were in military legislation, mutiny as a form of disobedience and revolt, involving weapons. (Note: Discussed at Almeida 2010, pp. 17–21, and cited in Rodrigues 2017, pp. 32–33.)
