= Cabo Anselmo =

Brazilian military officer (1942–2022)

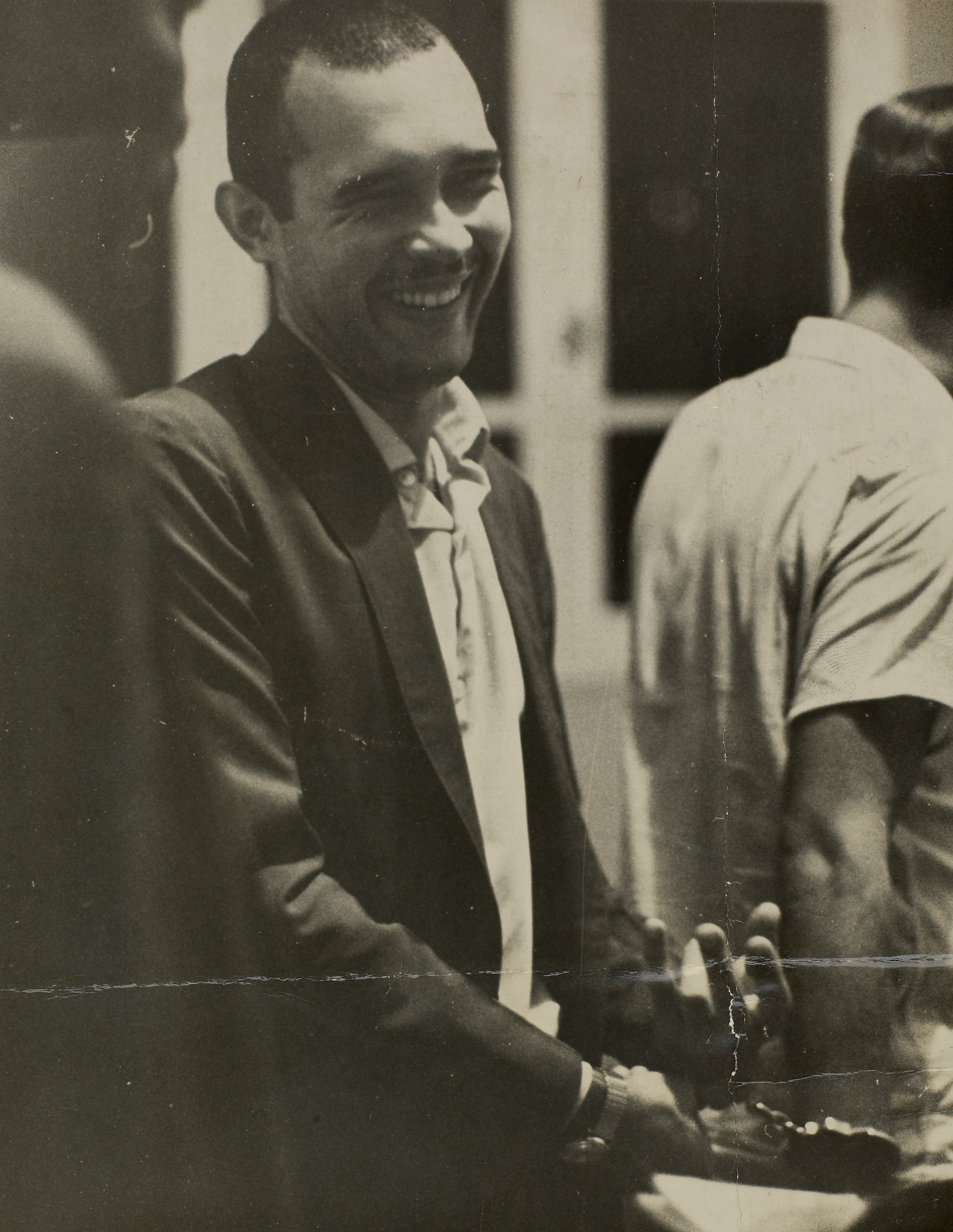
- Anselmo in 1964
- Born: José Anselmo dos Santos; 13 February 1942; Itaporanga d'Ajuda, Brazil
- Died: 15 March 2022 (aged 80); Jundiaí, Brazil
- Military career
- Allegiance: Brazil
- Service / branch: Brazilian Navy

José Anselmo dos Santos (13 February 1942 – 15 March 2022), known as Cabo Anselmo ("Corporal Anselmo"), was a Brazilian military officer who was the leader of the Sailors' Revolt, which started the 1964 Brazilian coup d'état. Initially presenting himself in public as a military officer identified with Marxist ideas, he was in reality an undercover agent of the forces of repression of the military government, where he collected and provided the military with information that allowed them to capture guerrillas and leftist opponents, including his partner, Soledad Barrett Viedma, who, while pregnant, was brutally tortured and died in a military prison.

== Overview ==
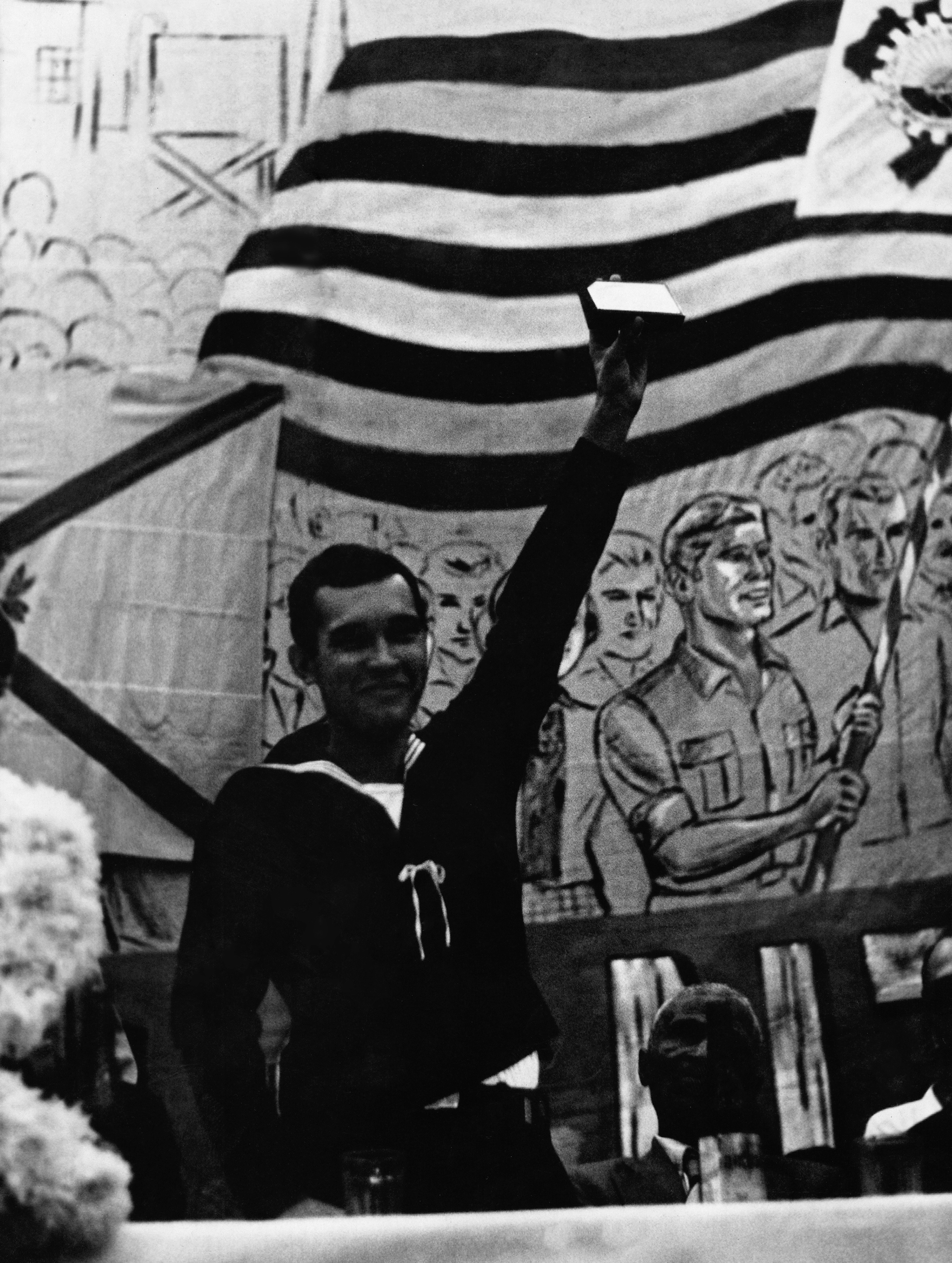
Cabo Anselmo during the Sailors' Revolt

He joined the Brazilian Armed Forces in 1958 and four years later he joined the Association of Sailors and Naval Riflemen of Brazil, where he became president. His figure became known in 1964 when he led a movement of sailors who fought for union demands, trying to give the false impression of being a military officer identified with Marxist ideas. After the 1964 Brazilian coup d'état, Anselmo was tried and expelled from the Brazilian Navy, but later managed to go into exile in Cuba.

He returned to Brazil in 1970 as an infiltrator of the intelligence services and became an active member of the Vanguarda Popular Revolucionária (VPR, "Revolutionary People's Vanguard"), organization opposed to the dictatorship, in which he became responsible for the surrender and death of his own leftist comrades, as reflected in the episode that occurred on January 8, 1973, known as the Chacra de São Bento massacre. There, in the metropolitan region of Recife, six members of a VPR cell were tortured and murdered, among them Soledad Barrett Viedma, his young partner who, two days earlier, had turned 28 and was five months pregnant. Paraguayan and granddaughter of the Spanish anarchist writer Rafael Barrett, her case became famous when Mario Benedetti dedicated a poem to her and Daniel Viglietti a song.

Protected by the armed forces and the CIA, he lived in hiding since the 1970s and only had a couple of public appearances in which he confirmed his denunciations. The first happened on March 28, 1984, when he gave an interview to the magazine Istoé, in which he tells how he had gone from the armed struggle to collaborating with the repressive apparatus of the Brazilian dictatorship. For fifteen years he was not heard from again, until in 1999, another magazine, Época, did a new report on him in which he confirmed that he was the main person responsible for the dismantling of the Vanguarda Popular Revolucionária.

Anselmo died at the age of 80, in a hospital in Jundiaí, due to a kidney infection.
