= Casa Militar (Brazil) =

The Casa Militar is an institution in Brazil designed primarily to protect the high interests of the state, the government and its people. Its duties, covering the safety of the highest authority of the state, the seat of government and ajudância-of-order of the president or governor.
