= Brazilian Army Non-Commissioned Officer Academy =

- Escola de Sargentos das Armas
- Unit Insignia Brazilian Army Non-Commissioned Officer Academy
- Active: 28 May 1894; 131 years ago
- Country: Brazil
- Branch: Army
- Type: NCO Academy
- Garrison/HQ: Três Corações, MG; 21.70283°S 45.25708°W
- Nickname: ESA
- Patron: Sargento Max Wolff Filho
- Mottos: Sergeant: a fundamental link between Command and Troop.
- Mascot: Crested caracara
- Website: https://www.esa.eb.mil.br

Commanders
- Comandante: General de Brigada Reinaldo SALGADO Beato
- Subcomandante: Coronel Roberto Wanderley GUARINO Junior

The Brazilian Army Combatant NCO Academy (Portuguese: Escola de Sargentos das Armas, ESA) is a Higher Education Establishment of the Brazilian Army, responsible for training its combatant non-commissioned officers (NCO), in Infantry, Cavalry, Artillery, Engineers and Signal Corps.

To this end, it annually selects young people from all parts of Brazil, through public tendering, offering them military education aimed at improving their character and developing their physical capacity, and also providing solid military background to the future NCO's - a crucial link between the Command of Military Organizations and the troops.

== The Creation of the Brazilian Army Combatant NCO Academy ==
ESA was created on August 21, 1945, at the end of World War II, through Decree No. 7.888. It had its origins in the NCO Infantry Academy - ESI, and offered training courses for future Infantry Cavalry, Artillery and Engineering NCO's. It initially occupied part of the facilities of the extinct Military School of Realengo, in Rio de Janeiro. The first class graduated in 1946. Four years later, it was transferred to Três Corações-MG. At that time, Infantry Lieutenant Colonel Miguel Lage Sayão was at the head of the academy, being its second Commandant.
